= Japanese art =

Japanese art

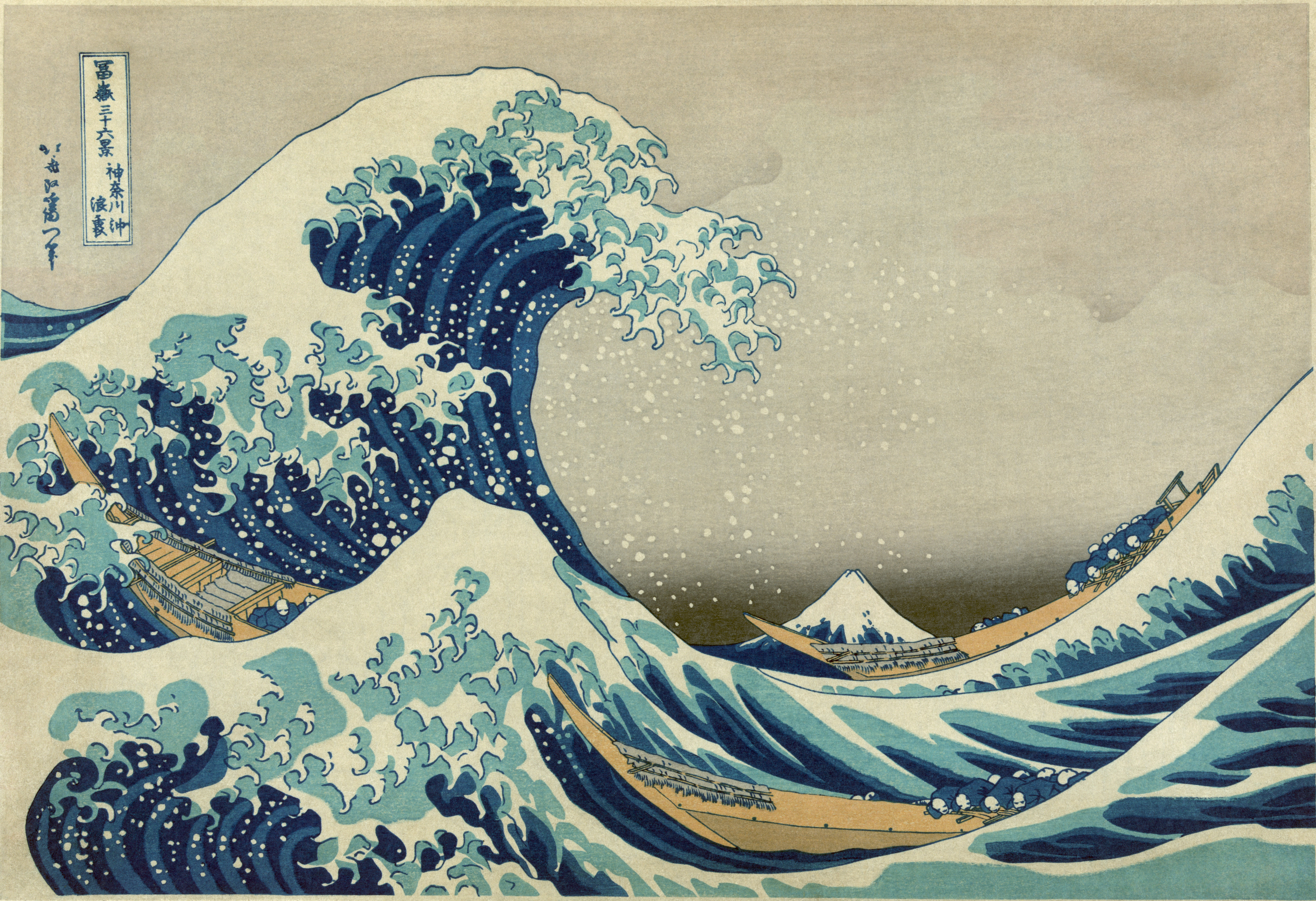
Woodblock print The Great Wave off Kanagawa by Katsushika Hokusai, Edo period

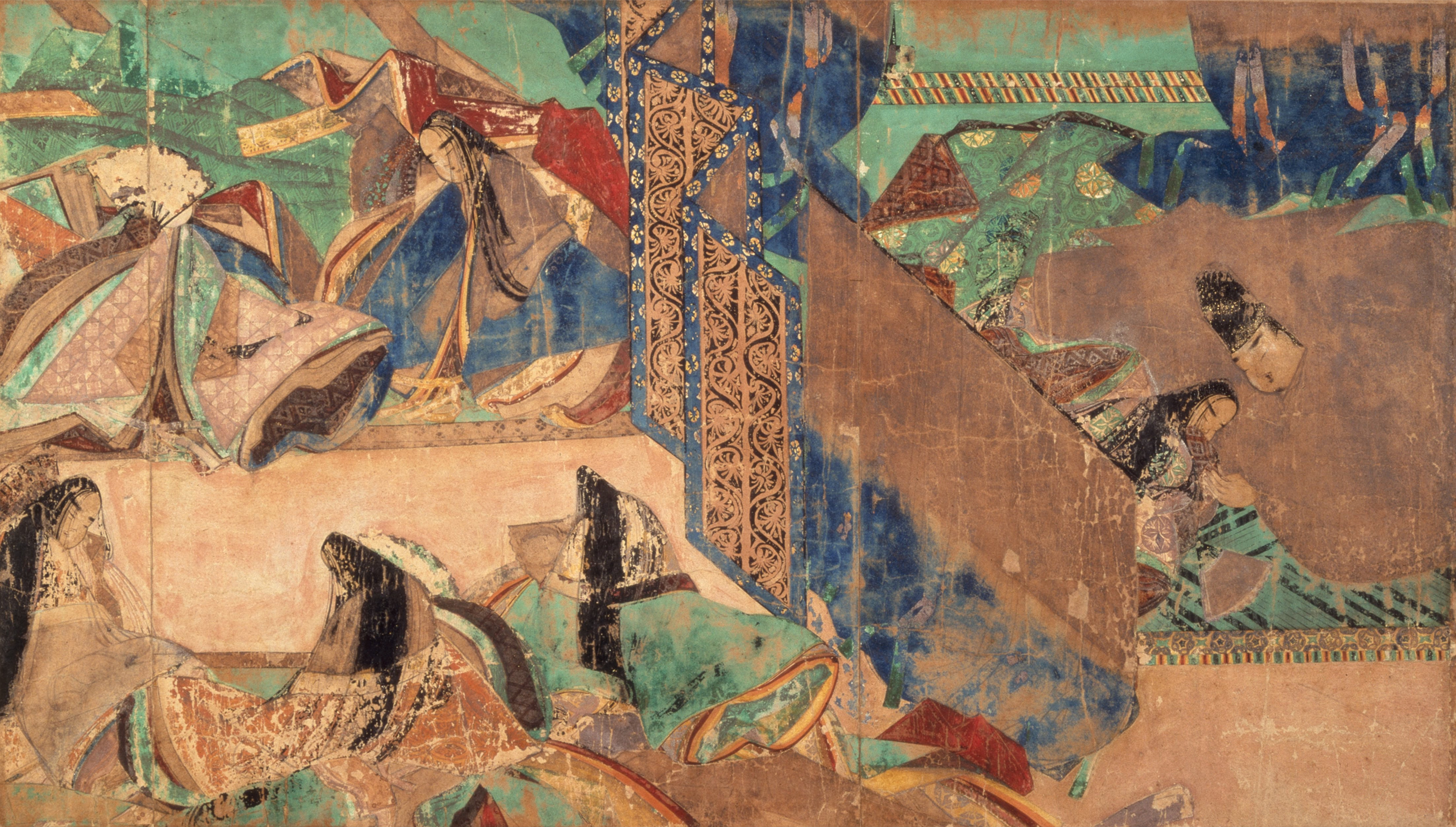
Scene from the Genji Monogatari Emaki, Heian period, early 12th century (National Treasure)

Japanese art consists of a wide range of art styles and media that includes ancient pottery, sculpture, ink painting and calligraphy on silk and paper, ukiyo-e paintings and woodblock prints, ceramics, origami, bonsai, and more recently manga and anime. It has a long history, ranging from the beginnings of human habitation in Japan, sometime in the 10th millennium BCE, to the present day.

Japan has alternated between periods of exposure to new ideas, and long periods of minimal contact with the outside world. Over time the country absorbed, imitated, and finally assimilated elements of foreign culture that complemented already-existing aesthetic preferences. The earliest complex art in Japan was produced in the 7th and 8th centuries in connection with Buddhism. In the 9th century, as the Japanese began to turn away from China and develop indigenous forms of expression, the secular arts became increasingly important; until the late 15th century, both religious and secular arts flourished. After the Ōnin War (1467–1477), Japan entered a period of political, social, and economic turmoil that lasted for over a century. In the state that emerged under the leadership of the Tokugawa shogunate, organized religion played a much less important role in people's lives, and the arts that survived were primarily secular. The Meiji Period (1868–1912) saw an abrupt influx of Western styles, which have continued to be an important influence.

Painting is the preferred artistic expression in Japan, practiced by amateurs and professionals alike. Until modern times, the Japanese wrote with a brush rather than a pen, and their familiarity with brush techniques has made them particularly sensitive to the values and aesthetics of painting. With the rise of popular culture in the Edo period, ukiyo-e, a style of woodblock prints, became a major form and its techniques were fine-tuned to create mass-produced, colorful pictures; in spite of painting's traditional pride of place, these prints proved to be instrumental in the Western world's 19th-century dialogue with Japanese art. The Japanese, in this period, found sculpture a much less sympathetic medium for artistic expression: most large Japanese sculpture is associated with religion, and the medium's use declined with the lessening importance of traditional Buddhism.

Japanese pottery is among the finest in the world and includes the earliest known Japanese artifacts; Japanese export porcelain has been a major industry at various points. Japanese lacquerware is also one of the world's leading arts and crafts, and works gorgeously decorated with maki-e were exported to Europe and China, remaining important exports until the 19th century. In architecture, Japanese preferences for natural materials and an interaction of interior and exterior space are clearly expressed.

== History ==
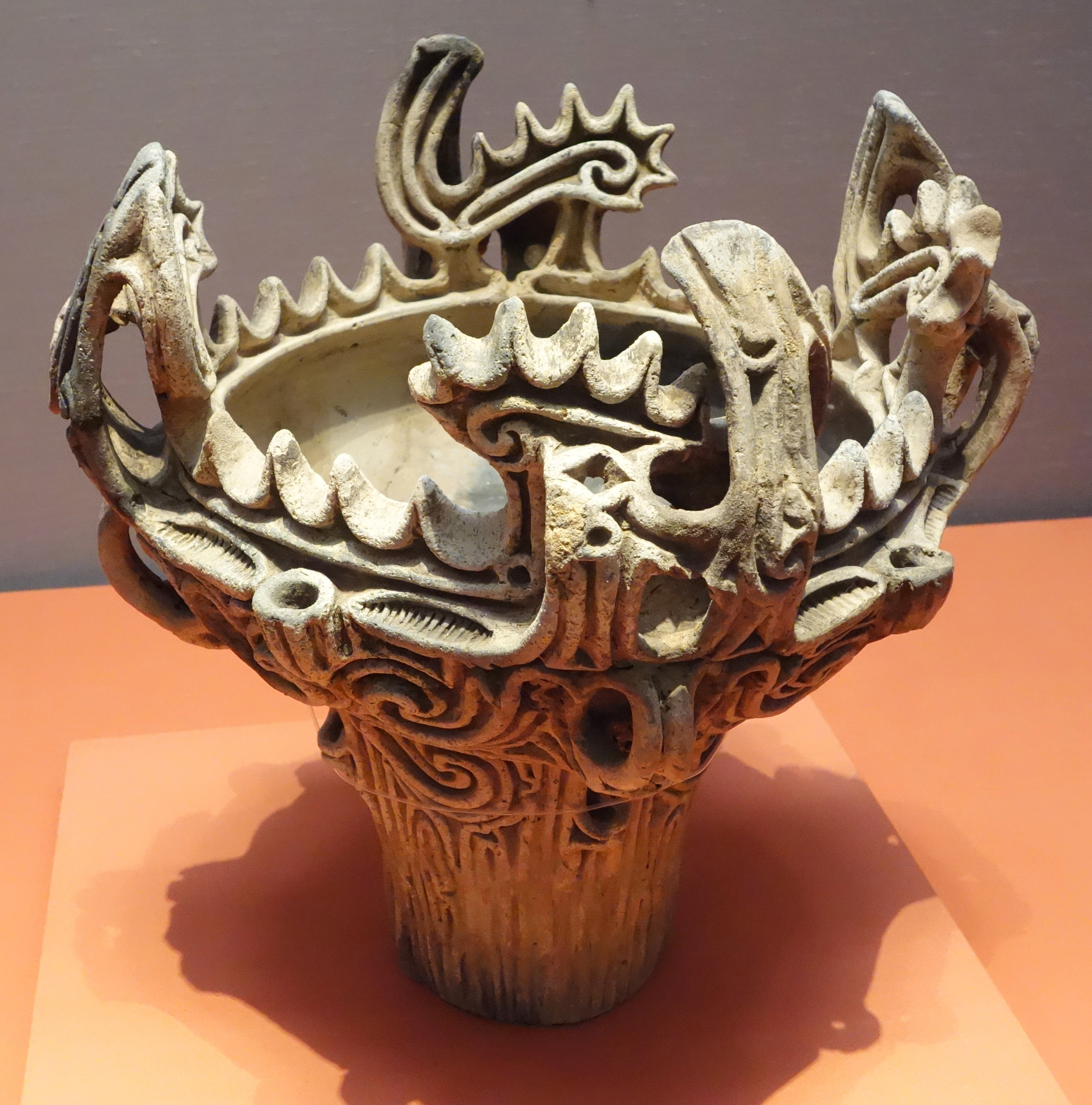
Middle Jōmon vase; circa 3000–2000 BCE

=== Jōmon art ===
The first settlers of Japan were the Jōmon people (c. 10,500 – c. 300 BCE), named for the cord markings that decorated the surfaces of their clay vessels. They were nomadic hunter-gatherers who later practiced organized farming and built cities with populations of hundreds if not thousands. They built simple houses of wood and thatch set into shallow earthen pits to provide warmth from the soil. They crafted lavishly decorated pottery storage vessels, clay figurines called dogū, and crystal jewels.

==== Early Jōmon period ====
During the Early Jōmon period (5000–2500 BCE), villages started to be discovered and ordinary everyday objects were found such as ceramic pots for boiling water. The pots found during this time had flat bottoms and elaborate designs made out of materials such as bamboo. It is believed that some early Jōmon figurines may have been used as fertility objects based on their breasts and broad hips.

==== Middle Jōmon period ====
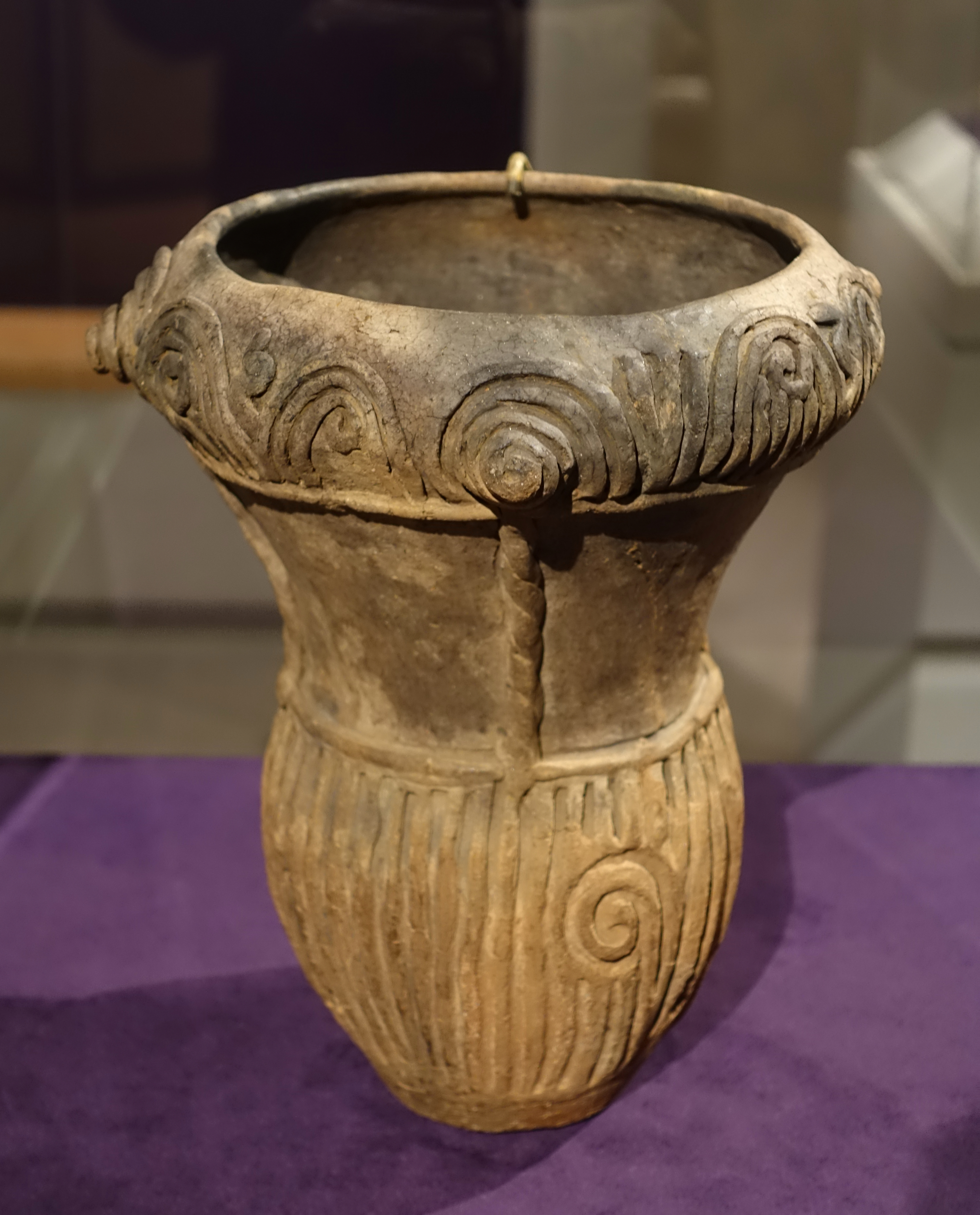
Jar; middle to late Jomon period; 35th–11th century BCE

The Middle Jōmon period (2500–1500 BCE), differed from the Early Jōmon Period in many ways. These people were less nomadic and began to settle in villages. They created useful tools to process the food they gathered and hunted, which made life easier. Through the numerous aesthetically pleasing ceramics found during this period, it is evident that they had a stable economy and more leisure time. In addition, the people of the Middle Jōmon period differed from their ancestors in their development of vessels for specific functions, for example, pots for storage. The decorations on these vessels were more realistic than those on early Jōmon ceramics.

==== Late and Final Jōmon period ====
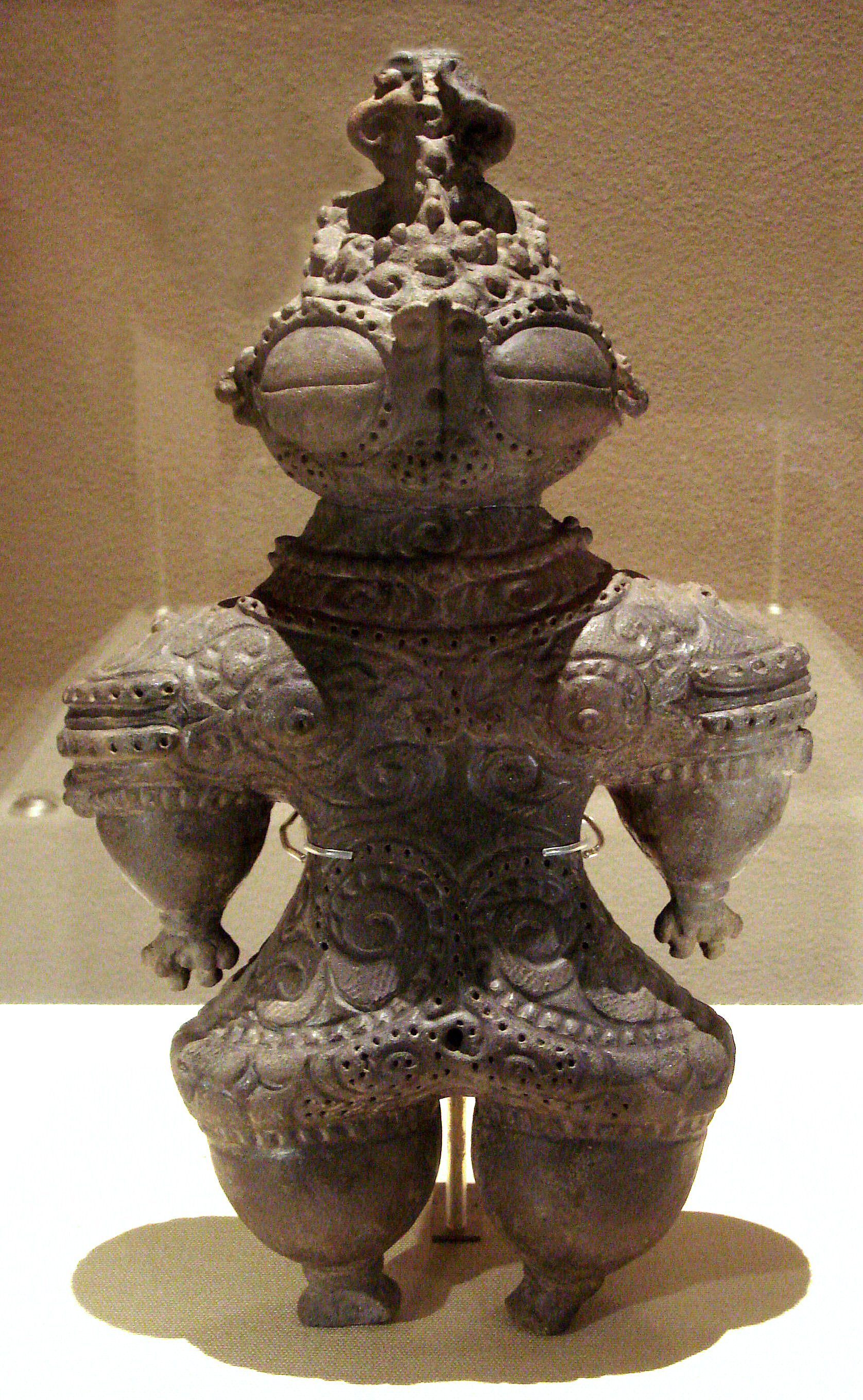
Dogū figurine from the site Ebisuda of Ōsaki, Miyagi prefecture (1000–400 BCE)

During the Late and Final Jōmon period (1500–300 BCE), the weather grew colder, prompting settlers to move away from the mountains. The main food source was fish, which led them to develop fishing tools and techniques. In addition, the increase in the number of vessels suggests that each household had its own stock. Some vessels found during the Late and Final Jōmon Period were damaged which might indicate that they were used for rituals. In addition, figurines were found with distinctive fleshy bodies and goggle-like eyes.

Dogū figurines

Dogū ("earthen figure") are small humanoid and animal figurines dated to the end of the Jōmon period. They were produced all over Japan, except Okinawa. According to some scholars, the dogū were effigies of people and might have been used in sympathetic magic. Dogū are small clay figures, typically 10 to 30 centimetres (4 to 12 inches) high. Most are female, with large eyes, small waists and wide hips. Many have large bellies, suggesting that they were mother goddesses.

=== Yayoi art ===
The next wave of immigrants was the Yayoi people, named for the district in Tokyo where remnants of their settlements first were found. These people, arriving in Japan about 300 BCE, brought their knowledge of wetland rice cultivation, the manufacture of copper weapons and bronze bells (dōtaku), and wheel-thrown, kiln-fired ceramics.

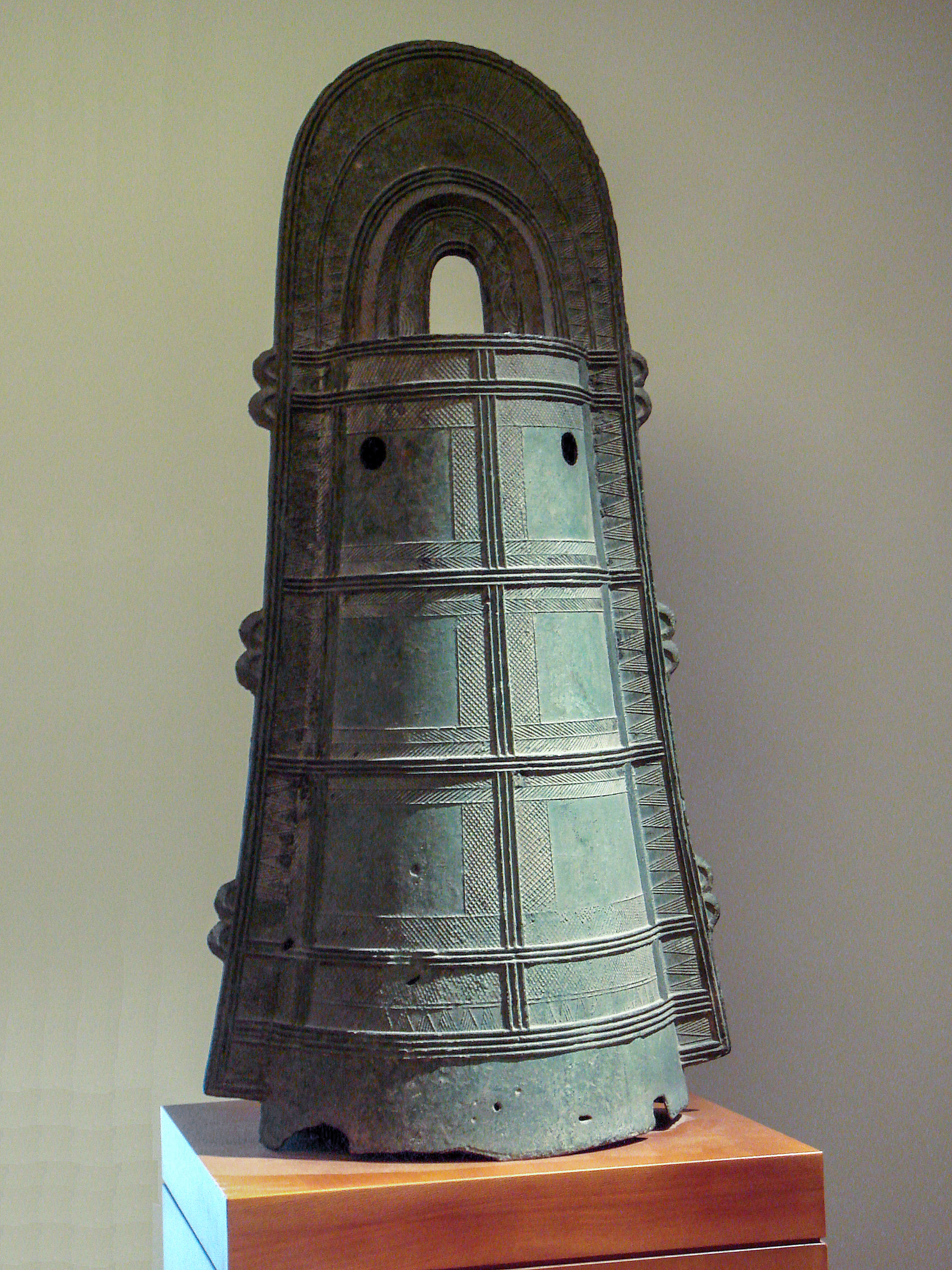
A Yayoi period dōtaku bell, 3rd century CE

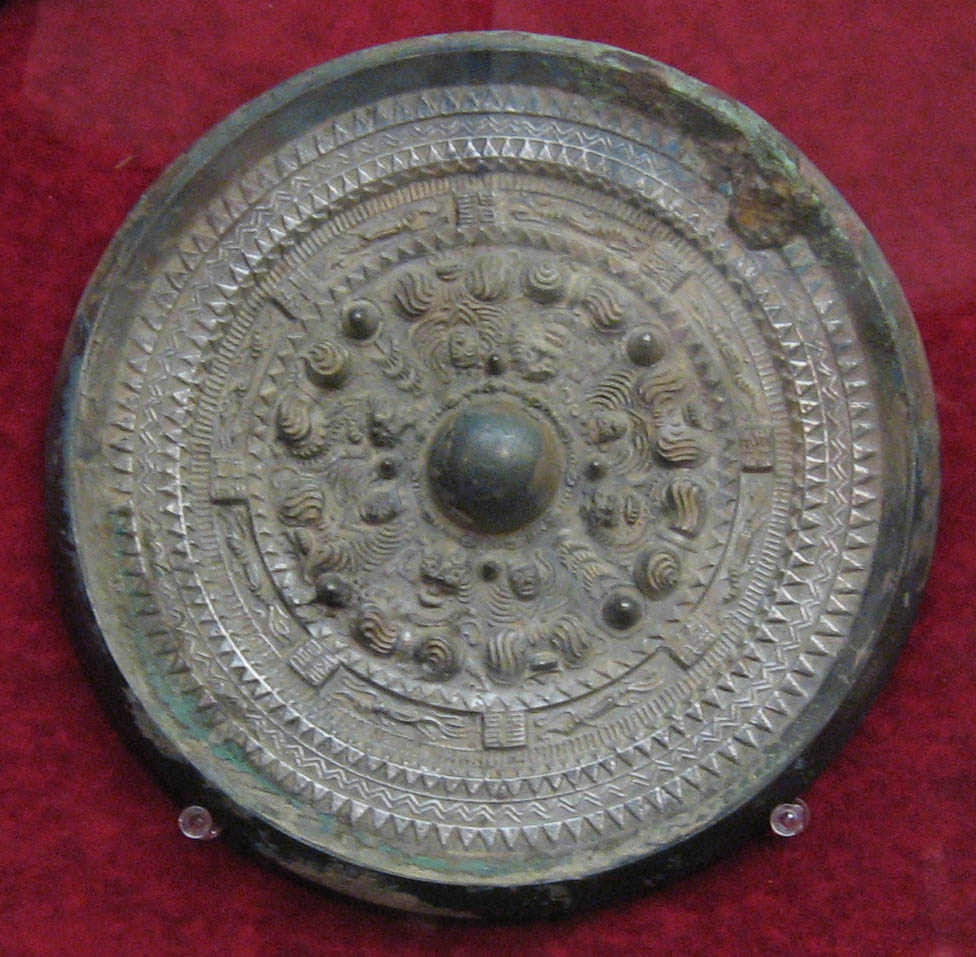
Shinju-kyo bronze mirror excavated in Tsubai-otsukayama kofun, Yamashiro, Kyoto

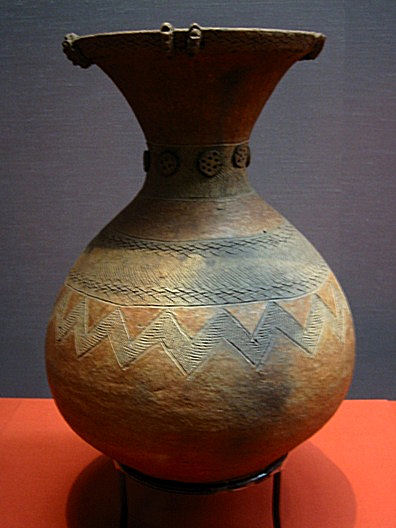
Ceramic jar from the Yayoi period

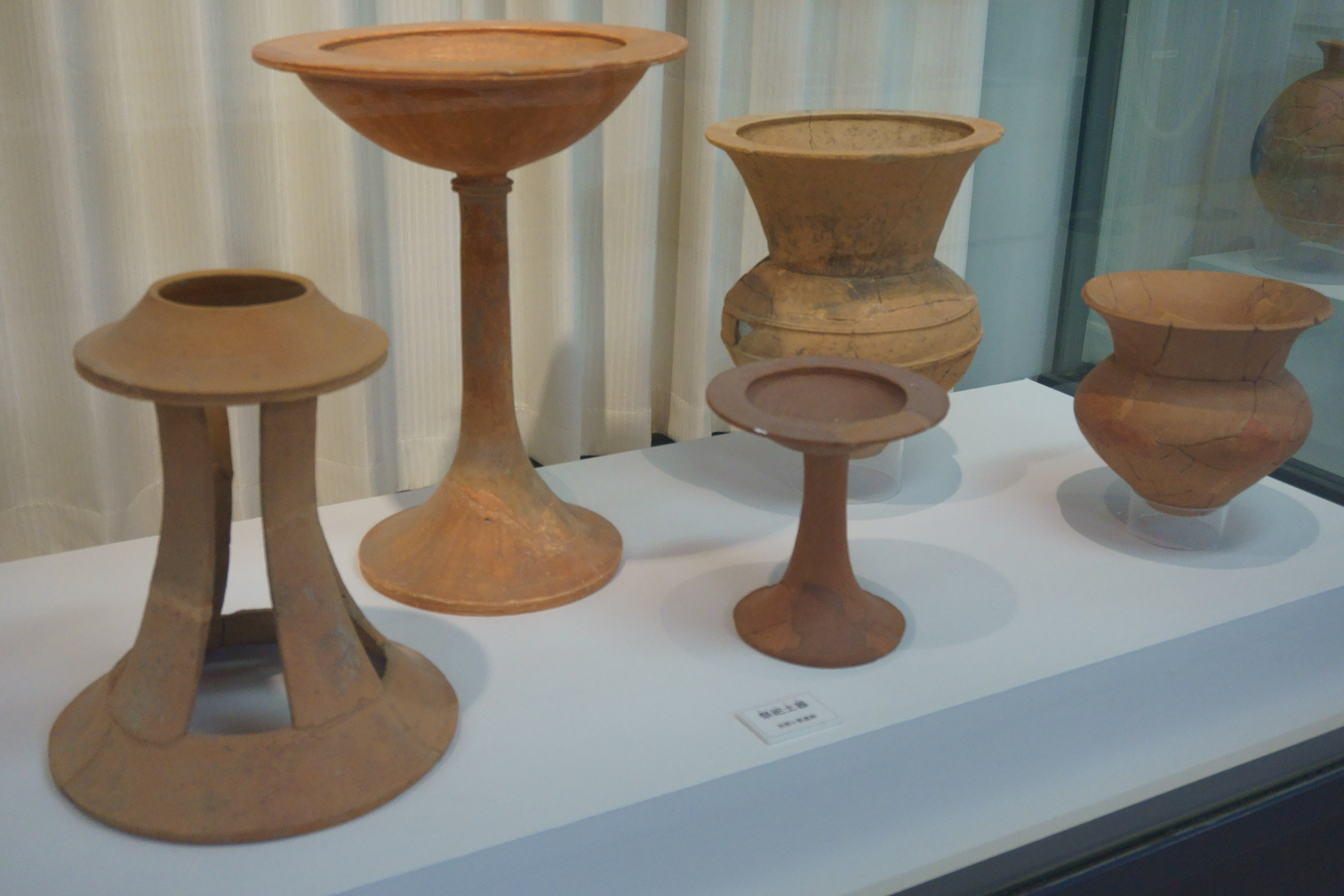
Various ritual Yayoi potteries from Yoshinogari Site

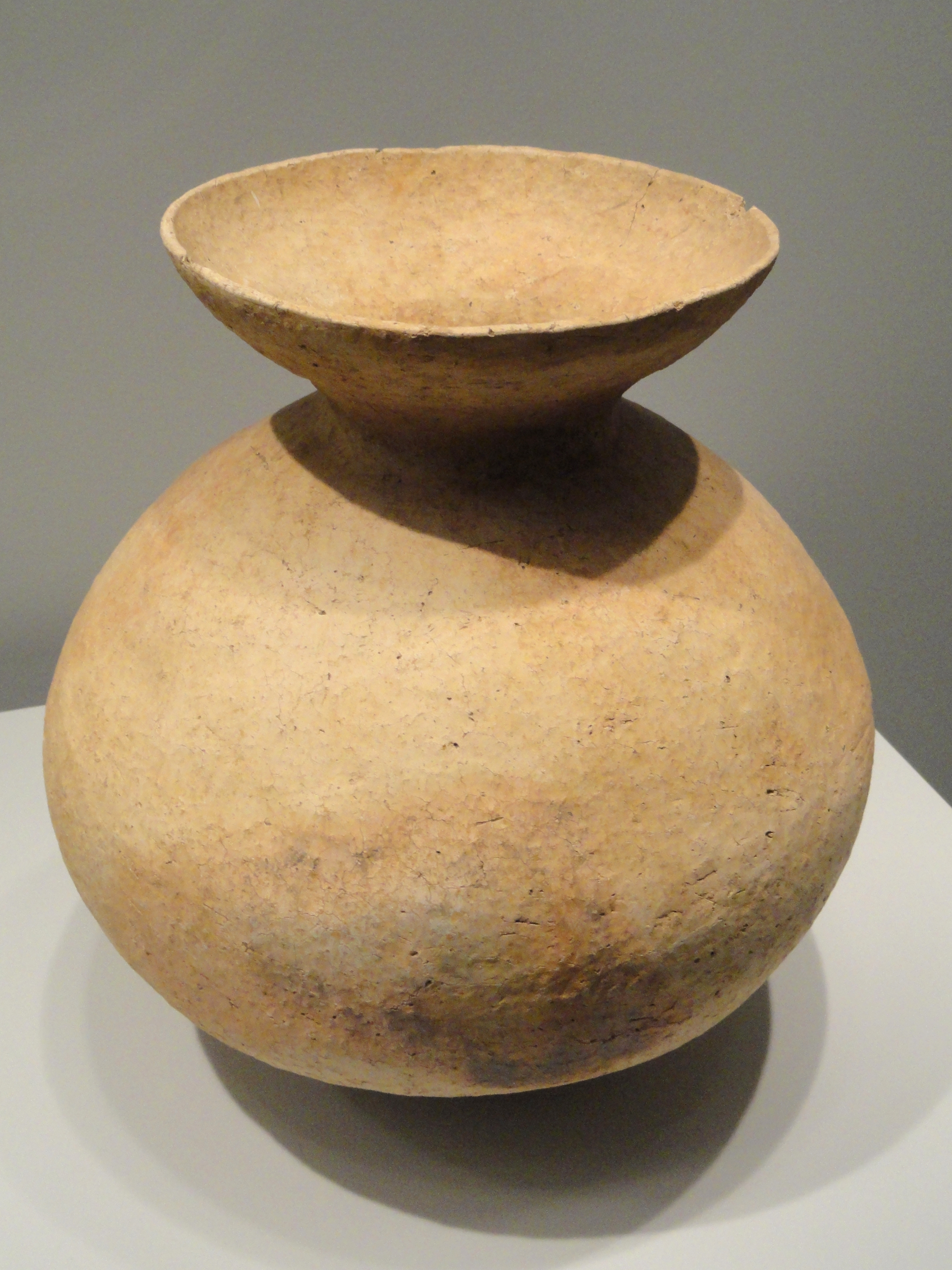
Yayoi storage jar from 500 BCE - 200 CE

=== Kofun period ===
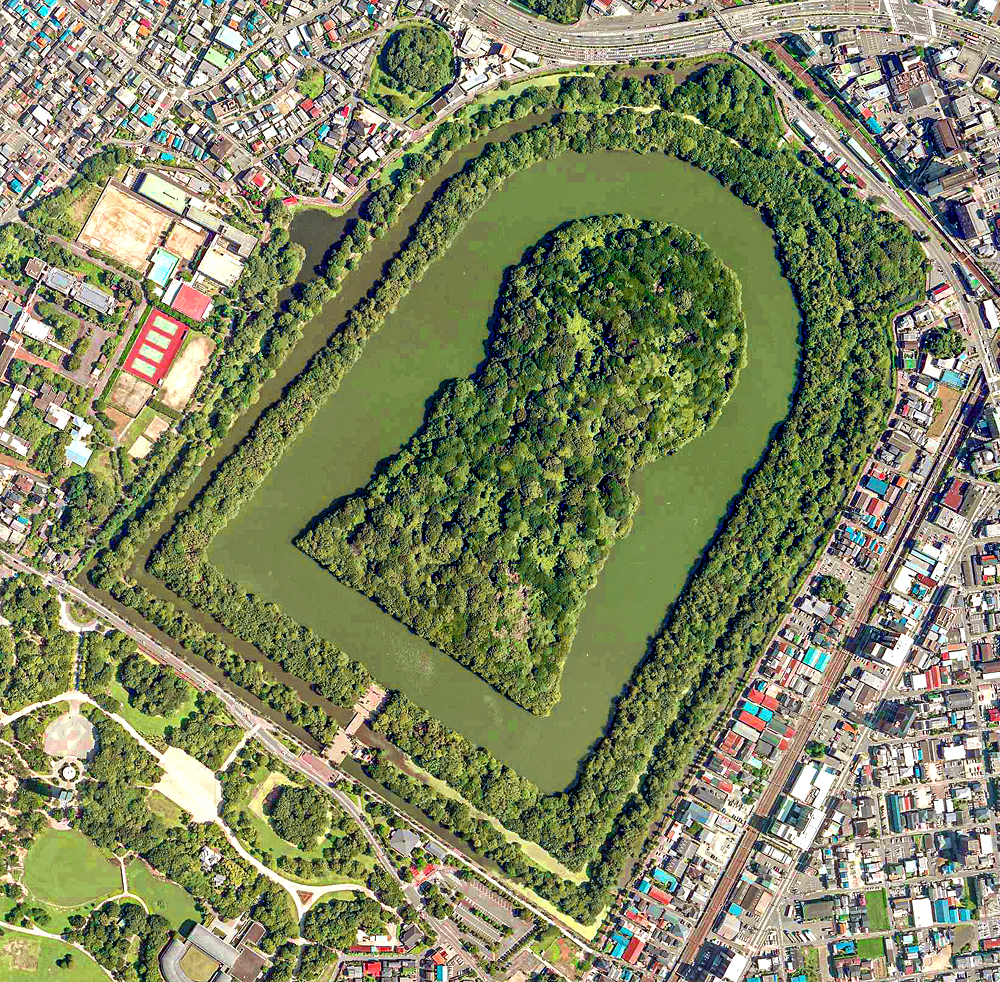
Tomb of Emperor Nintoku located in Sakai, Japan. The keyhole-like tomb is 486 metres long, 305 metres wide at the bottom and 245 metres in diameter.

The third stage in Japanese prehistory, the Kofun period (c. 300 – 710 AD), represents a modification of Yayoi culture, attributable either to internal development or external force. This period is most notable for its tomb culture and other artifacts such as bronze mirrors and clay sculptures called haniwa which were erected outside these tombs. Throughout the Kofun period, the characteristics of these tombs evolved from smaller tombs erected on hilltops and ridges to much larger tombs built on flat land. The largest tomb in Japan, the tomb of Emperor Nintoku, houses 46 burial mounds and is shaped like a keyhole, a distinct characteristic found within later Kofun tombs.

=== Asuka and Nara period ===
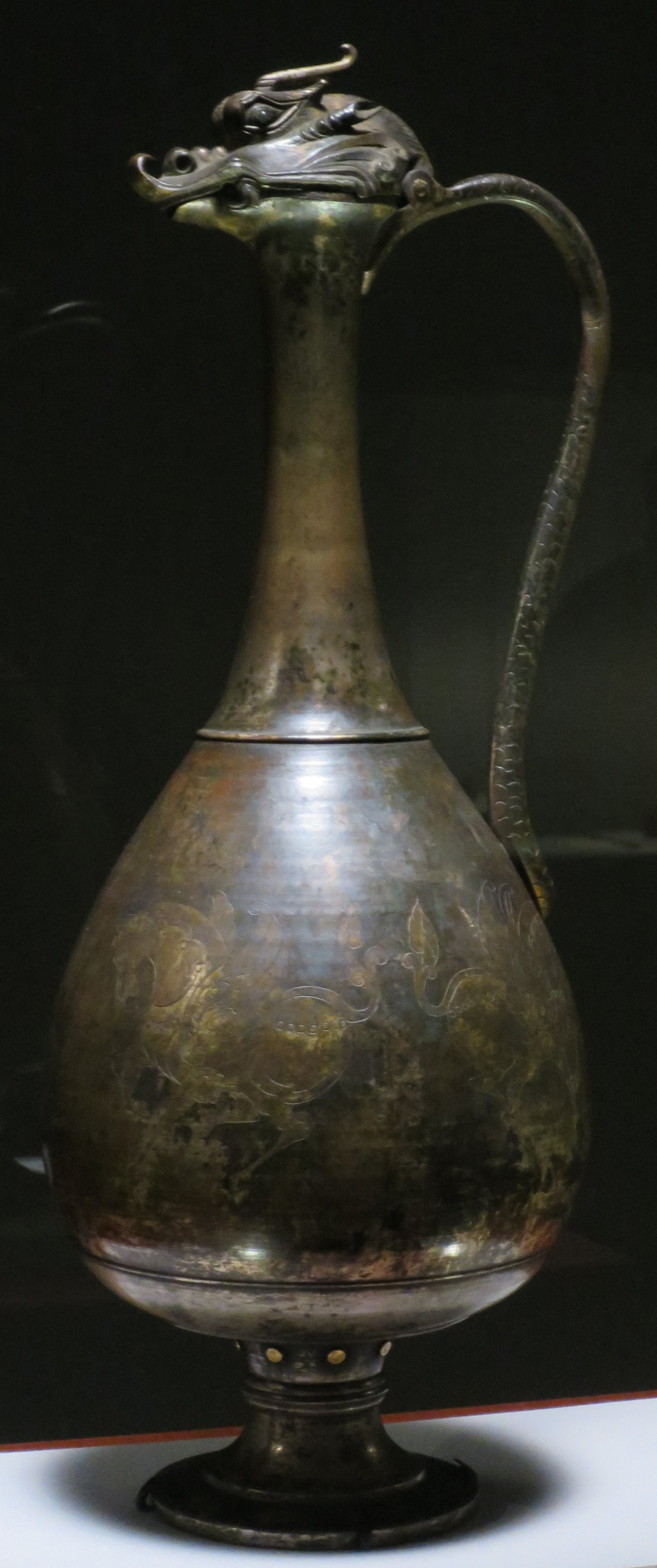
A dragon-head pitcher with Pegasus pattern incised, gilded bronze with silver, Asuka period, 7th century, former Horyu-ji Temple treasures

During the Asuka and Nara periods, so named because the seat of Japanese government was located in the Asuka Valley from 542 to 645 and in the city of Nara until 784, the first significant influx of continental Asian culture took place in Japan.

The transmission of Buddhism provided the initial impetus for contacts between China and Japan. The Japanese recognized the facets of Chinese culture that could profitably be incorporated into their own: a system for converting ideas and sounds into writing; historiography; complex theories of government, such as an effective bureaucracy; and, most important for the arts, new technologies, new building techniques, more advanced methods of casting in bronze, and new techniques and media for painting.

Throughout the 7th and 8th centuries, however, the major focus in contacts between Japan and the Asian continent was the development of Buddhism. Not all scholars agree on the significant dates and the appropriate names to apply to various time periods between 552, the official date of the introduction of Buddhism into Japan, and 784, when the Japanese capital was transferred from Nara. The most common designations are the Suiko period, 552–645; the Hakuhō period, 645–710, and the Tenpyō period, 710–784.

Pagoda and Kondō at Hōryū-ji, 8th century

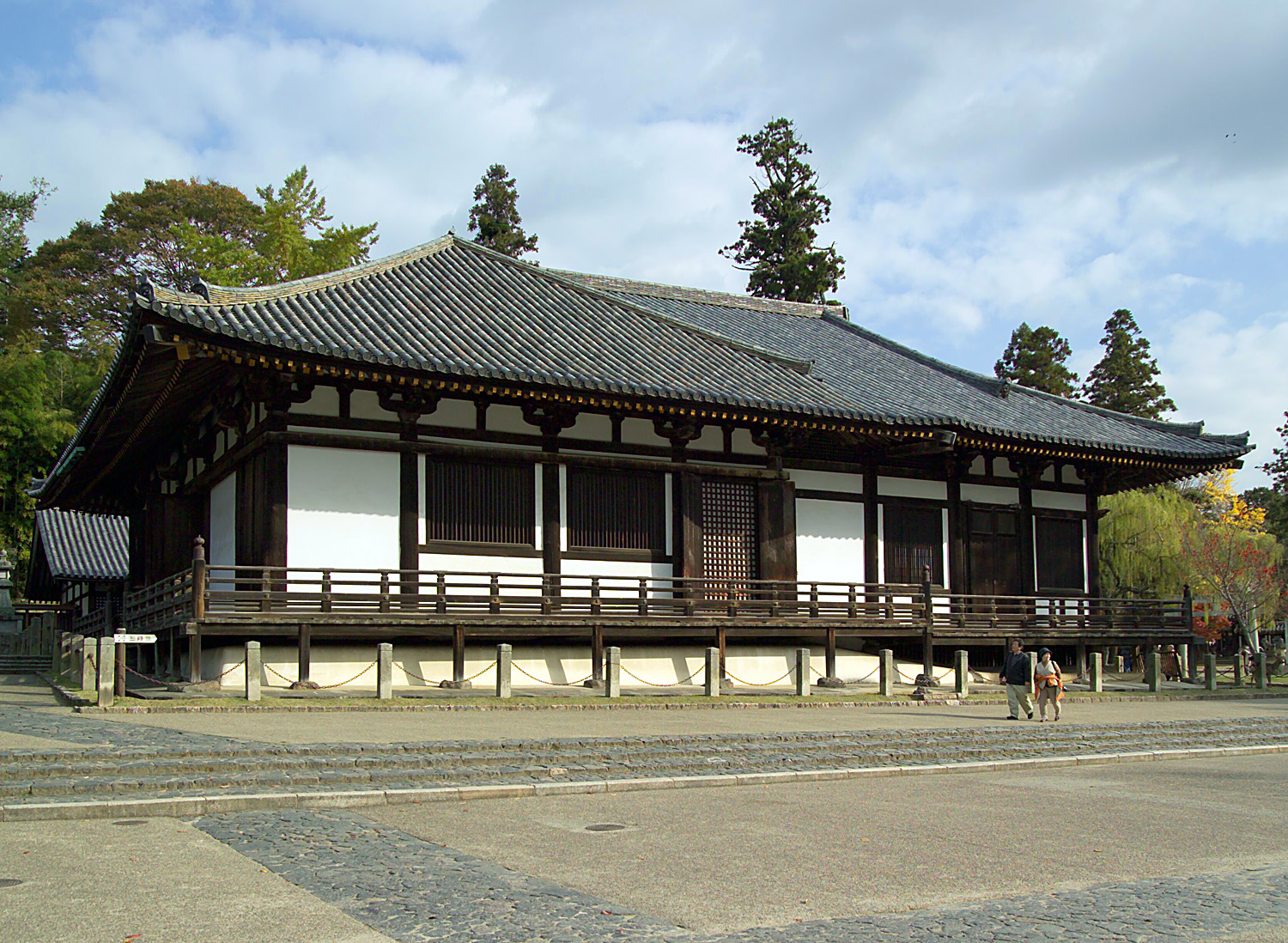
Hokkedō at Tōdai-ji, 8th century

The earliest Japanese sculptures of the Buddha are dated to the 6th and 7th century. They ultimately derive from the 1st- to 3rd-century AD Greco-Buddhist art of Gandhara, characterized by flowing dress patterns and realistic rendering, on which Chinese artistic traits were superimposed. After the Chinese Northern Wei buddhist art had infiltrated a Korean peninsula, Buddhist icons were brought to Japan by Various immigrant groups. Particularly, the semi-seated Maitreya form was adapted into a highly developed Ancient Greek art style which was transmitted to Japan as evidenced by the Kōryū-ji Miroku Bosatsu and the Chūgū-ji Siddhartha statues. Many historians portray Korea as a mere transmitter of Buddhism. The Three Kingdoms, and particularly Baekje, were instrumental as active agents in the introduction and formation of a Buddhist tradition in Japan in 538 or 552. They illustrate the terminal point of the Silk Road transmission of art during the first few centuries of our era. Other examples can be found in the development of the iconography of the Japanese Fūjin Wind God, the Niō guardians, and the near-Classical floral patterns in temple decorations.

The earliest Buddhist structures still extant in Japan, and the oldest wooden buildings in the Far East are found at the Hōryū-ji to the southwest of Nara. First built in the early 7th century as the private temple of Crown Prince Shōtoku, it consists of 41 independent buildings. The most important ones, the main worship hall, or Kondō (Golden Hall), and Gojū-no-tō (Five-story Pagoda), stand in the center of an open area surrounded by a roofed cloister. The Kondō, in the style of Chinese worship halls, is a two-story structure of post-and-beam construction, capped by an irimoya, or hipped-gabled roof of ceramic tiles.

Inside the Kondō, on a large rectangular platform, are some of the most important sculptures of the period. The central image is a Shaka Trinity (623), the historical Buddha flanked by two bodhisattvas, sculpture cast in bronze by the sculptor Tori Busshi (flourished early 7th century) in homage to the recently deceased Prince Shōtoku. At the four corners of the platform are the Guardian Kings of the Four Directions, carved in wood around 650. Also housed at Hōryū-ji is the Tamamushi Shrine, a wooden replica of a Kondō, which is set on a high wooden base that is decorated with figural paintings executed in a medium of mineral pigments mixed with lacquer.

Temple building in the 8th century was focused around the Tōdai-ji in Nara. Constructed as the headquarters for a network of temples in each of the provinces, the Tōdaiji is the most ambitious religious complex erected in the early centuries of Buddhist worship in Japan. Appropriately, the 16.2-m (53-ft) Buddha (completed 752) enshrined in the main Buddha hall, or Daibutsuden, is a Rushana Buddha, the figure that represents the essence of Buddhahood, just as the Tōdaiji represented the center for Imperially sponsored Buddhism and its dissemination throughout Japan. Only a few fragments of the original statue survive, and the present hall and central Buddha are reconstructions from the Edo period.

Clustered around the Daibutsuden on a gently sloping hillside are a number of secondary halls: the Hokke-dō (Lotus Sutra Hall), with its principal image, the Fukukenjaku Kannon (不空羂索観音立像, the most popular bodhisattva), crafted of dry lacquer (cloth dipped in lacquer and shaped over a wooden armature); the Kaidanin (戒壇院, Ordination Hall) with its magnificent clay statues of the Four Guardian Kings; and the storehouse, called the Shōsōin. This last structure is of great importance as an art-historical cache, because in it are stored the utensils that were used in the temple's dedication ceremony in 752, the eye-opening ritual for the Rushana image, as well as government documents and many secular objects owned by the Imperial family.

Choukin (or chōkin), the art of metal engraving or sculpting, is thought to have started in the Nara period.

=== Heian period ===
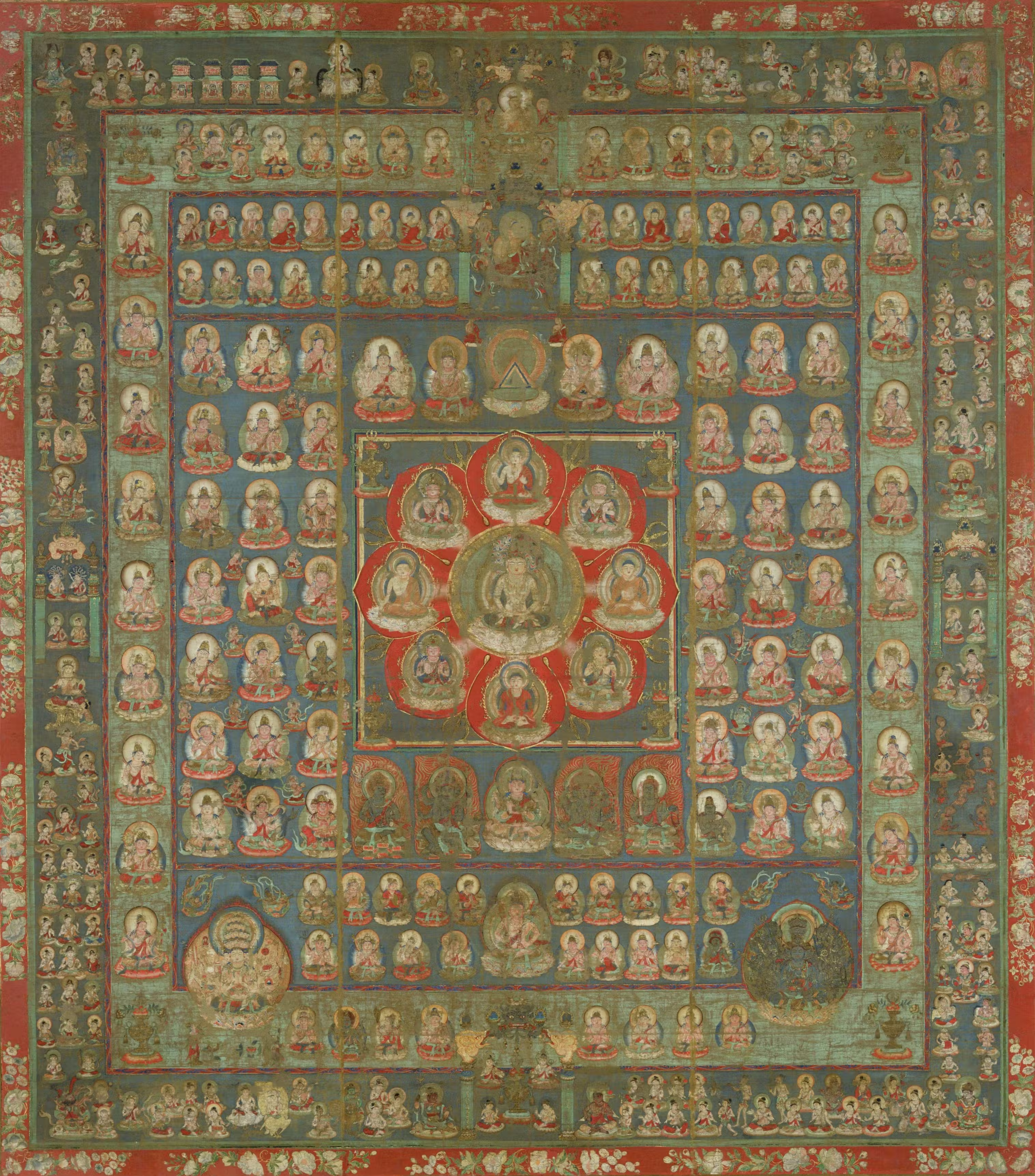
Taizokai (womb realm) Mandala on a silk hanging scroll, 9th century CE

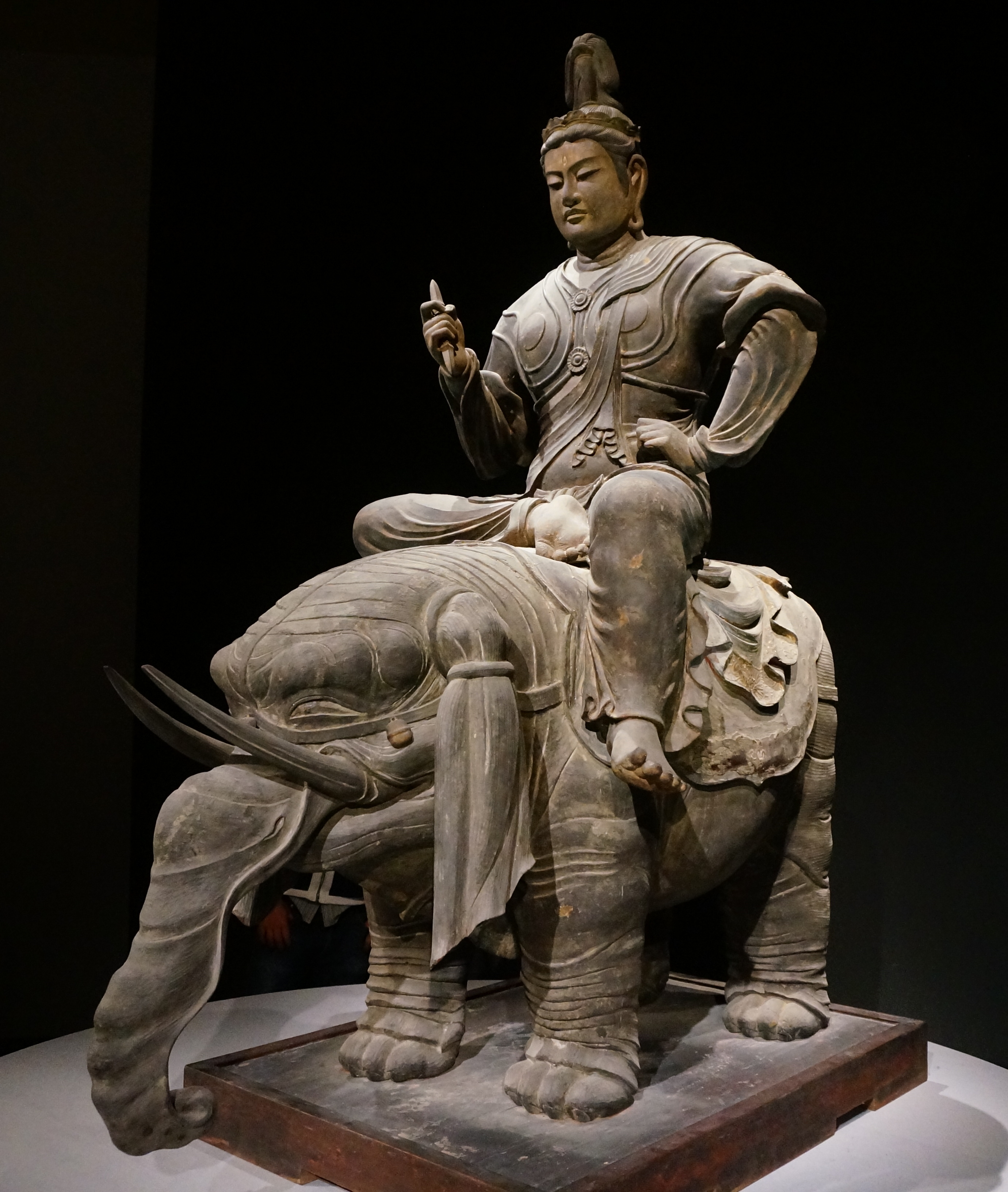
Taishakuten Śakra, 839, Tō-ji

In 794 the capital of Japan was officially transferred to Heian-kyō (present-day Kyoto), where it remained until 1868. The term Heian period refers to the years between 794 and 1185, when the Kamakura shogunate was established at the end of the Genpei War. The period is further divided into the early Heian and the late Heian, or Fujiwara era, the pivotal date being 894, the year imperial embassies to China were officially discontinued.

==== Early Heian art ====
In reaction to the growing wealth and power of organized Buddhism in Nara, the priest Kūkai (best known by his posthumous title Kōbō Daishi, 774–835) journeyed to China to study Shingon, a form of Vajrayana Buddhism, which he introduced into Japan in 806. At the core of Shingon worship is mandalas, diagrams of the spiritual universe, which then began to influence temple design. Japanese Buddhist architecture also adopted the stupa, originally an Indian architectural form, in its Chinese-style pagoda.

The temples erected for this new sect were built in the mountains, far away from the Court and the laity in the capital. The irregular topography of these sites forced Japanese architects to rethink the problems of temple construction, and in so doing to choose more indigenous elements of design. Cypress-bark roofs replaced those of ceramic tile, wood planks were used instead of earthen floors, and a separate worship area for the laity was added in front of the main sanctuary.

The temple that best reflects the spirit of early Heian Shingon temples is the Murō-ji (early 9th century), set deep in a stand of cypress trees on a mountain southeast of Nara. The wooden image (also early 9th century) of Shakyamuni, the "historic" Buddha, enshrined in a secondary building at the Murō-ji, is typical of the early Heian sculpture, with its ponderous body, covered by thick drapery folds carved in the honpa-shiki (rolling-wave) style, and its austere, withdrawn facial expression.

==== Fujiwara art ====
In the Fujiwara period, Pure Land Buddhism, which offered easy salvation through belief in Amida (the Buddha of the Western Paradise), became popular. This period is named after the Fujiwara family, then the most powerful in the country, who ruled as regents for the Emperor, becoming, in effect, civil dictators. Concurrently, the Kyoto nobility developed a society devoted to elegant aesthetic pursuits. So secure and beautiful was their world that they could not conceive of Paradise as being much different. They created a new form of Buddha hall, the Amida hall, which blends the secular with the religious, and houses one or more Buddha images within a structure resembling the mansions of the nobility.

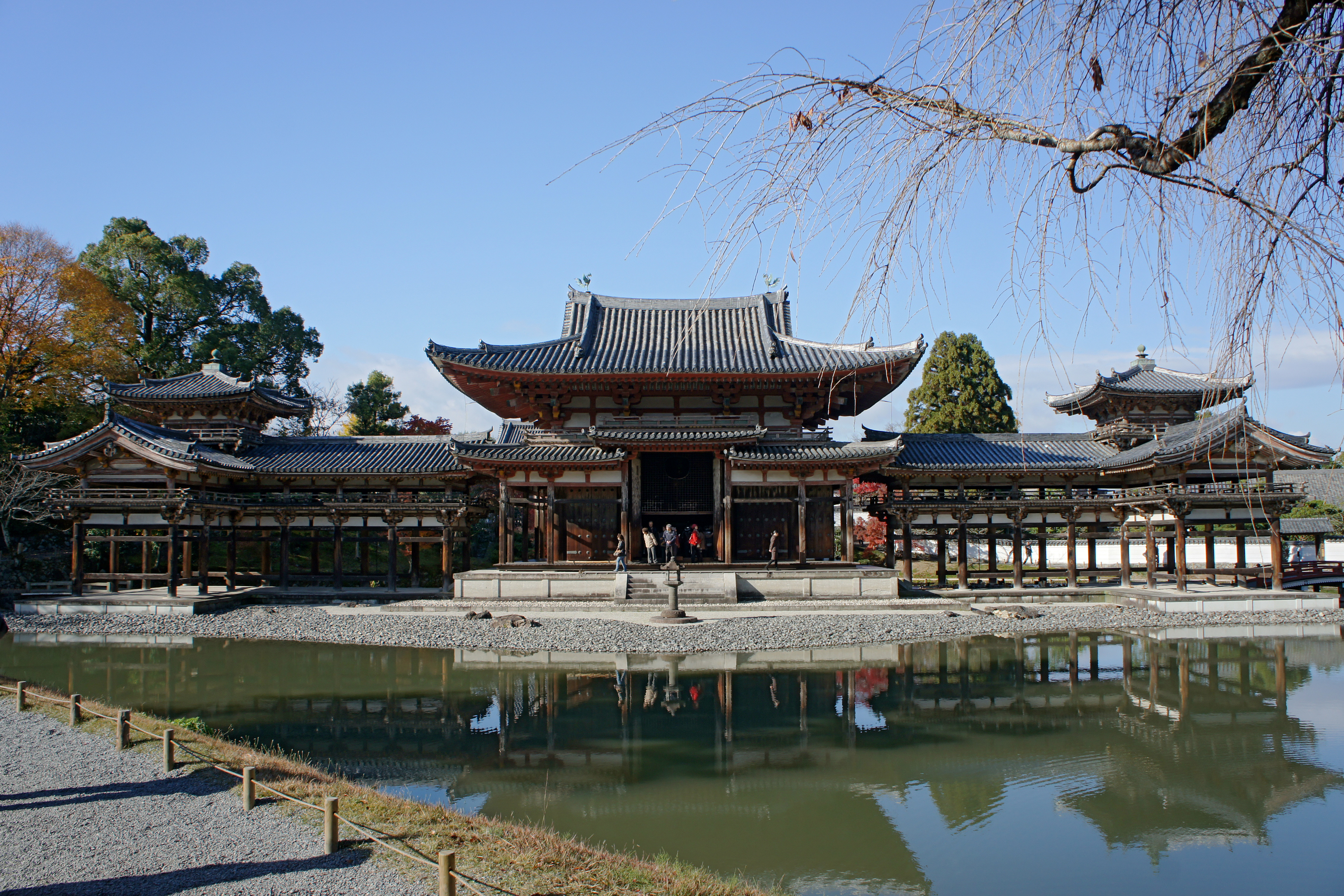
Byōdō-in Phoenix Hall, Uji, Kyoto

The Hō-ō-dō (Phoenix Hall, completed 1053) of the Byōdō-in, a temple in Uji to the southeast of Kyoto, is the exemplar of Fujiwara Amida halls. It consists of a main rectangular structure flanked by two L-shaped wing corridors and a tail corridor, set at the edge of a large artificial pond. Inside, a single golden image of Amida (c. 1053) is installed on a high platform. The Amida sculpture was executed by Jōchō, who used a new canon of proportions and a new technique (yosegi), in which multiple pieces of wood are carved out like shells and joined from the inside. Applied to the walls of the hall are small relief carvings of celestials, the host believed to have accompanied Amida when he descended from the Western Paradise to gather the souls of believers at the moment of death and transport them in lotus blossoms to Paradise. Raigō paintings on the wooden doors of the Hō-ō-dō, depicting the Descent of the Amida Buddha, are an early example of Yamato-e, Japanese-style painting, and contain representations of the scenery around Kyoto.

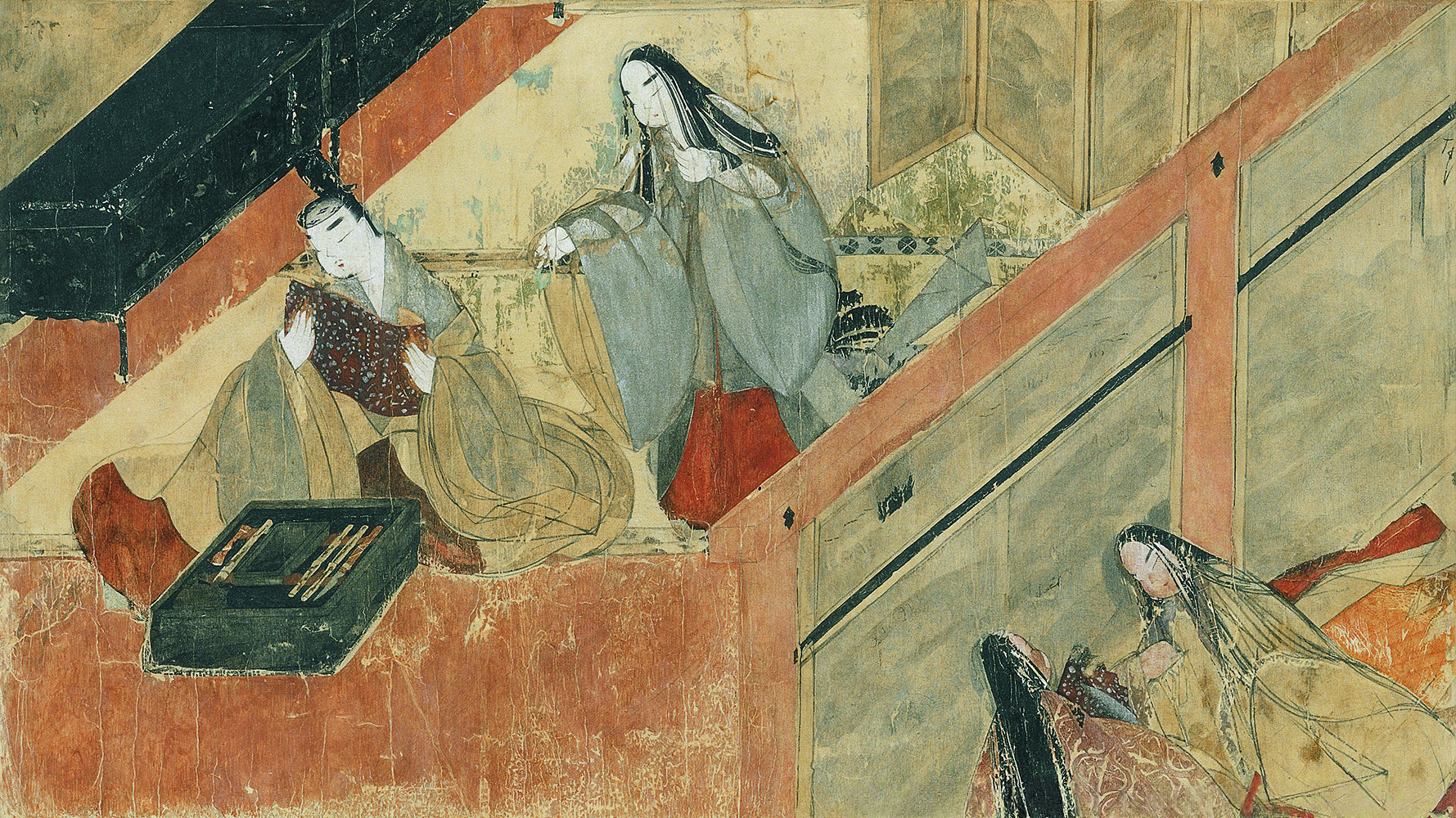
"YUGIRI" of Genji Monogatari Emaki

==== E-maki ====
In the last century of the Heian period, the horizontal, illustrated narrative handscroll, known as e-maki (絵巻, lit. "picture scroll"), came to the fore. Dating from about 1130, the Genji Monogatari Emaki, a famous illustrated Tale of Genji represents the earliest surviving yamato-e handscroll, and one of the high points of Japanese painting. Written about the year 1000 by Murasaki Shikibu, a lady-in-waiting to the Empress Shōshi, the novel deals with the life and loves of Genji and the world of the Heian court after his death. The 12th-century artists of the e-maki version devised a system of pictorial conventions that convey visually the emotional content of each scene. In the second half of the century, a different, livelier style of continuous narrative illustration became popular. The Ban Dainagon Ekotoba (late 12th century), a scroll that deals with an intrigue at court, emphasizes figures in active motion depicted in rapidly executed brush strokes and thin but vibrant colors.

E-maki also serve as some of the earliest and greatest examples of the otoko-e ("men's pictures") and onna-e ("women's pictures") styles of painting. There are many fine differences in the two styles, appealing to the aesthetic preferences of the genders. But perhaps most easily noticeable are the differences in subject matter. Onna-e, epitomized by the Tale of Genji handscroll, typically deals with court life, particularly the court ladies, and with romantic themes. Otoko-e often recorded historical events, particularly battles. The Siege of the Sanjō Palace (1160), depicted in the "Night Attack on the Sanjō Palace" section of the Heiji Monogatari handscroll is a famous example of this style.

=== Kamakura period ===
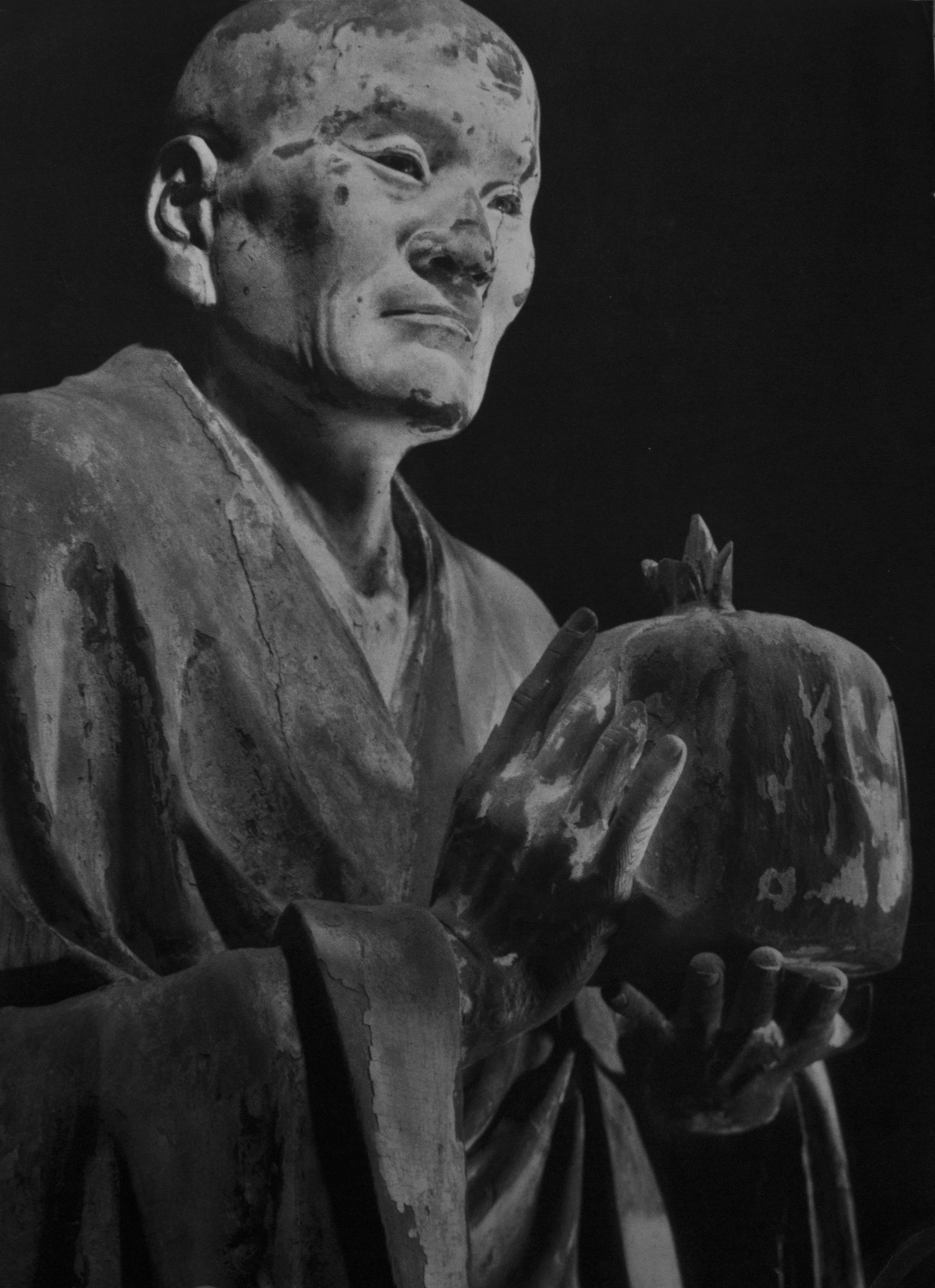
Muchaku by Unkei, Kōfuku-ji, 1212, National Treasure

In 1180, a war broke out between the two most powerful warrior clans: the Taira and the Minamoto; five years later the Minamoto emerged victorious and established a de facto seat of government at the seaside village of Kamakura, where it remained until 1333. With the shift of power from the nobility to the warrior class, the arts had to satisfy a new audience: men devoted to the skills of warfare, priests committed to making Buddhism available to illiterate commoners, and conservatives, the nobility and some members of the priesthood who regretted the declining power of the court. Thus, realism, a popularizing trend, and a classical revival characterize the art of the Kamakura period. In the Kamakura period, Kyoto and Nara remained the centres of artistic production and high culture.

==== Sculpture ====
The Kei school of sculptors, particularly Unkei, created a new, more realistic style of sculpture. The two Niō guardian images (1203) in the Great South Gate of the Tōdai-ji in Nara illustrate .Unkei's dynamic supra-realistic style. The images, about 8 m (about 26 ft) tall, were carved of multiple blocks in a period of about three months, a feat indicative of a developed studio system of artisans working under the direction of a master sculptor. Unkei's polychromed wood sculptures (1208, Kōfuku-ji, Nara) of two Indian sages, Muchaku and Seshin, the legendary founders of the Hossō sect, are among the most accomplished realistic works of the period; as rendered by Unkei, they are remarkably individualized and believable images. One of the most famous works of this period is an Amitabha Triad (completed in 1195), in Jōdo-ji in Ono, created by Kaikei, Unkei's successor.

==== Calligraphy and painting ====
The Kegon Engi Emaki, the illustrated history of the founding of the Kegon sect, is an excellent example of the popularizing trend in Kamakura painting. The Kegon sect, one of the most important in the Nara period, fell on hard times during the ascendancy of the Pure Land sects. After the Genpei War (1180–1185), Priest Myōe of Kōzan-ji sought to revive the sect and also to provide a refuge for women widowed by the war. The wives of samurai had been discouraged from learning more than a syllabary system for transcribing sounds and ideas (see kana), and most were incapable of reading texts that employed Chinese ideographs (kanji).

Thus, the Kegon Engi Emaki combines passages of text, written with a maximum of easily readable syllables, and illustrations that have the dialogue between characters written next to the speakers, a technique comparable to contemporary comic strips. The plot of the e-maki, the lives of the two Korean priests who founded the Kegon sect, is swiftly paced and filled with fantastic feats such as a journey to the palace of the Ocean King, and a poignant mom story.

A work in a more conservative vein is the illustrated version of Murasaki Shikibu's diary. E-maki versions of her novel continued to be produced, but the nobility, attuned to the new interest in realism yet nostalgic for past days of wealth and power, revived and illustrated the diary in order to recapture the splendor of the author's times. One of the most beautiful passages illustrates the episode in which Murasaki Shikibu is playfully held prisoner in her room by two young courtiers, while, just outside, moonlight gleams on the mossy banks of a rivulet in the imperial garden.

=== Muromachi period ===
During the Muromachi period (1338–1573), also called the Ashikaga period, a profound change took place in Japanese culture. The Ashikaga clan took control of the shogunate and moved its headquarters back to Kyoto, to the Muromachi district of the city. With the return of government to the capital, the popularizing trends of the Kamakura period came to an end, and cultural expression took on a more aristocratic, elitist character. Zen Buddhism, the Ch'an sect traditionally thought to have been founded in China in the 6th century, was introduced for a second time into Japan and took root.

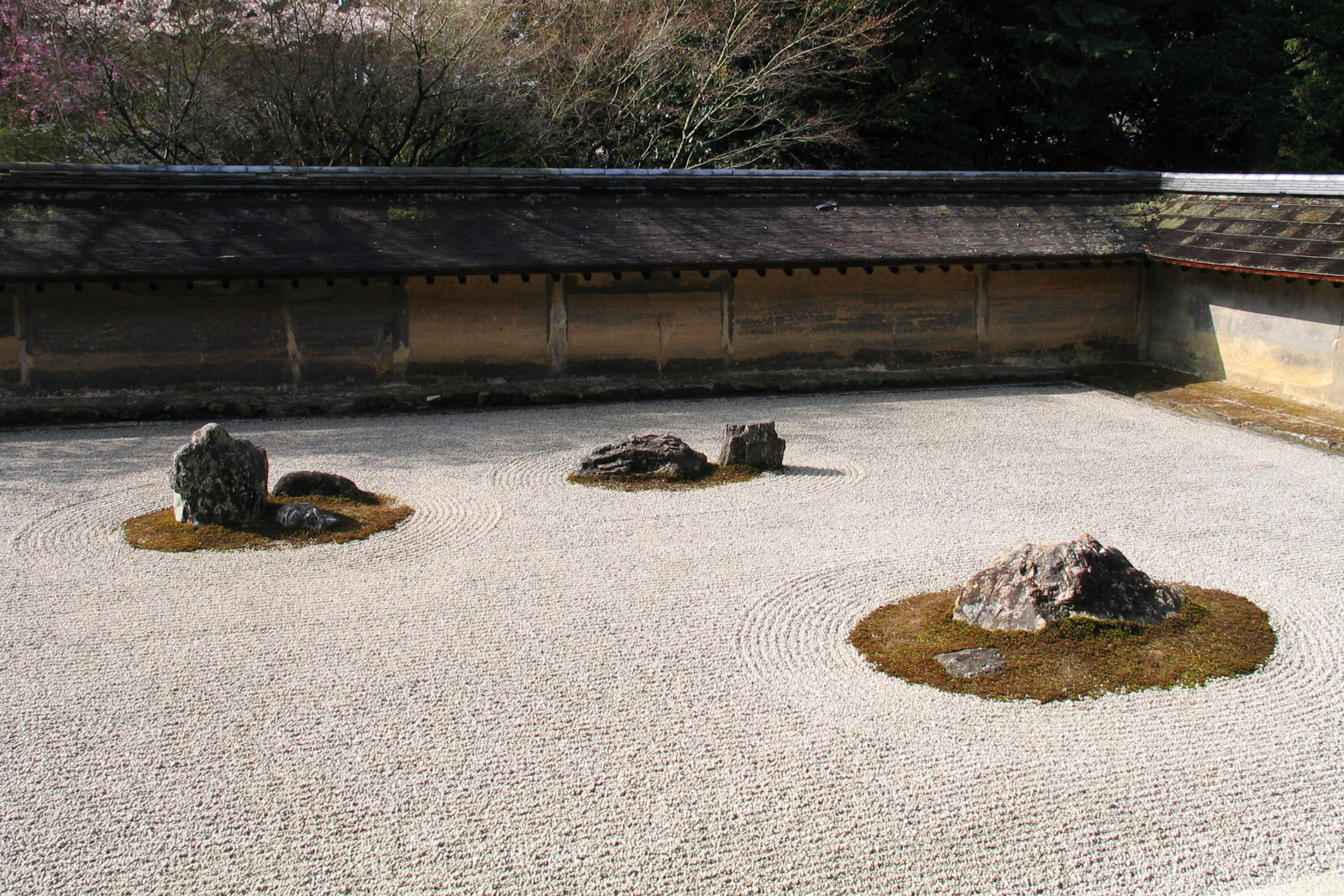
Karesansui of Ryōan-ji, Kyoto

==== Painting ====
Because of secular ventures and trading missions to China organized by Zen temples, many Chinese paintings and objects of art were imported into Japan and profoundly influenced Japanese artists working for Zen temples and the shogunate. Not only did these imports change the subject matter of painting, but they also modified the use of color; the bright colors of Yamato-e yielded to the monochromes of painting in the Chinese manner, where paintings generally only have black and white or different tones of a single color.

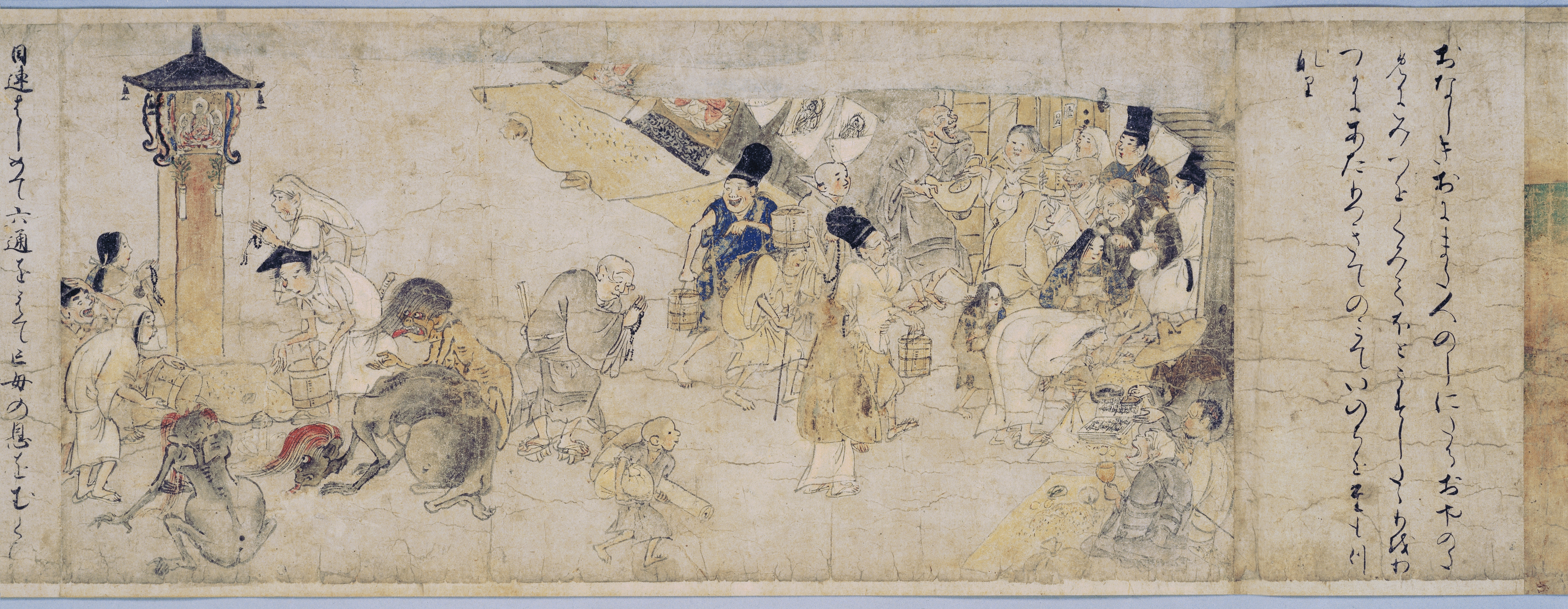
The hungry ghosts of Kyoto

Typical of early Muromachi painting is the depiction by the priest-painter Kao (active early 15th century) of the legendary monk Kensu (Hsien-tzu in Chinese) at the moment he achieved enlightenment. This type of painting was executed with quick brush strokes and a minimum of detail. Catching a Catfish with a Gourd (early 15th century, Taizō-in, Myōshin-ji, Kyoto), by the priest-painter Josetsu (active c. 1400), marks a turning point in Muromachi painting. Executed originally for a low-standing screen, it has been remounted as a hanging scroll with inscriptions by contemporary figures above, one of which refers to the painting as being in the "new style". In the foreground a man is depicted on the bank of a stream holding a small gourd and looking at a large slithery catfish. Mist fills the middle ground, and the background mountains appear to be far in the distance. It is generally assumed that the "new style" of the painting, executed about 1413, refers to a more Chinese sense of deep space within the picture plane.

The foremost artists of the Muromachi period are the priest-painters Shūbun and Sesshū. Shūbun, a monk at the Kyoto temple of Shōkoku-ji, created in the painting Reading in a Bamboo Grove (1446) a realistic landscape with deep recession into space. Sesshū, unlike most artists of the period, was able to journey to China and study Chinese painting at its source. Landscape of the Four Seasons (Sansui Chokan; c. 1486) is one of Sesshu's most accomplished works, depicting a continuing landscape through the four seasons.

=== Azuchi-Momoyama period ===
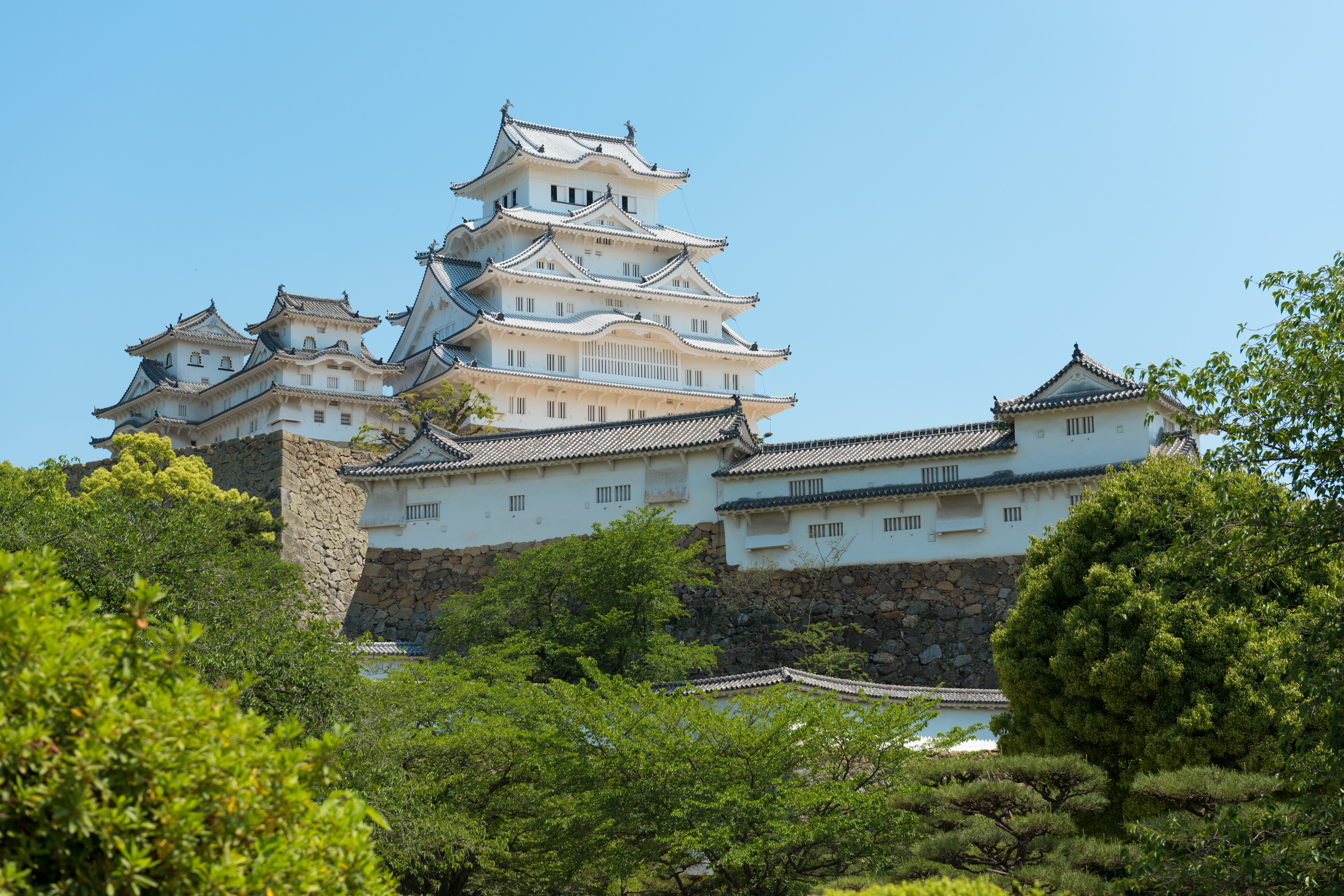
Himeji Castle, built in 1580–1609

In the Azuchi–Momoyama period (1573–1603), a succession of military leaders, such as Oda Nobunaga, Toyotomi Hideyoshi, and Tokugawa Ieyasu, attempted to bring peace and political stability to Japan after an era of almost 100 years of warfare. Oda, a minor chieftain, acquired power sufficient to take de facto control of the government in 1568 and, five years later, to oust the last Ashikaga shōgun. Hideyoshi took command after Oda's death, but his plans to establish hereditary rule were foiled by Ieyasu, who established the Tokugawa shogunate in 1603.

Cypress Trees Byōbu, folding screen by Kanō Eitoku, 1590

==== Painting ====
The most important school of painting in the Momoyama period was that of the Kanō school, and the greatest innovation of the period was the formula, developed by Kanō Eitoku, for the creation of monumental landscapes on the sliding doors enclosing a room. The decoration of the main room facing the garden of the Jukō-in, a subtemple of Daitoku-ji (a Zen temple in Kyoto), is perhaps the best extant example of Eitoku's work. A massive ume tree and twin pines are depicted on pairs of sliding screens in diagonally opposite corners, their trunks repeating the verticals of the corner posts and their branches extending to left and right, unifying the adjoining panels. Eitoku's screen, Chinese Lions, also in Kyoto, reveals the bold, brightly colored style of painting preferred by the samurai.

Hasegawa Tōhaku, a contemporary of Eitoku, developed a somewhat different and more decorative style for large-scale screen paintings. In his Maple Screen (楓図), now in the temple of Chishaku-in (ja:智積院), Kyoto, he placed the trunk of the tree in the center and extended the limbs nearly to the edge of the composition, creating a flatter, less architectonic work than Eitoku, but a visually gorgeous painting. His sixfold screen, Pine Wood (松林図), is a masterly rendering in monochrome ink of a grove of trees enveloped in mist.

=== Edo period ===
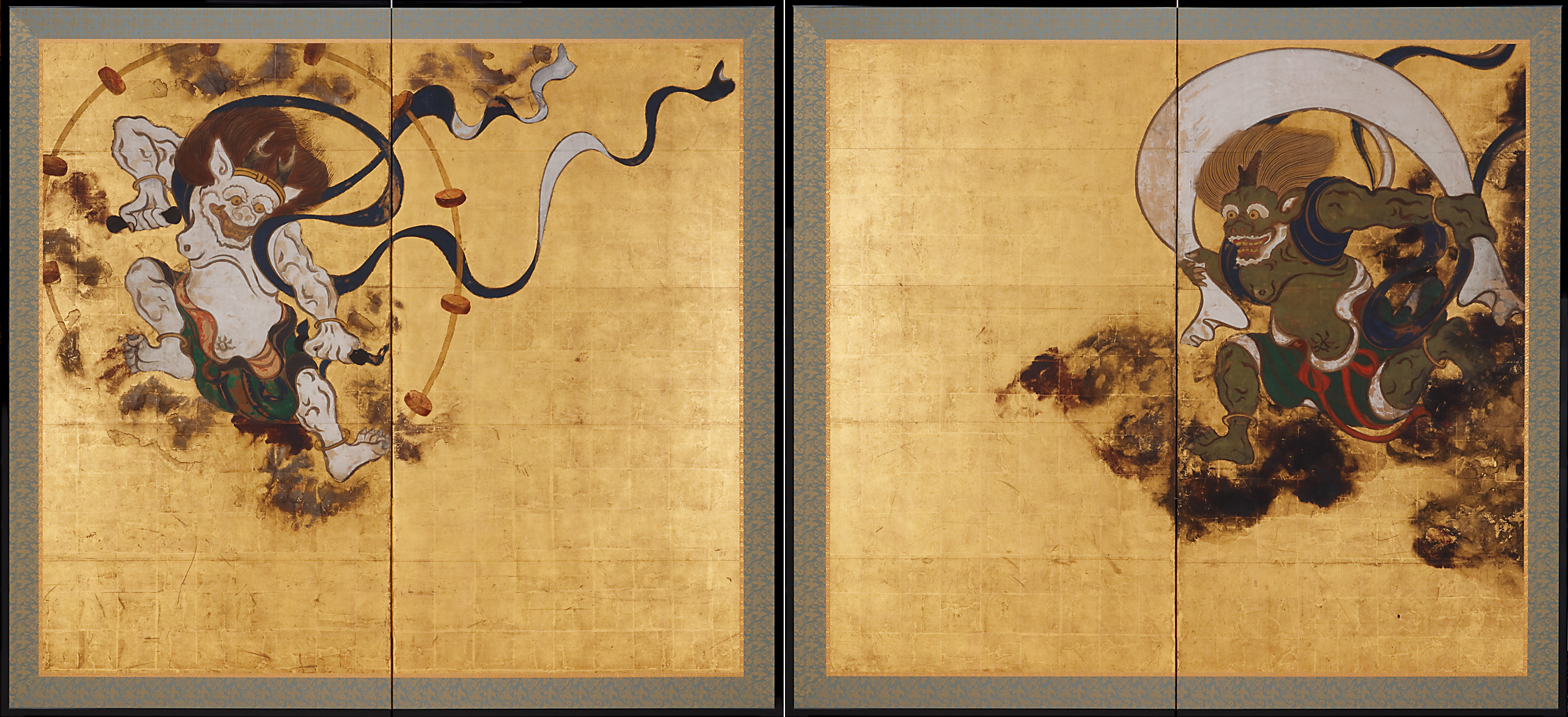
Wind God and Thunder God, Tawaraya Sōtatsu, 17th century

The Tokugawa shogunate gained undisputed control of the government in 1603 with a commitment to bring peace and economic and political stability to the country; in large measure it was successful. The shogunate survived until 1867, when it was forced to capitulate because of its failure to deal with pressure from Western nations to open the country to foreign trade. One of the dominant themes in the Edo period was the repressive policies of the shogunate and the attempts of artists to escape these strictures. The foremost of these was the closing of the country to foreigners and the accoutrements of their cultures, and the imposition of strict codes of behaviour affecting every aspect of life, the clothes one wore, the person one married, and the activities one could or should not pursue.

In the early years of the Edo period, however, the full impact of Tokugawa policies had not yet been felt, and some of Japan's finest expressions in architecture and painting were produced: Katsura Palace in Kyoto and the paintings of Tawaraya Sōtatsu, pioneer of the Rinpa school.

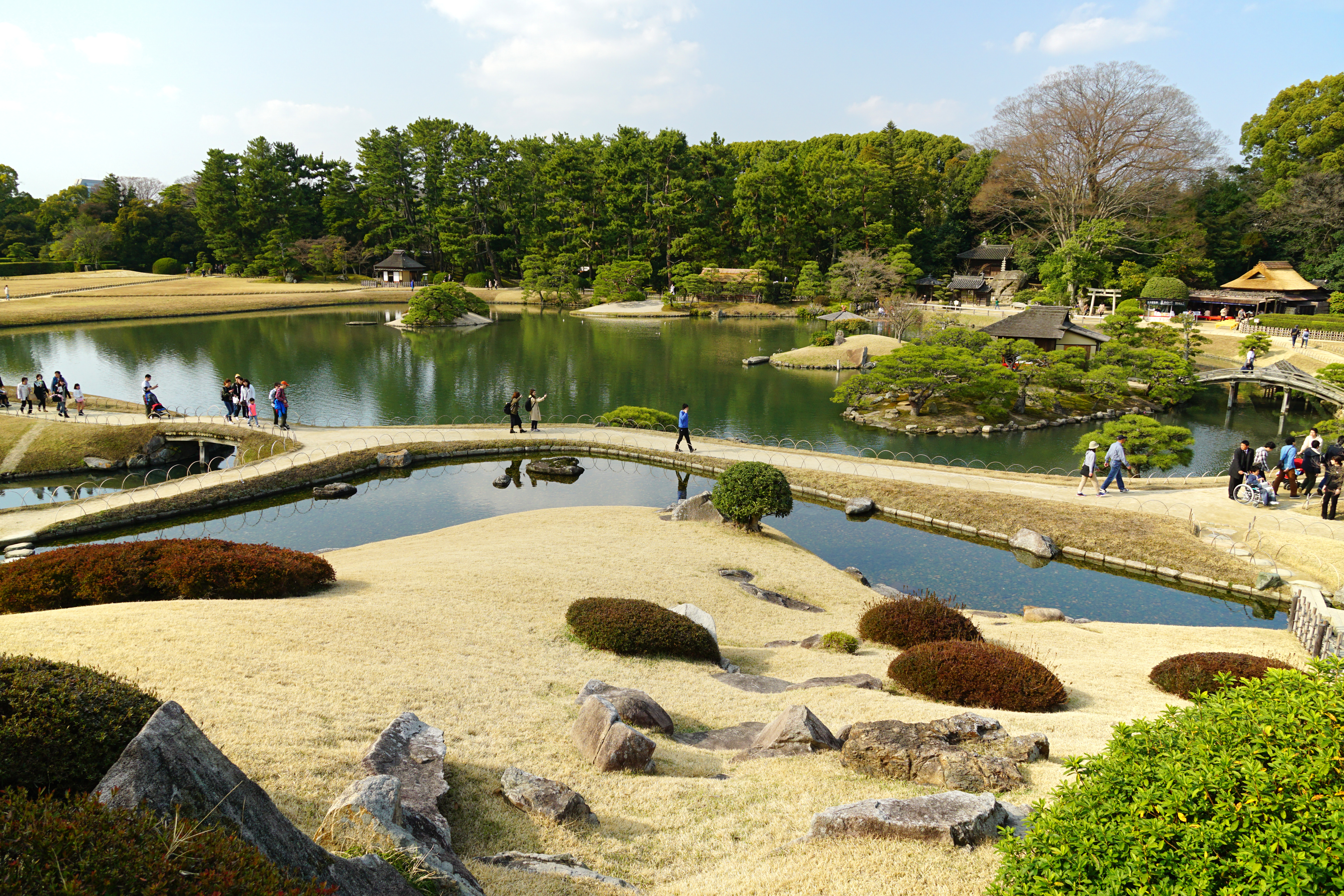
Circuit style Japanese garden Kōraku-en in Okayama, begun in 1700

==== Woodblock printing ====
Woodblock prints were originally used to translate Buddhist scriptures in the eighth century in Japan. Woodblock printing consist of the engraving of images or pictures on a piece of wood, which is then pressed against a piece of paper. In the eighth century woodblock was considered a convenient method of the reproduction of printed text until further innovations allowed for color to be translated on paper or better known as Nishik-e prints. Wood block printing was the common method of printing from the eleventh until the nineteenth century. Nishiki-e prints produced goods such as calendars that were commonly sold to wealthy members of society during the Edo period. In the Edo period these prints were depicted events and scenes of prominent actors. Ukiyo then was associated to woodblock printing in the early Edo period. These Ukiyo paintings depicted daily lives of prominent members of society. Ukiyo first started out as hand sculpted scrolls depicted life as a normal commoner.

==== Architecture ====
Katsura Detached Palace, built in imitation of Genji's palace, contains a cluster of shoin buildings that combine elements of classic Japanese architecture with innovative restatements. The whole complex is surrounded by a beautiful garden with paths for walking. Many of powerful daimyōs (feudal lords) built a Circuit style Japanese garden in the territory country, and competed for the beauty.

==== Painting ====
Sōtatsu evolved a superb decorative style by re-creating themes from classical literature, using brilliantly colored figures and motifs from the natural world set against gold-leaf backgrounds. One of his finest works is the pair of screens, Waves at Matsushima, in the Freer Gallery in Washington, D.C. A century later, Kōrin reworked Sōtatsu's style and created visually gorgeous works uniquely his own. Perhaps his finest are the screen paintings of Red and White Plum Blossoms.

==== Sculpture ====
The Buddhist monk Enkū carved 120,000 Buddhist images in a rough, individual style.

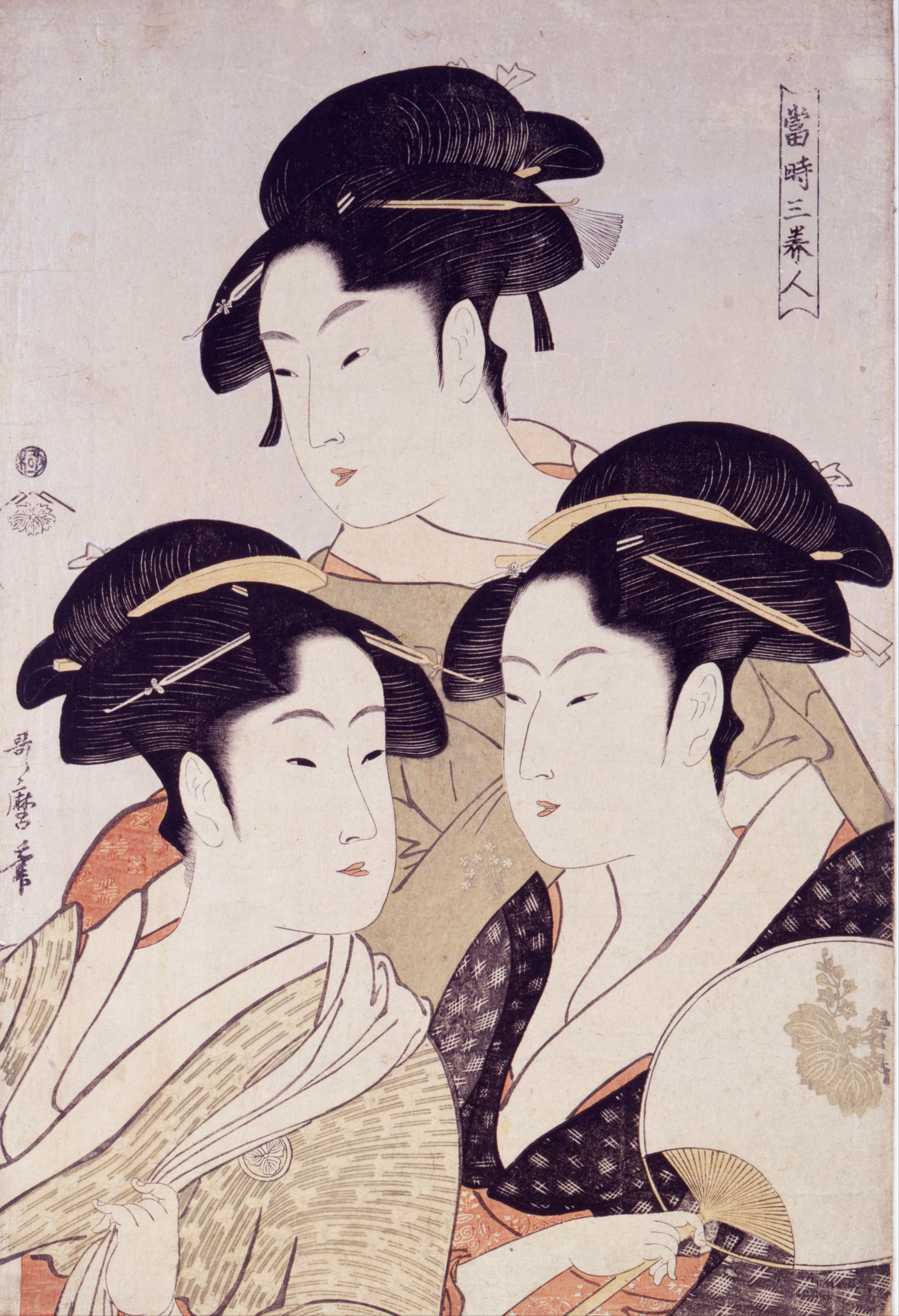
Three Beauties of the Present Day, by Utamaro, c. 1793

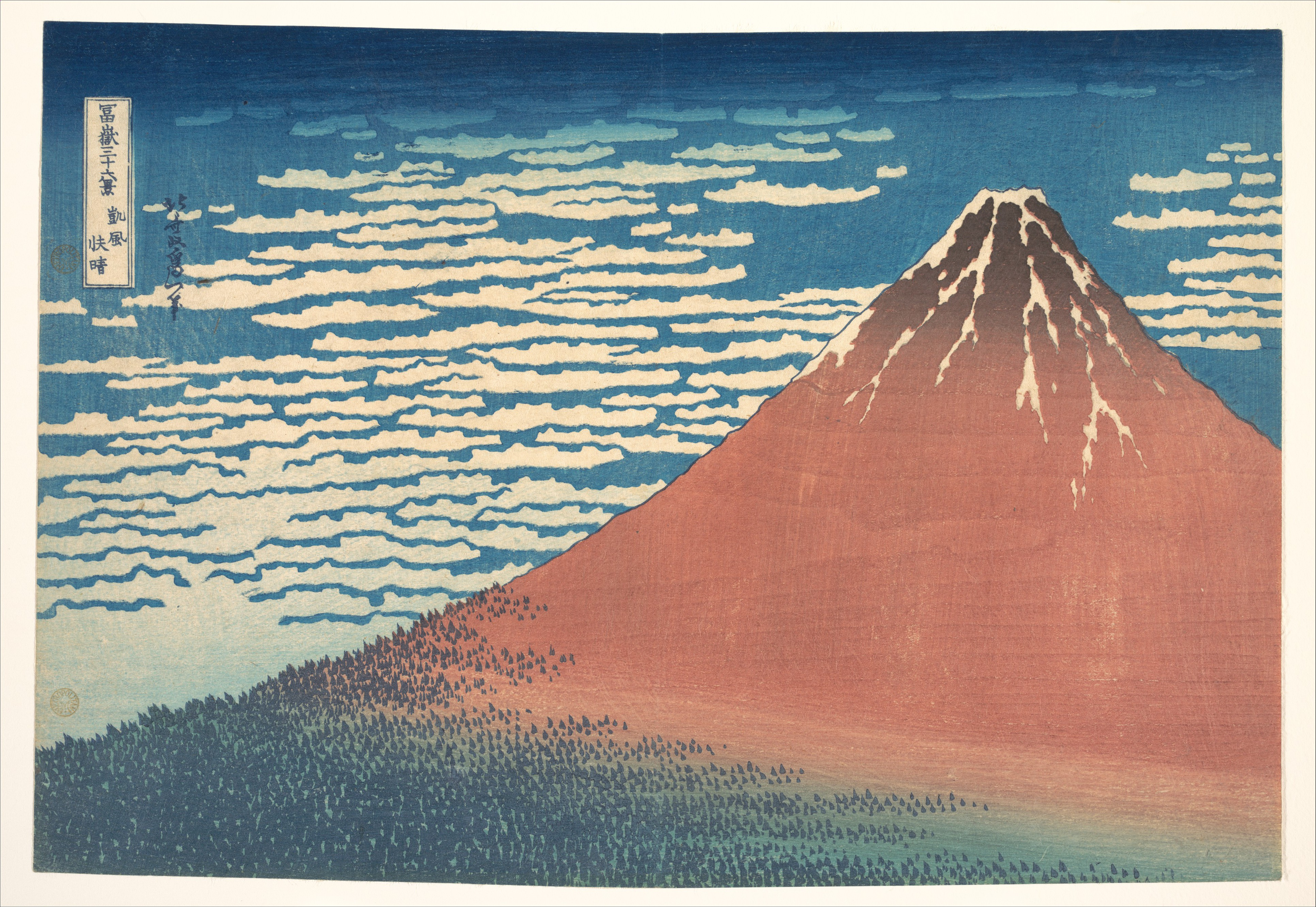
The print Red Fuji from Hokusai's series Thirty-six Views of Mount Fuji

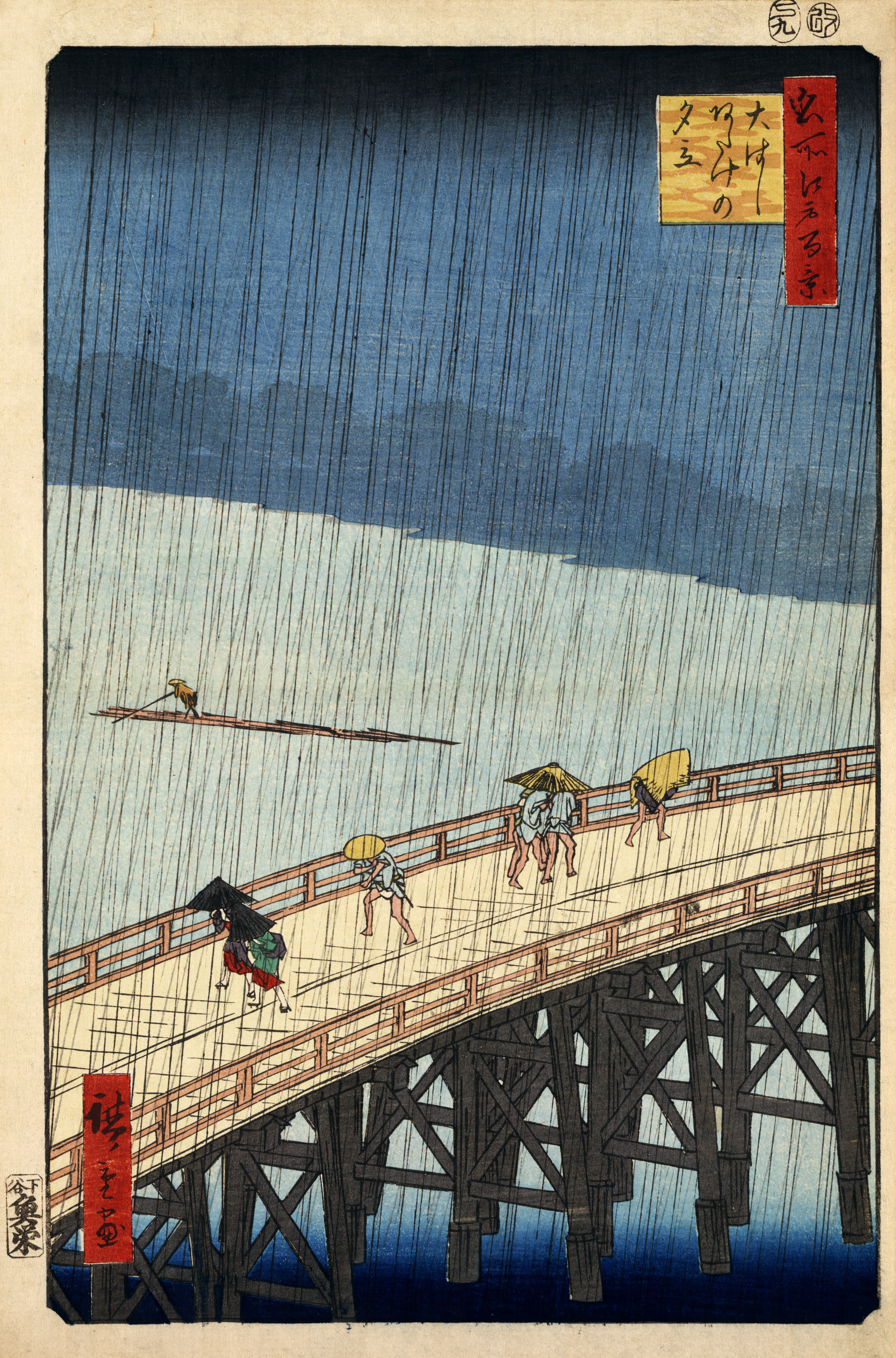
Sudden Shower at the Atake Bridge, Hiroshige, 1856

==== Ukiyo-e and nanga (bunjinga) ====
The school of art best known in the West is that of the ukiyo-e paintings and woodblock prints of the demimonde, the world of the kabuki theater and the pleasure districts. Ukiyo-e prints began to be produced in the late 17th century; in 1765 Harunobu produced the first polychrome print. Print designers of the next generation, including Torii Kiyonaga and Utamaro, created elegant and sometimes insightful depictions of courtesans.

In the 19th century the dominant figures were Hokusai and Hiroshige, the latter a creator of romantic and somewhat sentimental landscape prints. The odd angles and shapes through which Hiroshige often viewed landscape, and the work of Kiyonaga and Utamaro, with its emphasis on flat planes and strong linear outlines, had a profound impact on such Western artists as Edgar Degas and Vincent van Gogh. Via artworks held in Western museums, these same printmakers would later exert a powerful influence on the imagery and aesthetic approaches used by early Modernist poets such as Ezra Pound, Richard Aldington and H.D.

A school of painting contemporary with ukiyo-e was nanga, or bunjinga, a style based on paintings executed by Chinese scholar-painters. Just as ukiyo-e artists chose to depict figures from life outside the strictures of the Tokugawa shogunate, bunjin artists turned to Chinese culture. The exemplars of this style are Ike no Taiga, Yosa Buson, Tanomura Chikuden, and Yamamoto Baiitsu (ja:山本梅逸).

==== Ceramics ====
Traditional, mostly stoneware, styles continued in many parts of Japan, but Japanese ceramics were transformed around the start of the Edo period, by a large influx of Korean potters, captured or persuaded to emigrate in the course of the Japanese invasions of Korea in the 1590s. Many of these were settled on the southern island of Kyushu, and they brought with them experience of versions of the Chinese-style chambered climbing kiln, called noborigama in Japan, which allowed high temperatures with more precise control. By around 1620 they had discovered deposits of kaolinite, and started to make porcelain for the first time in Japan. The early wares (called "Early Imari") were relatively small and imitated the Chinese underglaze blue and white porcelain, which Japan had been importing for some time.

The porcelain industry greatly expanded in the late 1650s, as the collapse of the Chinese industry from civil war led to very large orders from the Chinese traders and the Dutch East India Company, by then the traders only permitted to do business in Japan. The first great period of Japanese export porcelain lasted until about the 1740s, and the great bulk of Japanese porcelain was made for export, mostly to Europe, but also the Islamic world to the west and south of Japan. Japanese pottery is among the finest in the world.

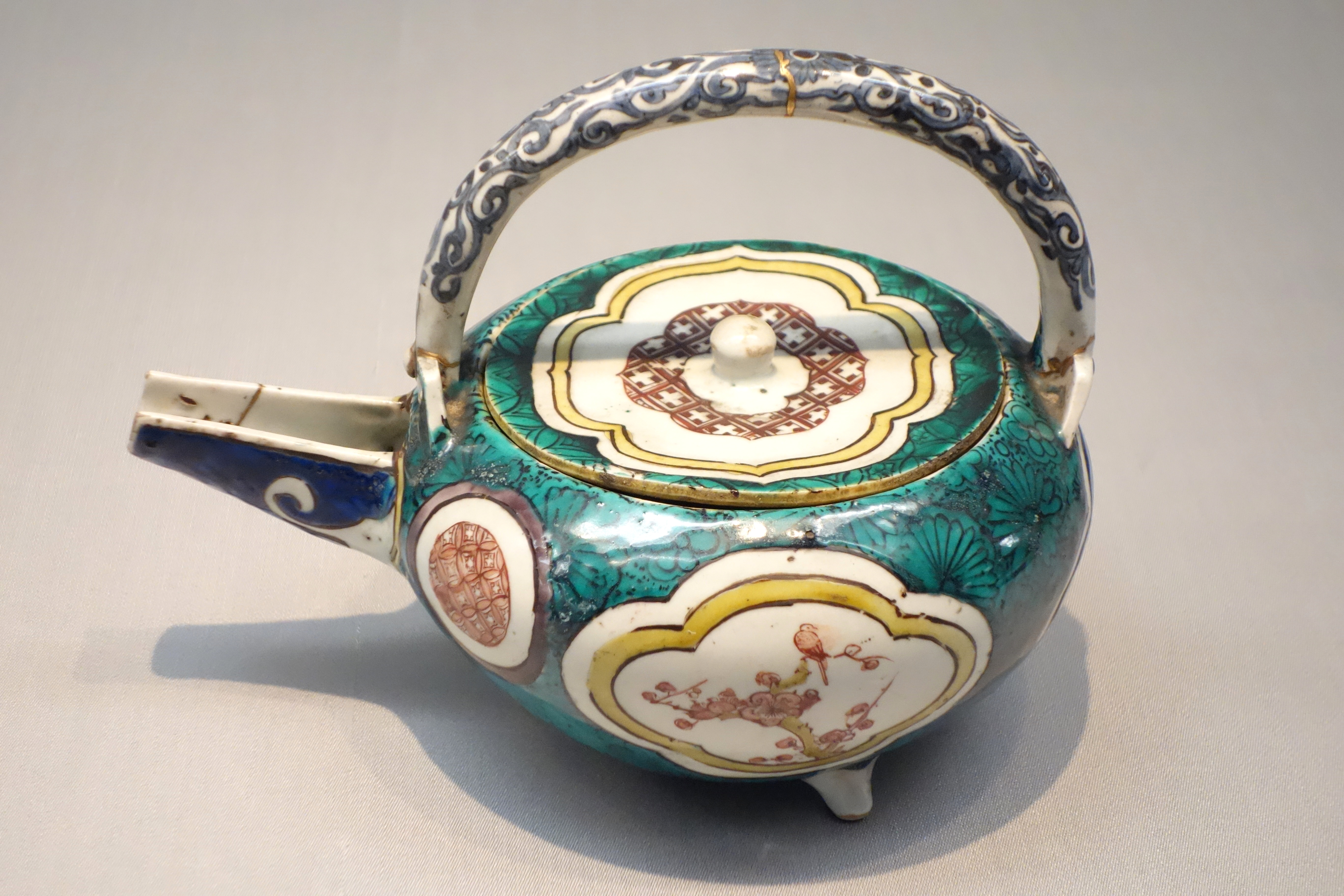
Ko-Kutani (old Kutani) five colours Iroe type sake ewer with bird and flower design in overglaze enamel, Edo period, 17th century

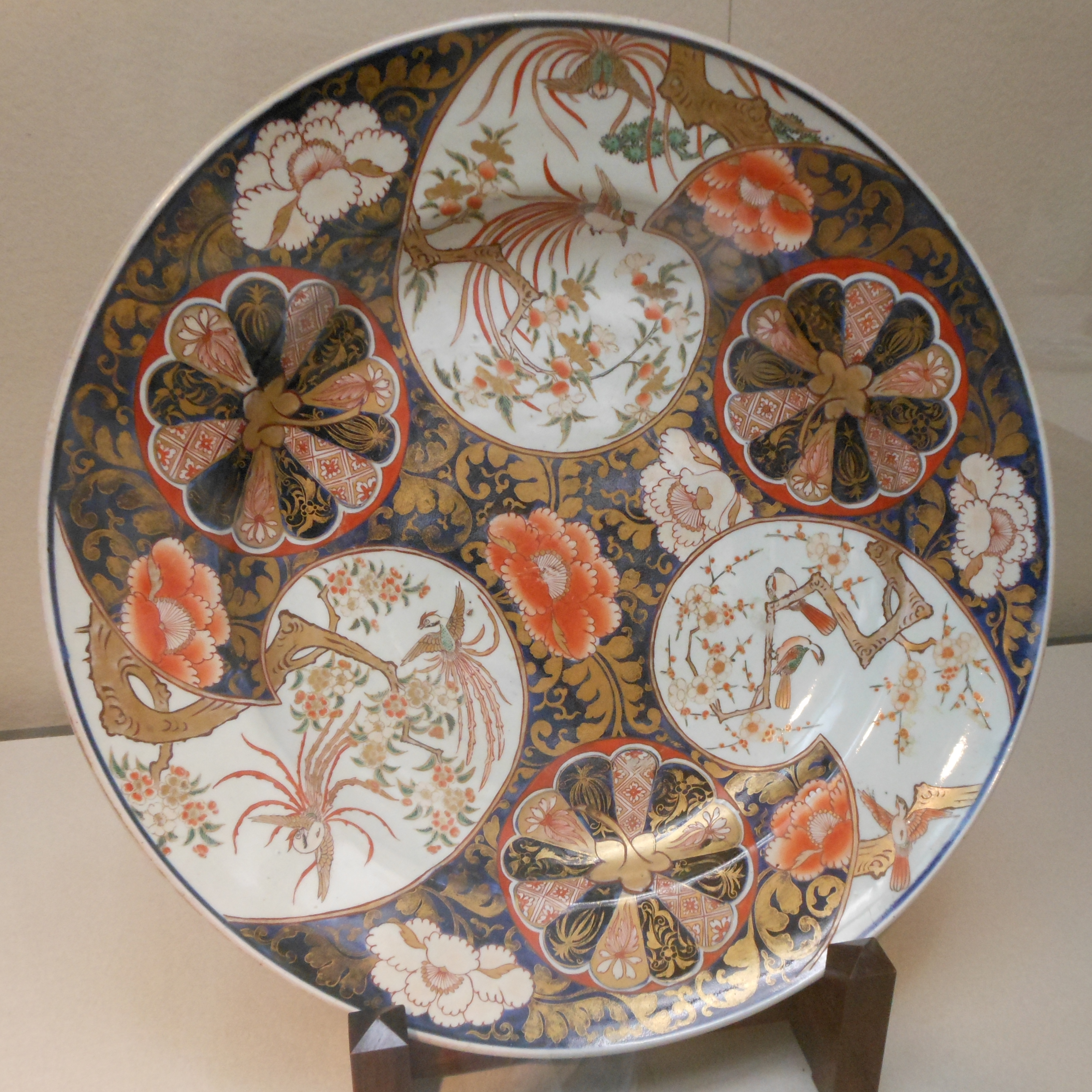
Ko-Imari dish, 1700–1740

==== Lacquerware ====
With the development of economy and culture, the artistic quality of lacquered furniture has improved. Hon'ami Kōetsu and Ogata Kōrin brought the designs of the Rinpa school of painting into lacquerware. From the middle of the Edo period, inrō for portable medicine containers began to be decorated gorgeously with maki-e and raden, and it became popular among samurai class and wealthy merchants in the chōnin class, and at the end of the Edo period, it changed from practical accessories to art collections. The export of lacquerware continued following the Azuchi-Momoyama period. Marie Antoinette and Maria Theresa are known as collectors of Japanese lacquerware in this period.

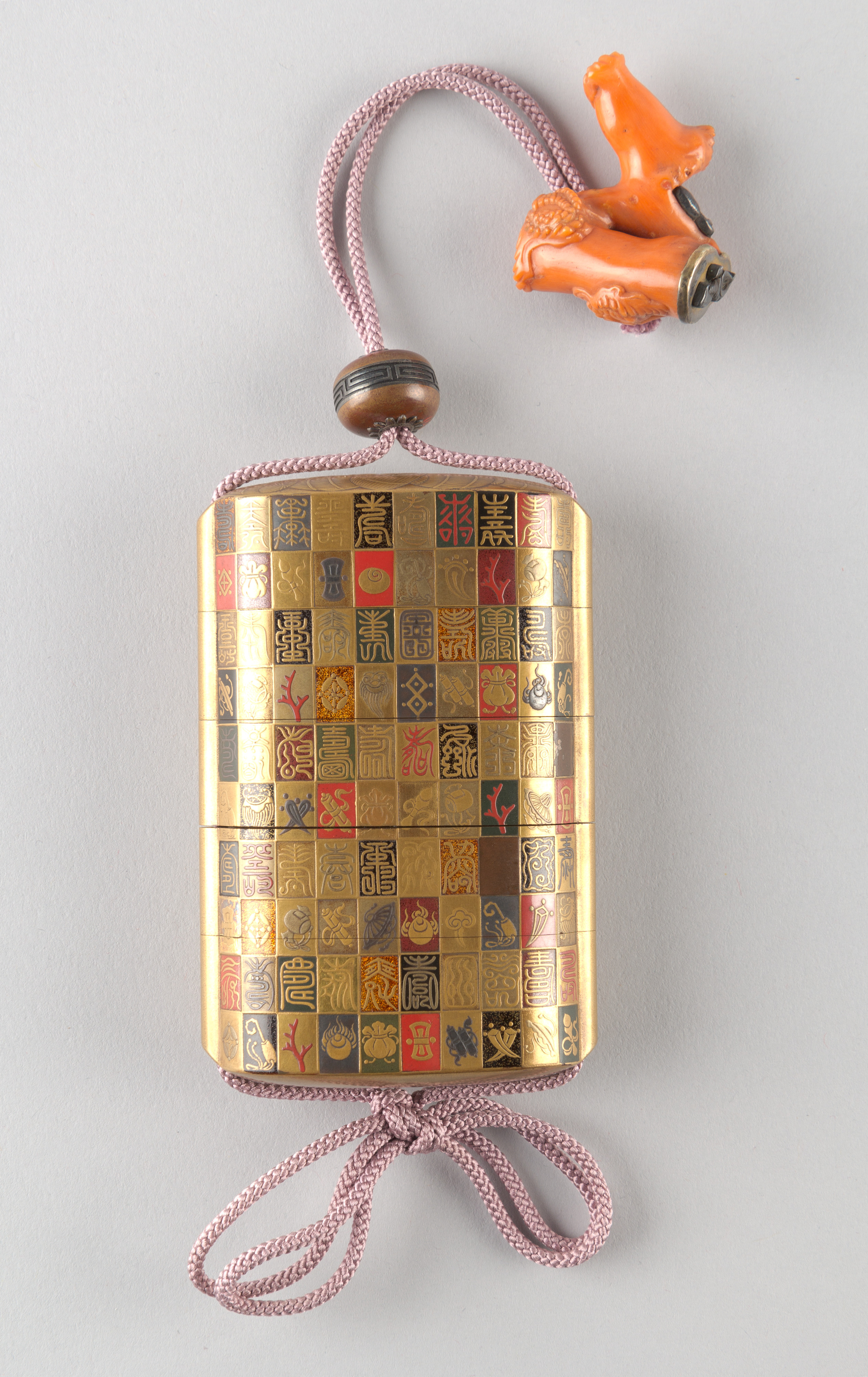
Inro and Netsuke, 18th century

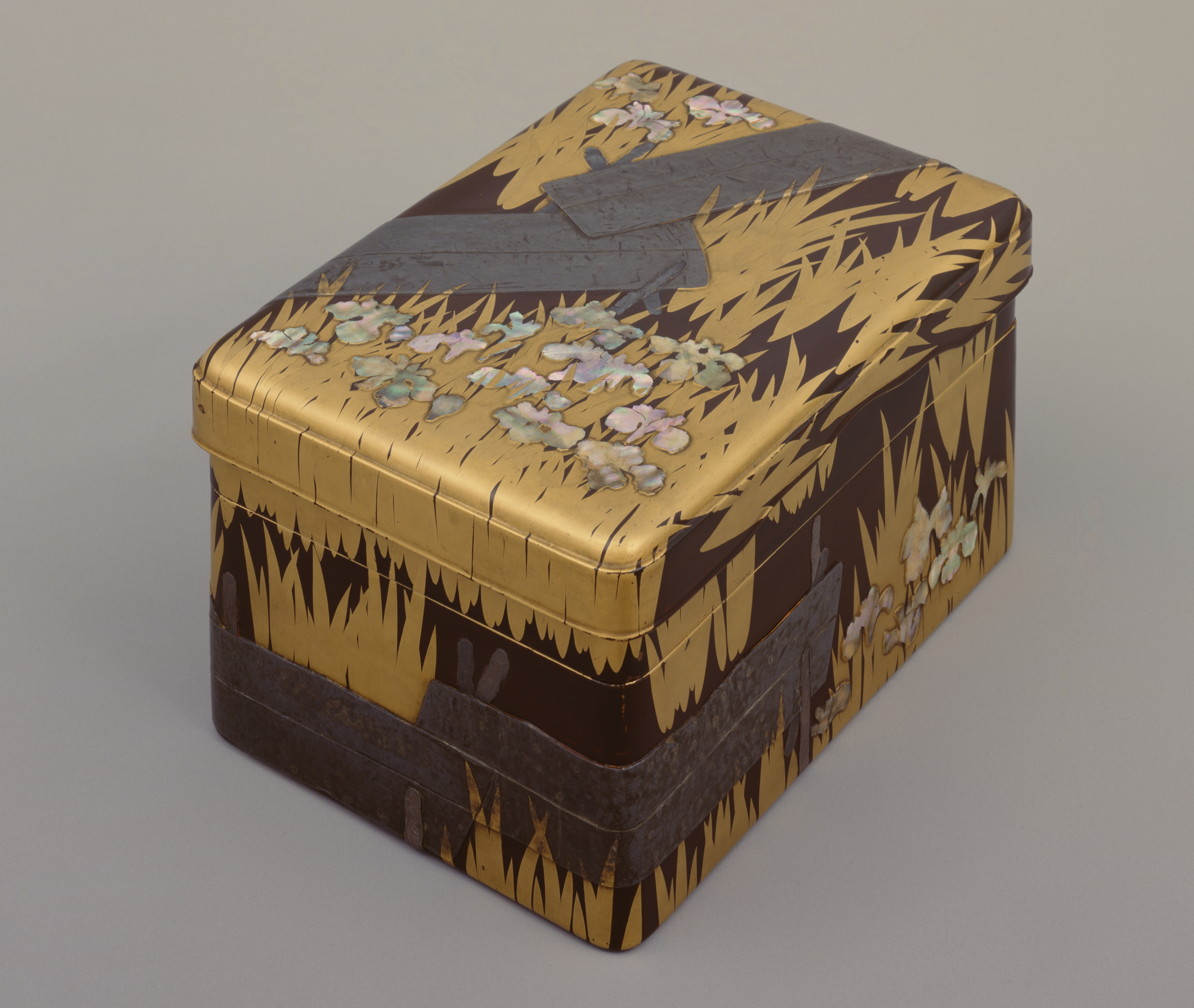
Writing lacquer box with Irises at Yatsuhashi, by Ogata Kōrin. National Treasure

=== Art of the pre-war period ===
When the Emperor of Japan regained ruling power in 1868, Japan was once again invaded by new and alien forms of culture. During the Prewar period, The introduction of Western cultural values led to a dichotomy in Japanese art, as well as in nearly every other aspect of culture, between traditional values and attempts to duplicate and assimilate a variety of clashing new ideas. This split remained evident in the late 20th century, although much synthesis had by then already occurred, and created an international cultural atmosphere and stimulated contemporary Japanese arts toward ever more innovative forms.

The government took an active interest in the art export market, promoting Japanese arts at a succession of world's fairs, beginning with the 1873 Vienna World's Fair. As well as heavily funding the fairs, the government took an active role organising how Japan's culture was presented to the world. It created a semi-public company — the Kiritsu Kosho Kaisha (First Industrial Manufacturing Company) — to promote and commercialize exports of art and established the Hakurankai Jimukyoku (Exhibition Bureau) to maintain quality standards. For the 1876 Centennial International Exhibition in Philadelphia, the Japanese government created a Centennial Office and sent a special envoy to secure space for the 30,000 items that would be displayed. The Imperial Household also took an active interest in arts and crafts, commissioning works ("presentation wares") as gifts for foreign dignitaries. In 1890, the Teishitsu Gigeiin (Artist to the Imperial Household) system was created to recognise distinguished artists; seventy were appointed from 1890 to 1944. Among these were the painter and lacquer artist Shibata Zeshin, ceramicist Makuzu Kōzan, painter Hashimoto Gahō, and cloisonné enamel artist Namikawa Yasuyuki.

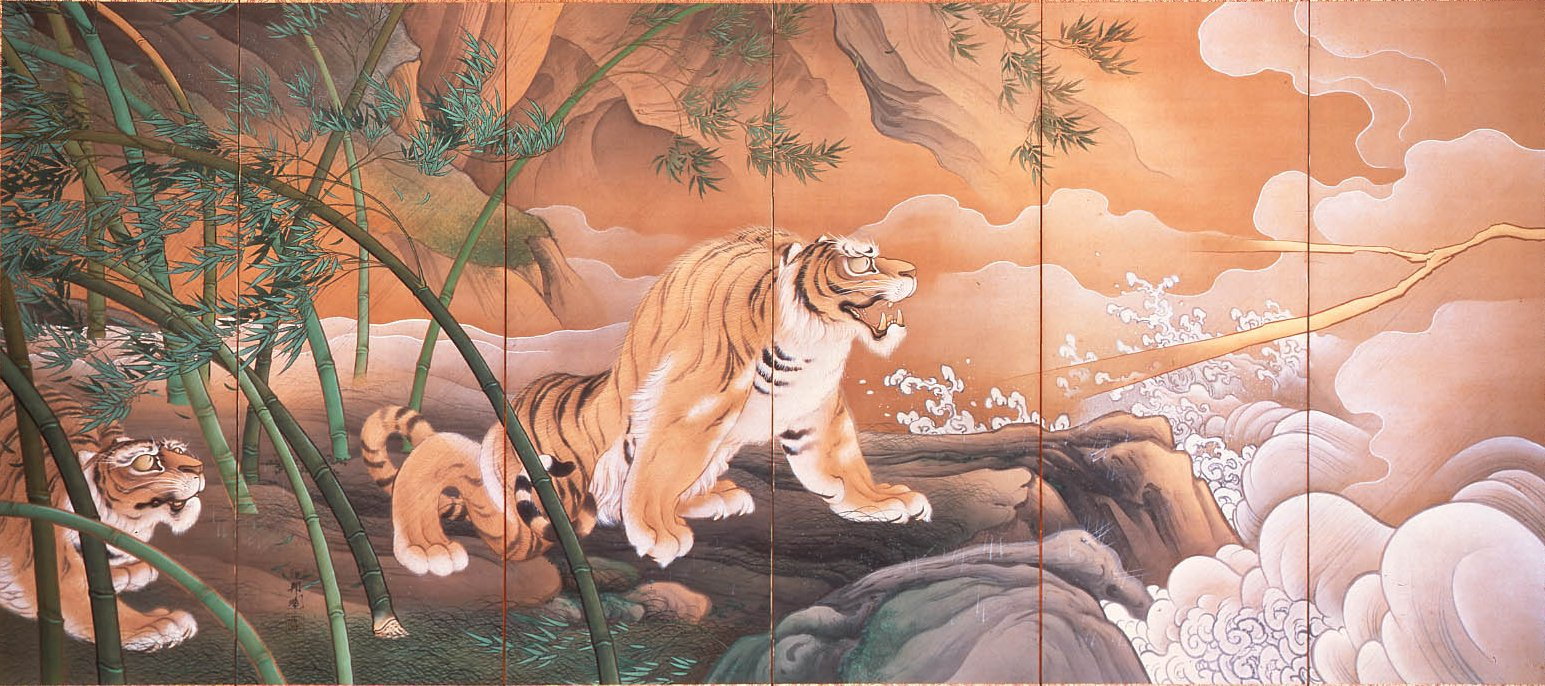
Byōbu Dragon and tiger (竜虎図) left side, 1895, by Hashimoto Gahō

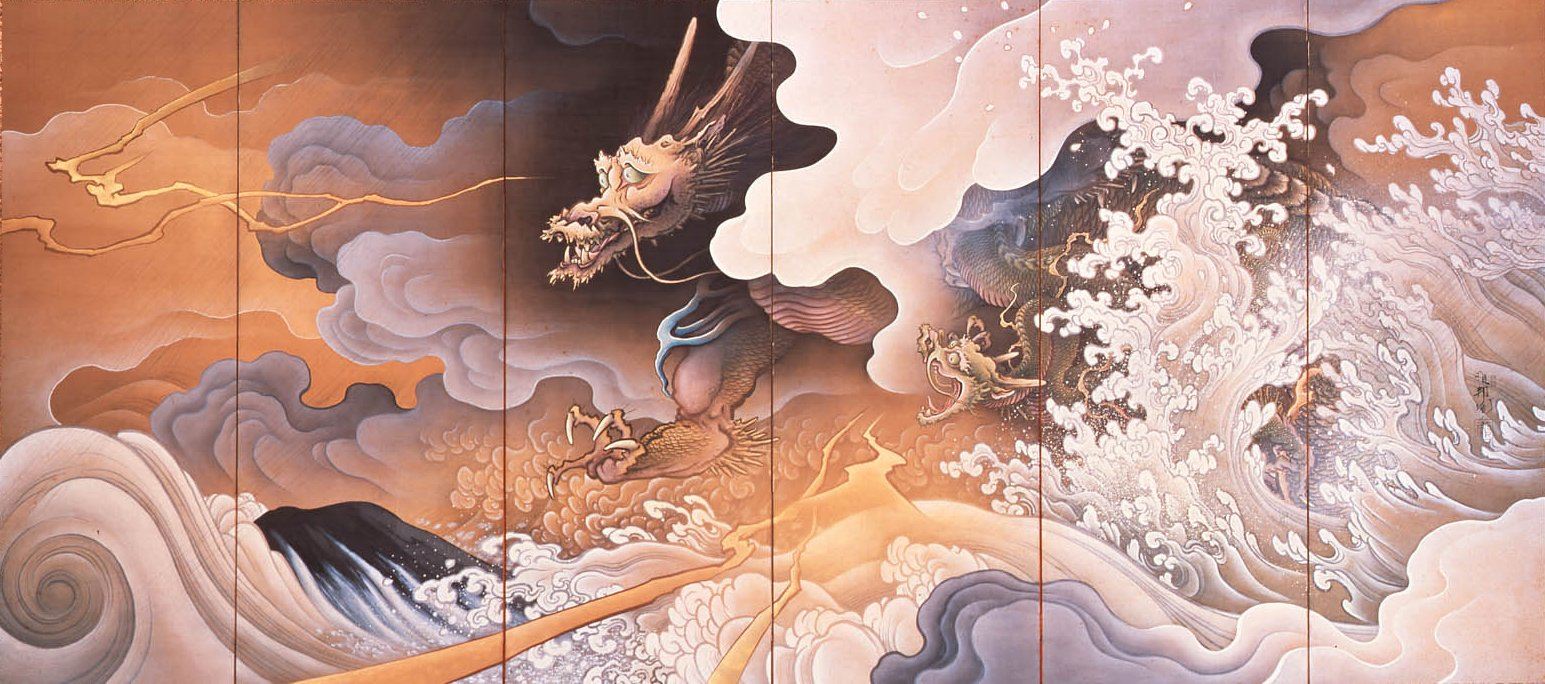
Byōbu Dragon and tiger right side, 1895, by Hashimoto Gahō

As Western imports became popular, demand for Japanese art declined within Japan itself. In Europe and America, the new availability of Japanese art led to a fascination for Japanese culture; a craze known in Europe as Japonisme. Imperial patronage, government sponsorship, promotion to new audiences, and Western technology combined to foster an era of Japanese artistic innovation. In the decorative arts, Japanese artists reached new levels of technical sophistication.

Today, Masayuki Murata owns more than 10,000 Meiji art works and is one of the most enthusiastic collectors. From that time, most of the excellent works of Meiji Art were bought by foreign collectors and only a few of them remained in Japan, but because he bought back many works from foreign countries and opened the Kiyomizu Sannenzaka Museum, the study and reevaluation of Meiji Art rapidly advanced in Japan from the 21st century. Nasser Khalili is also one of the world's most dedicated collectors of Meiji art, and his collection encompasses many categories of Meiji art. The Japanese Imperial Family also owns excellent works of Meiji Art, some of which were donated to the state and are now stored in the Museum of the Imperial Collections.

==== Architecture and garden ====
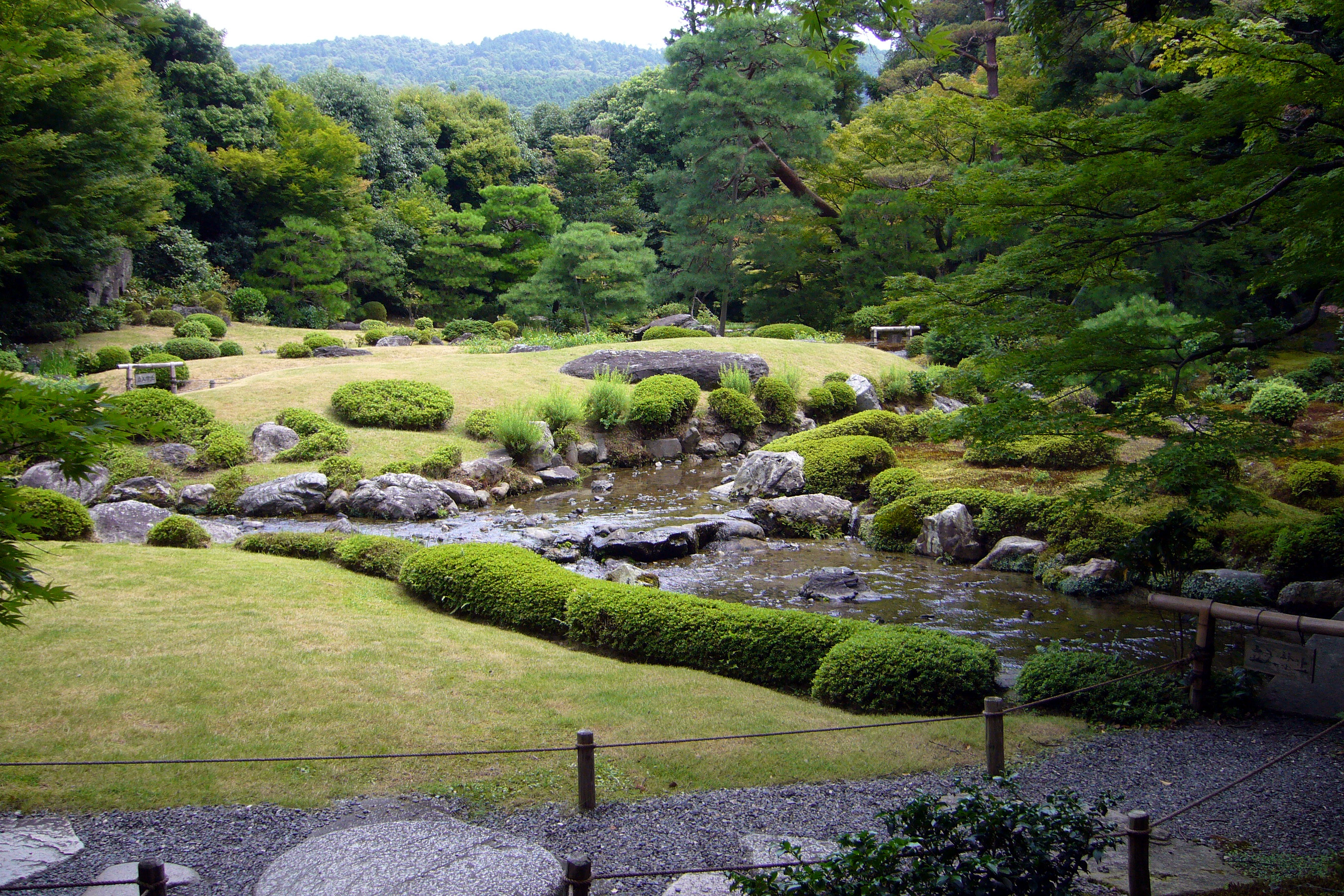
Garden of Murin-an, designed by Jihei Ogawa in 1894–1898

By the early 20th century, European art forms were well introduced and their marriage produced notable buildings like the Tokyo Train Station and the National Diet Building that still exist today. Tokyo Station, a building of Giyōfū architecture, full of bricks and pseudo-European style. This style of building was built in urban areas.

Many artistic new Japanese gardens were built by Jihei Ogawa.

==== Painting ====
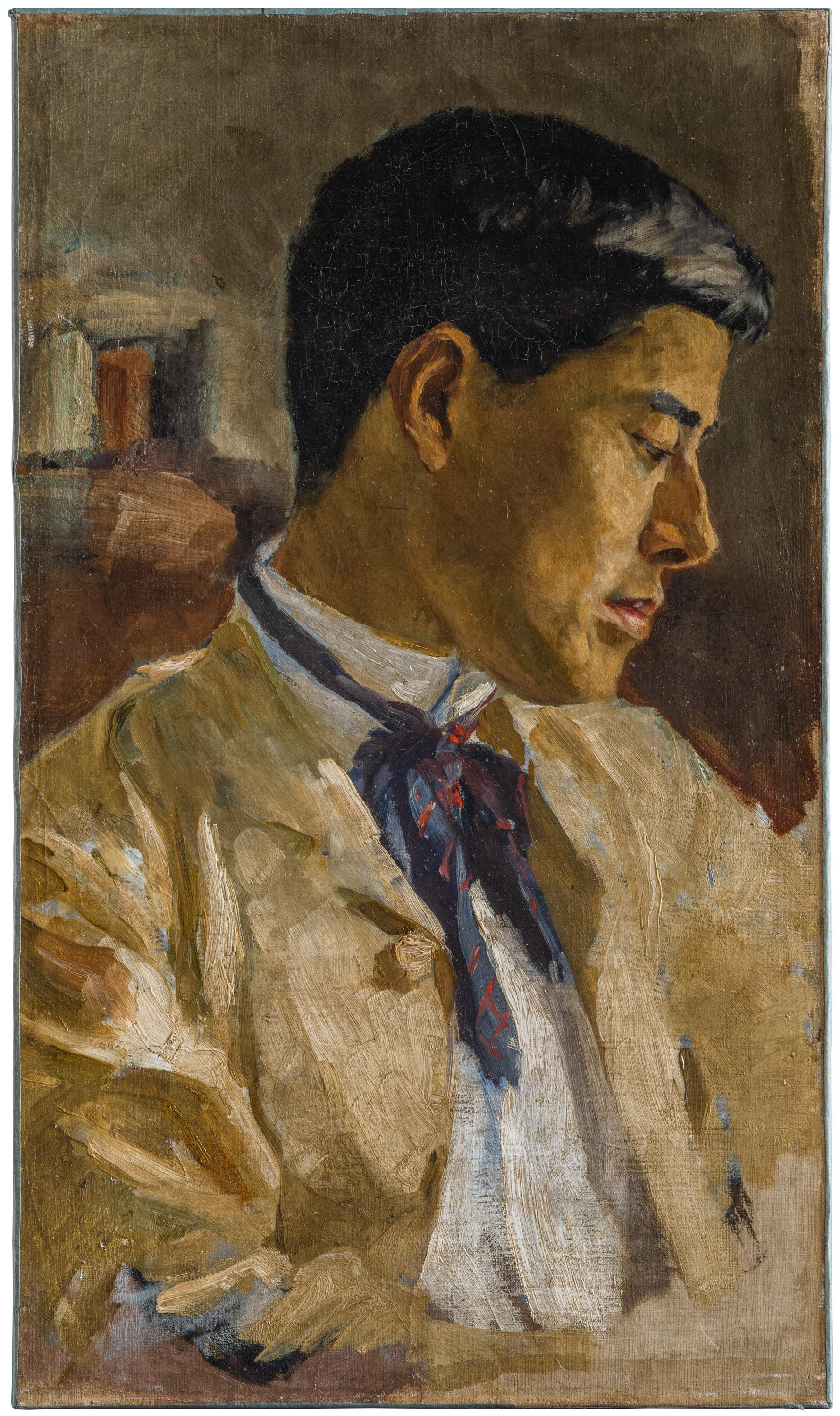
Mr Kume [Kume Keiichiro], by Kuroda Seiki, Kuroda Kinenkan

The first response of the Japanese to Western art forms was open-hearted acceptance, and in 1876 the Technological Art School (ja:工部美術学校) was opened, employing Italian instructors to teach Western methods. The second response was a pendulum swing in the opposite direction spearheaded by Okakura Kakuzō and the American Ernest Fenollosa, who encouraged Japanese artists to retain traditional themes and techniques while creating works more in keeping with contemporary taste. This was a strategy that eventually served to extend the influence of Japanese art as far as Calcutta, London, and Boston in the years leading up to World War I. Out of these two poles of artistic theory—derived from Europe and from East Asia respectively—developed yōga ("Western-style painting") and Nihonga ("Japanese painting"), categories that have maintained currency.

==== Enamels ====
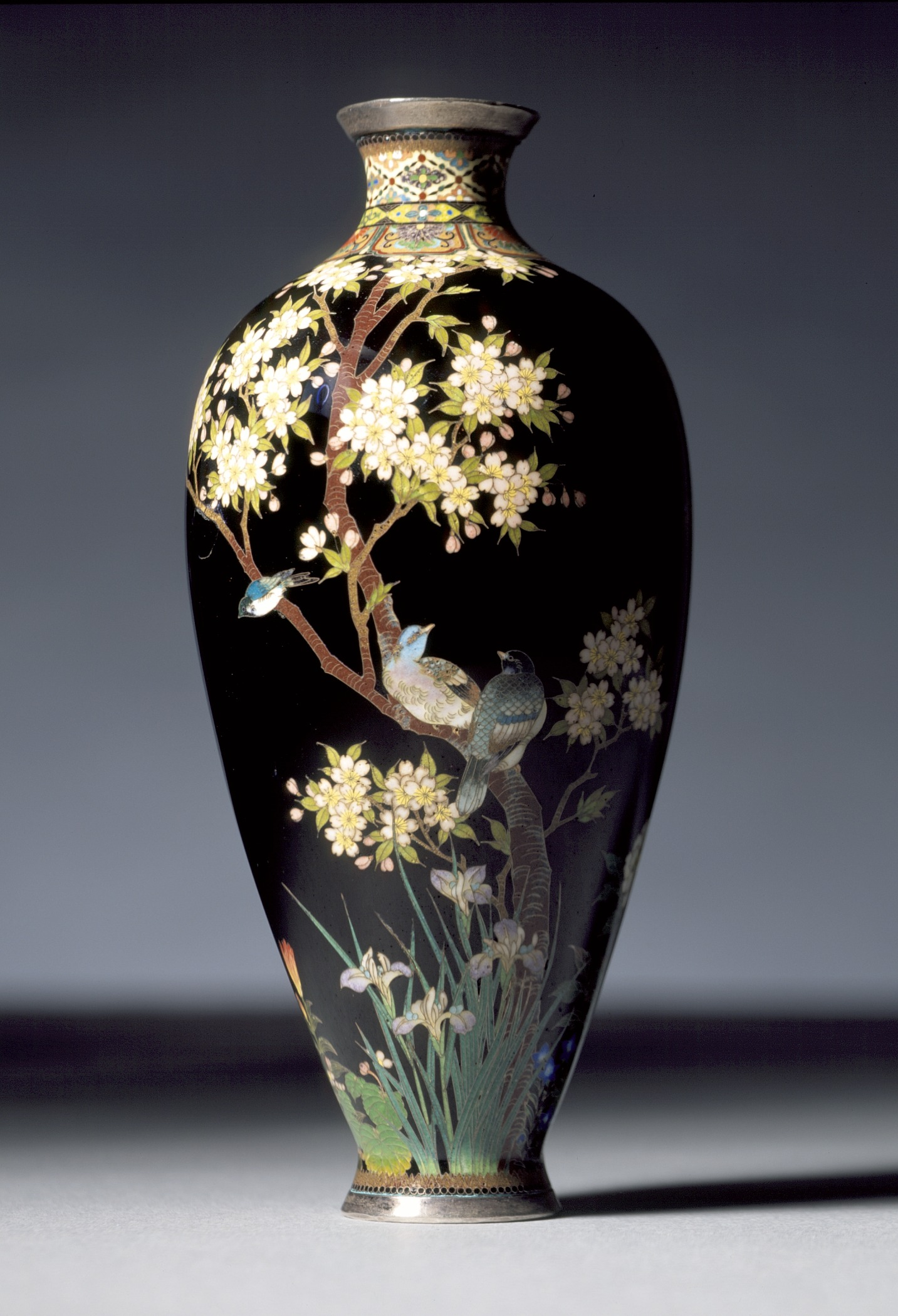
Flower and bird pattern vase by Namikawa Yasuyuki

During the Meiji era, Japanese cloisonné enamel reached a technical peak, producing items more advanced than any that had existed before. The period from 1890 to 1910 was known as the "Golden age" of Japanese enamels. Artists experimented with pastes and with the firing process to produce ever larger blocks of enamel, with less need for cloisons (enclosing metal strips). Thus enamels became a more pictorial medium, with designs similar to, or copied from, traditional paintings. Enamels with a design unique to Japan, in which flowers, birds and insects were used as themes, became popular. In particular, the works of Namikawa Yasuyuki and Namikawa Sōsuke were exhibited at world's fairs and won many awards. Along with the two Namikawa, the Ando Cloisonné Company has produced many high-quality cloisonne. Japanese enamels were regarded as unequalled thanks to the new achievements in design and colouring.

==== Lacquerware ====
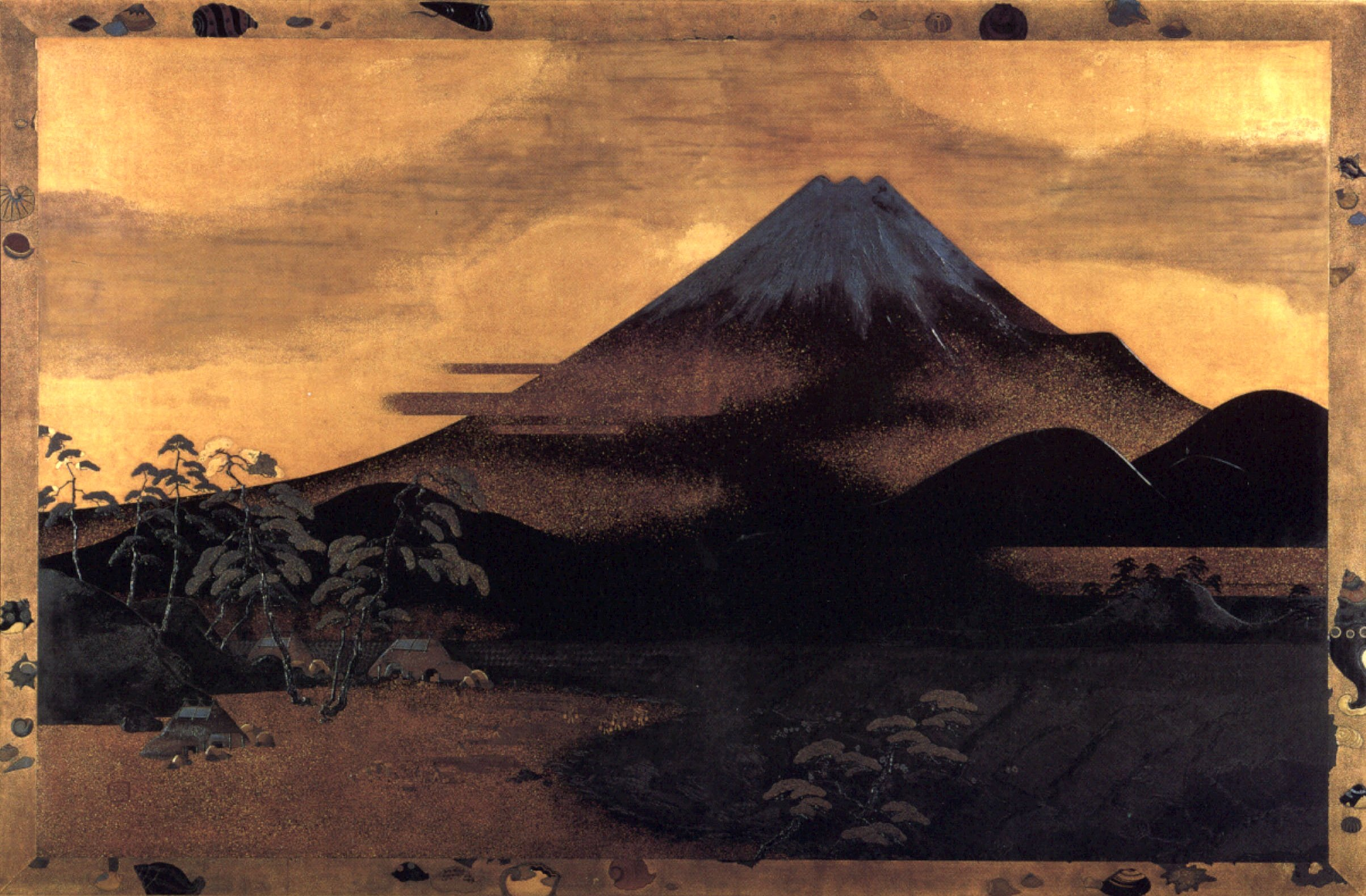
Maki-e Fuji Tagonoura, Shibata Zeshin, 1872

The Meiji era saw a renewed interest in lacquer as artists developed new designs and experimented with new textures and finishes. Maki-e (decorating the lacquer in gold or silver dust) was the most common technique for quality lacquerware in this period. Shibata Zeshin was a lacquerer who gained a high reputation for his works from the Bakumatsu to the Meiji period. Lacquerware called Shibayama and Somada, created in the Edo period, became popular for its showy style, inlaid with gold, silver, shellfish, ivory, and colorful metal and glass, and reached its peak during this period. Lacquer from Japanese workshops was recognised as technically superior to what could be produced anywhere else in the world.

==== Metalwork ====
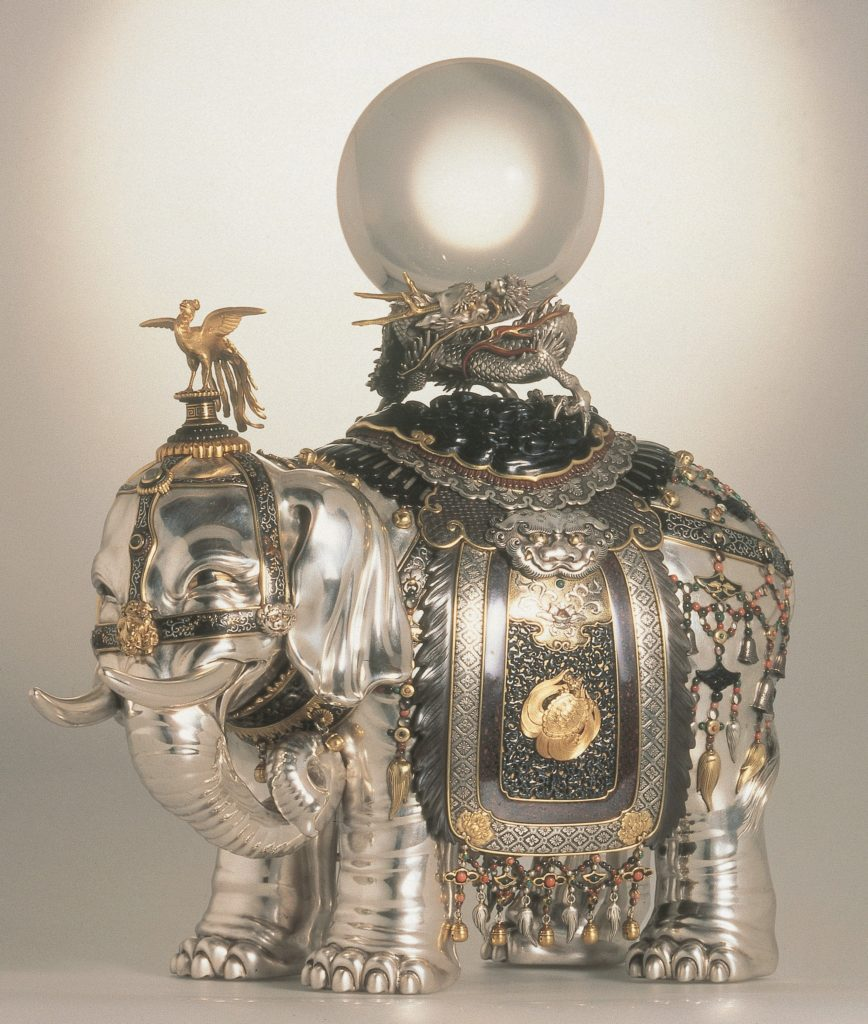
Koro, silver decorated with precious metals and rock crystal, 1890

At the start of the Meiji era, Japanese metalwork was almost totally unknown outside the country, unlike lacquer and porcelain which had previously been exported. Metalwork was connected to Buddhist practice, for example in the use of bronze for temple bells and incense cauldrons, so there were fewer opportunities for metalworkers once Buddhism was displaced as the state religion. International exhibitions brought Japanese cast bronze to a new foreign audience, attracting strong praise. The past history of samurai weaponry equipped Japanese metalworkers to create metallic finishes in a wide range of colours. By combining and finishing copper, silver and gold in different proportions, they created specialised alloys including shakudō and shibuichi. With this variety of alloys and finishes, an artist could give the impression of full-colour decoration.

==== Ivory carving ====
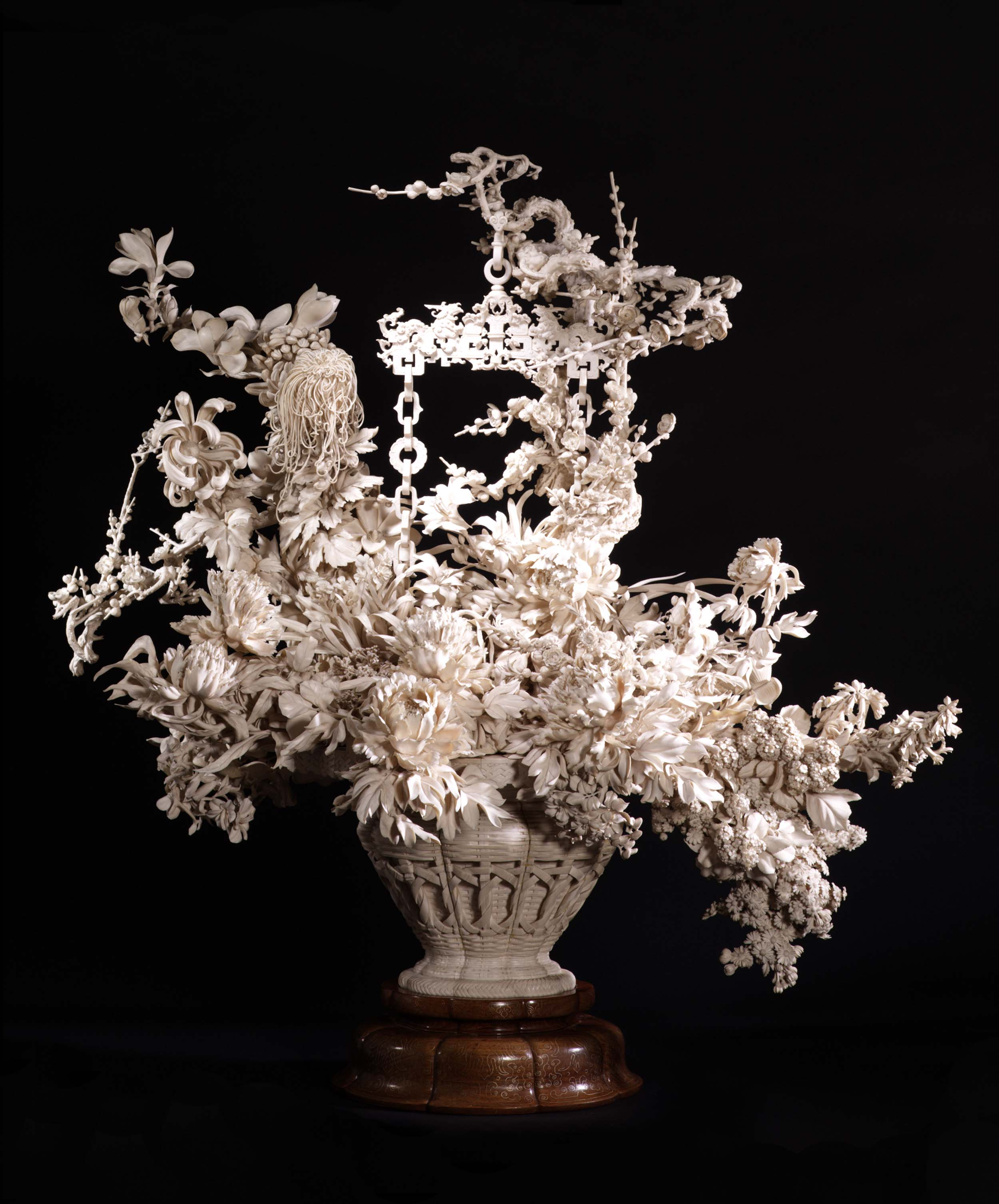
Basket of Flowers. circa 1900, Meiji period. Khalili Collection of Japanese Art.

In the Meiji period, Japanese clothes began to be westernized and the number of people who wore kimono decreased, so the craftsmen who made netsuke and kiseru with ivory and wood lost their demand. Therefore, they tried to create a new field, ivory sculptures for interior decoration, and many elaborate works were exported to foreign countries or purchased by the Imperial Family. In particular, the works of Ishikawa Komei and Asahi Gyokuzan won praise in Japan.

==== Porcelain and earthenware ====
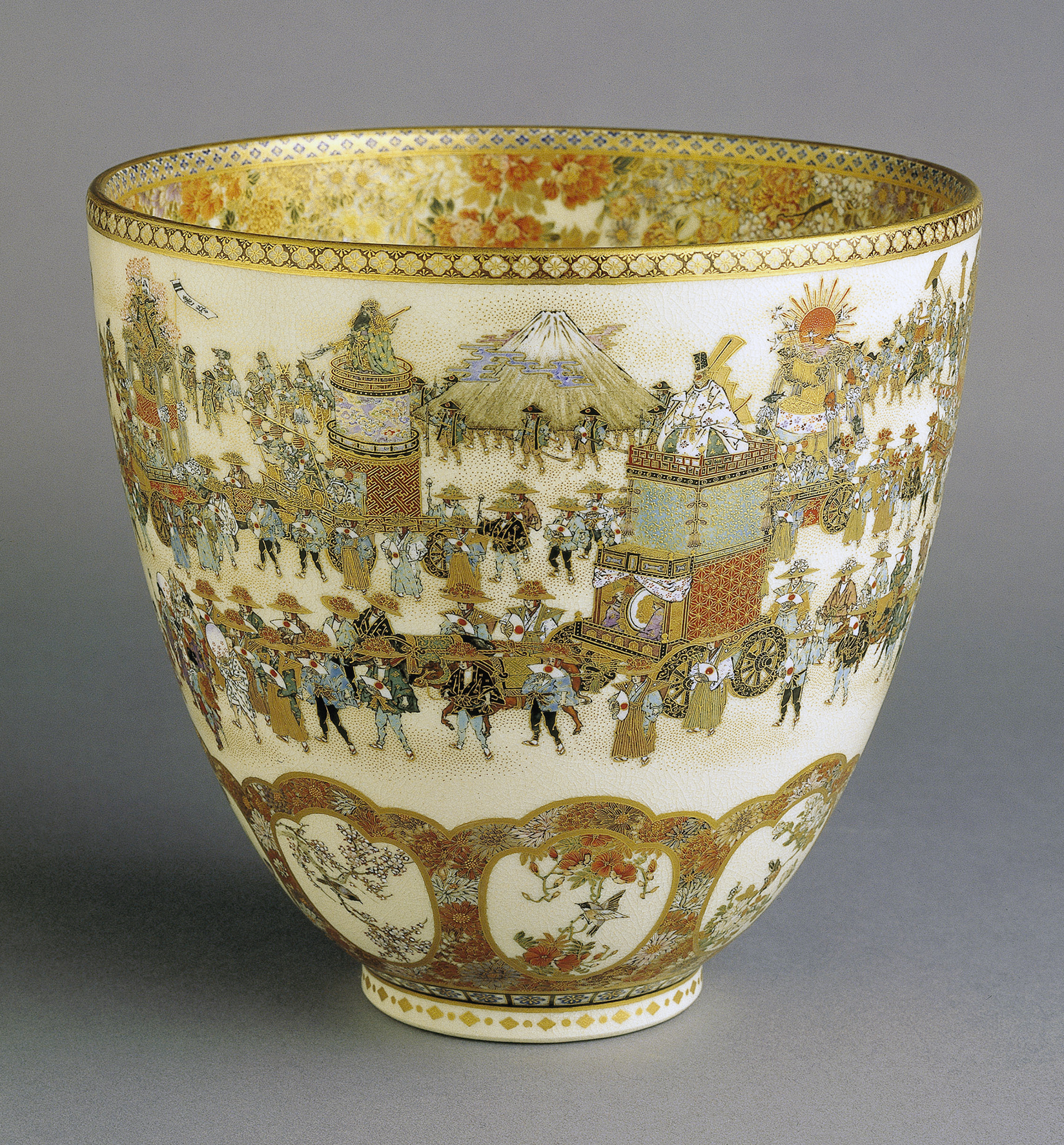
Earthenware bowl by Yabu Meizan, circa 1910

Technical and artistic innovations of the Meiji era turned porcelain into one of the most internationally successful Japanese decorative art forms. Satsuma ware was a name originally given to pottery from Satsuma province, elaborately decorated with gilt and enamel. These wares were highly praised in the West. Seen in the West as distinctively Japanese, this style actually owed a lot to imported pigments and Western influences, and had been created with export in mind. Workshops in many cities raced to produce this style to satisfy demand from Europe and America, often producing quickly and cheaply. So the term "Satsuma ware" came to be associated not with a place of origin but with lower-quality ware created purely for export. Despite this, artists such as Yabu Meizan and Makuzu Kōzan maintained the highest artistic standards while also successfully exporting. From 1876 to 1913, Kōzan won prizes at 51 exhibitions, including the World's fair and the National Industrial Exhibition.

==== Textiles ====
A composite imaginary view of Japan: silk textile artwork

The 1902 edition of Encyclopædia Britannica wrote, "In no branch of applied art does the decorative genius of Japan show more attractive results than that of textile fabrics, and in none has there been more conspicuous progress during recent years." Very large, colourful pictorial works were being produced in Kyoto. Embroidery had become an art form in its own right, adopting a range of pictorial techniques such as chiaroscuro and aerial perspective.

=== Art of the postwar period ===
Immediately following Japan's defeat in World War II in 1945, large numbers of Japanese artists fell under the influence of, or even joined, the Japan Communist Party, which had just been legalized by the U.S.-led military occupation of Japan after many years of suppression by the prewar and wartime Japanese police. This had to do with the success of the Communist Party had in peddling the notion in the early postwar years that the party had been the only group in Japan to have resisted wartime militarism. In addition, the Japanese word for "vanguard" (前衛, zen'ei), as in "vanguard of the communist revolution," happens to be the same word used for "avant-garde" as in the artistic avant-garde. The Japan Communist Party soon came to dominate the major art societies and exhibitions in Japan, and thus the predominant form of art in the immediate aftermath of the war was socialist realism that depicted the suffering of the poor and the nobility of the working class, in line with Communist Party doctrine that all art should serve the purpose of advancing the cause of revolution. In 1952, the Communist Party even ordered artists such as Hiroshi Katsuragawa and other members of the newly formed Avant-Garde Art Association (前衛美術会, Zen'ei Bijutsukai) out into the mountains to produce socialist realist art in support of "mountain guerrilla squads" that were attempting to foment a violent revolution in Japan.

==== 1950s: Struggling to break free of socialist realism ====
Over the course of the 1950s, many Japanese artists became increasingly disillusioned with the rigid and limited definition of "art" enforced by the Communist Party. However, due to the ongoing preeminence of Communist Party members and supporters in the senior ranks of artistic societies and exhibition juries, artists found it extremely difficult to even show their art unless they conformed to the Party's guidelines. Some artists shied away from formal public exhibitions. Others sought recognition, financial support, and opportunities to show their art overseas, such as the Gutai group of conceptual artists, founded in 1954. Still other artists made use of the few unjuried, "independent" exhibitions in Japan, such as the Yomiuri Indépendant Exhibition sponsored by the Yomiuri Shimbun, which anyone could enter.

A final straw came with the massive 1960 Anpo Protests against the U.S.-Japan Security Treaty (known as "Anpo" in Japanese"), due to the extremely passive role played by the supposedly "vanguard" Communist Party. When the protests failed to stop the treaty, a round of recriminations led to further disillusionment with the Communist Party and socialist realist art, causing many more artists to break away from the Party's influence.

==== 1960s: Exploration of new genres ====
With the dominance of socialist realism fading, the 1960s witnessed an explosion of new art forms in Japan, as the arts expanded in new directions that might best be termed "postmodern." Artist collectives such as Neo-Dada Organizers, Zero Dimension, and Hi-Red Center explored concepts such as "non-art" and "anti-art," and conducted a variety of audacious "events," "happenings," and other forms of performance art designed to erode the boundaries between art and daily life. The Mono-ha group similarly pushed the boundaries dividing art, space, landscape, and the environment. Other artists, such as graphic designer Tadanori Yokoo, drew inspiration from 1960s counterculture and the explosion of new forms of adult-oriented manga comics. In the performing arts, Tatsumi Hijikata pioneered a new form of postmodern dance called Butoh, and playwrights such as Jūrō Kara and Satō Makoto created the Angura style of radical "underground" theater. And in photography, photographers such as Daidō Moriyama pioneered an extremely influential new school of postwar photography that emphasized spontaneity over carefully staged composition and celebrated the characteristics "are, bure, bokeh" (literally "rough, blurred, out-of-focus").

The proliferation of new types of art was supported by the tremendous growth of Japan's economy in the 1960s, remembered as the "Japanese economic miracle." Over the course of the 1960s, the Japanese economy grew by over 10% per year. Rising wealth created a new class of consumers who could afford to spend money on art and support different types of art and artists. For the first time in Japan's modern history, it became viable for significant numbers of artists to make a living purely through selling their art. The 1960s construction boom in Japan, which leveled the old wood-and-paper traditional Japanese architecture and replaced it with sparkling mega-cities of glass and steel, helped inspire brand new schools of Japanese architecture, such as the Metabolism movement led by Kenzō Tange, that boldly broke free from conventional models and proved influential around the world.

At the same time, however, the art world remained dominated by cliques that promoted the works of certain (usually male) artists over others. As it became much easier for Japanese to travel overseas in the 1960s, some female artists such as Yayoi Kusama and Yoko Ono found better reception overseas, and decamped for artistic centers such as London, Paris, and New York, as did many male artists as well.

The triumph of the new forms of Japanese art was cemented at the 1970 Osaka World's Fair, where dozens of avant-garde and conceptual artists were hired to design pavilions and artistic experiences for fair-goers. Japanese avant-garde art had gone global, and had become something even the conservative government was proud to display to the world.

==== 1970s and 1980s: Riding the economic bubble ====
The 1970s and 1980s saw Japanese art continue in many of the directions begun in the 1950s and 1960s, but often with much bigger budgets and more expensive materials, as Japan's economy kept rapidly expanding, and eventually grew into one of the largest economic bubbles in history. With Japanese currency becoming incredibly strong in the wake of the 1985 Plaza Accord, Japanese individuals and institutions became major players in the international art market. Extraordinarily wealthy Japanese mega-corporations began constructing their own private art museums and acquiring collections of modern and contemporary art, and Japanese artists greatly benefited from these expenditures as well.

In particular, artistic production continued to trend away from traditional painting and sculpture in the direction of graphic design, pop art, wearable art, performance art, conceptual art, and installation art. Various types of "hybrid" art increasingly came into vogue. As technology advanced, artists increasingly incorporated electronics, video, computers, synthesized music and sounds, and video games into their art. The aesthetics of manga and anime, which so many younger artists had grown up immersed in, exerted an increasing if sometimes quite subtle influence. Above all, artists eschewed anything redolent of "high art" or "fine art" in favor of the personal, the eclectic, the fantastic or phantasmagoric, and the playful. In edition, female artists such as Mika Yoshizawa became more and more accepted and supported by the art world in Japan.

==== Contemporary art in Japan ====
Japanese contemporary art takes as many forms and expresses as different ideas as worldwide contemporary art in general. It ranges from advertisements, anime, video games, and architecture as already mentioned, to sculpture, painting, and drawing in all their various forms. Japanese artists have contributed to global contemporary art in the fields of architecture, video games, graphic design, fashion, and animation. While anime at first were derived primarily from manga stories, anime is diverse today, and many artists and studios have become well known as artists; Hayao Miyazaki and the artists and animators of Studio Ghibli are examples of this.

At the same time, many Japanese artists continue to use traditional Japanese artistic techniques and materials inherited from premodern times, such as traditional forms of Japanese paper and ceramics and painting with black and color ink on paper or silk. Some of these artworks depict traditional subject matters in traditional styles, while others explore new and different motifs and styles, or create hybrids of traditional and contemporary art forms, while using traditional media or materials. Still others eschew native media and styles, embracing Western oil paints or any number of other forms.

In sculpture, the same holds true; some artists stick to the traditional modes, some doing it with a modern flair, and some choose Western or brand new modes, styles, and media. Yo Akiyama is just one of many modern Japanese sculptors. He works primarily in clay pottery and ceramics, creating works that are very simple and straightforward, looking like they were created out of the earth itself. Another sculptor, using iron and other modern materials, built a large modern art sculpture in the Israeli port city of Haifa, called Hanabi (Fireworks). Nahoko Kojima is a contemporary Kirie artist who has pioneered the technique of Paper Cut Sculpture which hangs in 3D.

Takashi Murakami is arguably one of the most well-known Japanese modern artists in the Western world. Murakami and the other artists in his studio create pieces in a style, inspired by anime, which he has dubbed "superflat". His pieces take a multitude of forms, from painting to sculpture, some in increased size. But most, if not all, show clearly some anime influence, utilizing bright colors and simplified details.

Yayoi Kusama, Yoshitomo Nara, Hiroshi Sugimoto, Chiharu Shiota, Daidō Moriyama, Mariko Mori, Aya Takano, and Tabaimo are considered significant artists in the field of contemporary Japanese art. The Group 1965, an artists' collective, counts contemporary artist Makoto Aida among its members.

== Performing arts ==
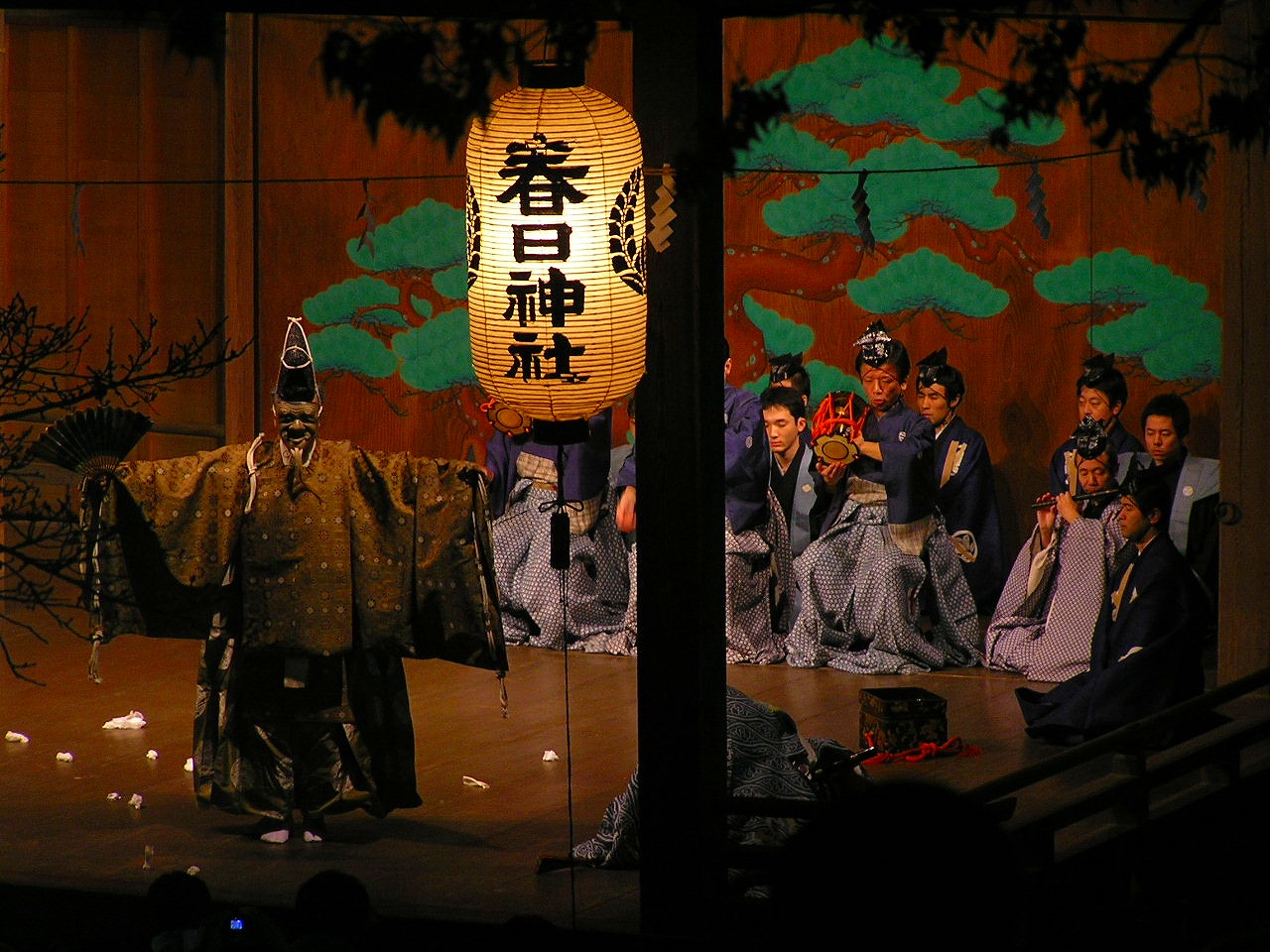
Noh is a stylized dance drama that originated in the 14th century. Performers wear various masks and play the roles of kami, onryō (vengeful spirits), and historical and legendary figures.

Many traditional forms of Japanese music, dance, and theater have survived in the contemporary world, enjoying some popularity through reidentification with Japanese cultural values. Traditional music and dance, which trace their origins to ancient religious use—Buddhist, Shintō, and folk—have been preserved in the dramatic performances of Noh, kabuki, and bunraku theater. Ancient court music and dance forms deriving from continental sources were preserved through Imperial household musicians and temple and shrine troupes. Some of the oldest musical instruments in the world have been in continuous use in Japan from the Jōmon period, as shown by finds of stone and clay flutes and zithers having between two and four strings, to which Yayoi period metal bells and gongs were added to create early musical ensembles. By the early historical period (6th to 7th centuries), there were a variety of large and small drums, gongs, chimes, flutes, and stringed instruments, such as the imported mandolin-like biwa and the flat six-stringed zither, which evolved into the thirteen-stringed koto. These instruments formed the orchestras for the 7th-century continentally derived ceremonial court music (gagaku), which, together with the accompanying bugaku (a type of court dance), are the most ancient of such forms still performed at the Imperial court, ancient temples, and shrines. Buddhism introduced the rhythmic chants, still used, that underpin Shigin, and that were joined with native ideas to underlay the development of vocal music, such as in Noh.

== Aesthetic concepts ==
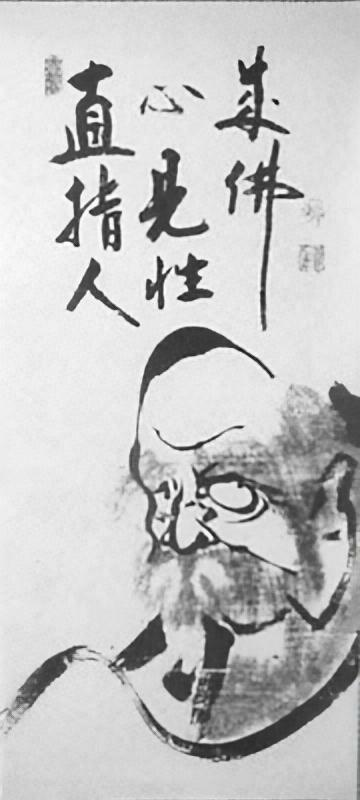
Calligraphy of Bodhidharma, "Zen points directly to the human heart, see into your nature and become Buddha", Hakuin Ekaku, 17th century

Japanese art is characterized by unique polarities. In the ceramics of the prehistoric periods, for example, exuberance was followed by disciplined and refined artistry. Another instance is provided by two 16th-century structures that are poles apart: the Katsura Detached Palace is an exercise in simplicity, with an emphasis on natural materials, rough and untrimmed, and an affinity for beauty achieved by accident; Nikkō Tōshō-gū is a rigidly symmetrical structure replete with brightly colored relief carvings covering every visible surface. Japanese art, valued not only for its simplicity but also for its colorful exuberance, has considerably influenced 19th-century Western painting and 20th-century Western architecture.

Japan's aesthetic conceptions, deriving from diverse cultural traditions, have been formative in the production of unique art forms. Over the centuries, a wide range of artistic motifs developed and were refined, becoming imbued with symbolic significance. Like a pearl, they acquired many layers of meaning and a high luster. Japanese aesthetics provide a key to understanding artistic works perceivably different from those coming from Western traditions.

Within the East Asian artistic tradition, China has been the acknowledged teacher and Japan the devoted student. Nevertheless, several Japanese arts developed their own style, which can be differentiated from various Chinese arts. The monumental, symmetrically balanced, rational approach of Chinese art forms became miniaturized, irregular, and subtly suggestive in Japanese hands. Miniature rock gardens, diminutive plants (bonsai), and ikebana (flower arrangements), in which the selected few represented a garden, were the favorite pursuits of refined aristocrats for a millennium, and they have remained a part of contemporary cultural life.

The diagonal, reflecting a natural flow, rather than the fixed triangle, became the favored structural device, whether in painting, architectural or garden design, dance steps, or musical notations. Odd numbers replace even numbers in the regularity of a Chinese master pattern, and a pull to one side allows a motif to turn the corner of a three-dimensional object, thus giving continuity and motion that is lacking in a static frontal design. Japanese painters used the devices of the cutoff, close-up, and fade-out by the 12th century in yamato-e, or Japanese-style, scroll painting, perhaps one reason why modern filmmaking has been such a natural and successful art form in Japan. Suggestion is used rather than direct statement; oblique poetic hints and allusive and inconclusive melodies and thoughts have proved frustrating to the Westerner trying to penetrate the meanings of literature, music, painting, and even everyday language.

The Japanese began defining such aesthetic ideas in a number of evocative phrases by at least the 10th or 11th century. The courtly refinements of the aristocratic Heian period evolved into the elegant simplicity seen as the essence of good taste in the understated art that is called shibui. Two terms originating from Zen Buddhist meditative practices describe degrees of tranquility: one, the repose found in humble melancholy (wabi), the other, the serenity accompanying the enjoyment of subdued beauty (sabi). Zen thought also contributed a penchant for combining the unexpected or startling, used to jolt one's consciousness toward the goal of enlightenment. In art, this approach was expressed in combinations of such unlikely materials as lead inlaid in lacquer and in clashing poetic imagery. Unexpectedly humorous and sometimes grotesque images and motifs also stem from the Zen kōan (conundrum). Although the arts have been mainly secular since the Edo period, traditional aesthetics and training methods, stemming generally from religious sources, continue to underlie artistic productions.

=== Traditional aesthetics ===
Traditional Japanese Aesthetics are forms of beauty in Japanese culture that derive from the earliest centuries. At least over two-hundred years ago. Some of these early aesthetics make up the Japanese aesthetic as a whole: Syncretic Buddhist Art, Wabi-Sabi, Miyabi, Shibui, and Jo-ha-Kyu.

==== Wabi-Sabi ====
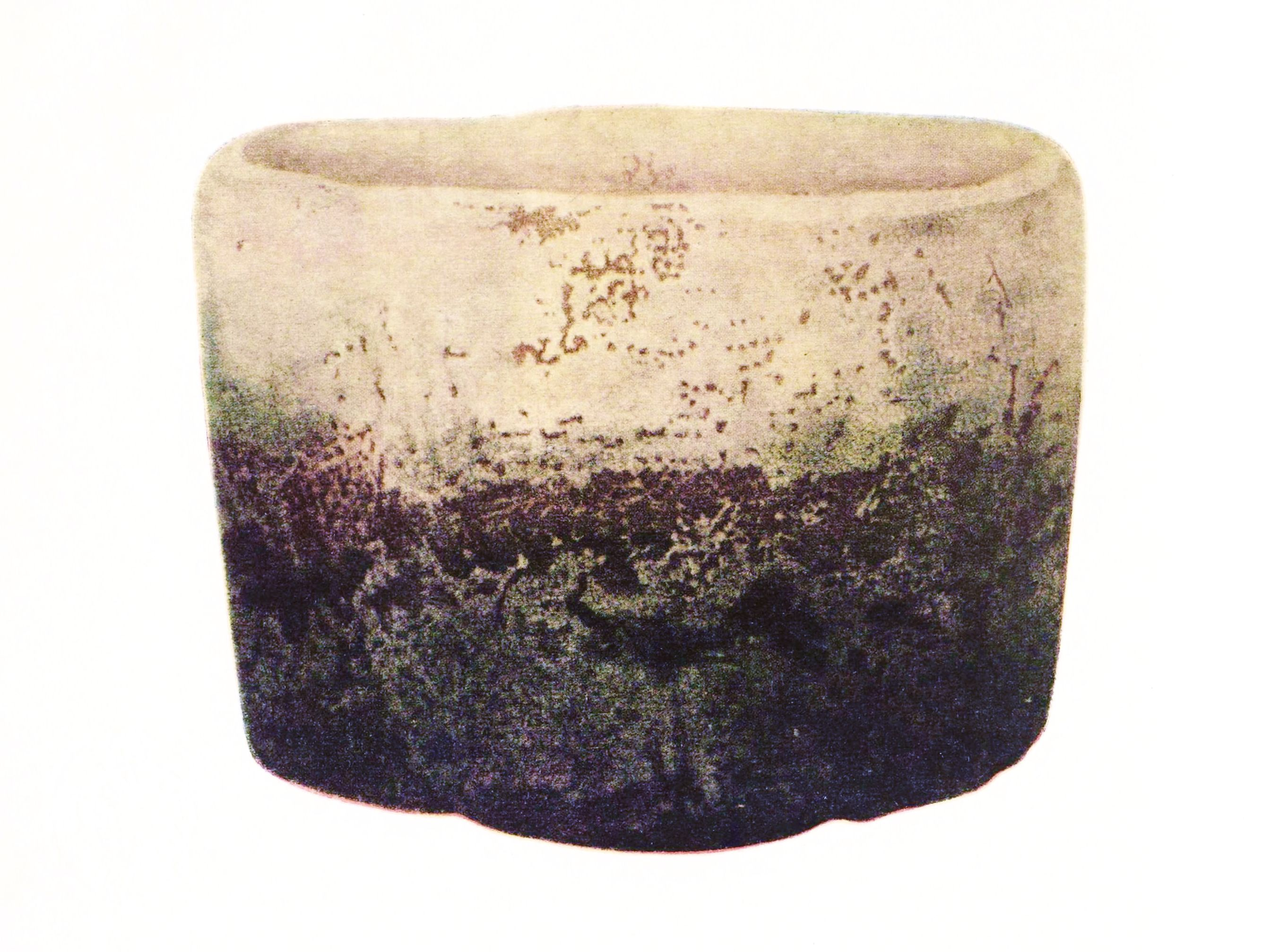
"Fujisan" white Raku ware tea bowl (chawan) by Hon'ami Kōetsu, Edo period (National Treasure)

This aesthetic in Japanese culture is known for many things such as beauty in all things, even those that are imperfect. Modesty and unconventional things are what are seen as the wabi-sabi aesthetic. Wabi and sabi both make up the aesthetic of beauty in incompleteness together. When separated, both serve as differing terms. Wabi stands for fresh, simple work, denoting all complication and having a very rustic feel to all it relates too. Being made from nature and made from man itself in a tandem. If made by accident, it brings about a certain uniqueness to the work. Sabi is beauty and how it originates from age. The cycle of life plays a great role in sabi, adding to the aesthetic that sense of beauty in works that receive mending damage from aging over time. When bringing wabi and sabi together, it creates the aesthetic that every simple piece developed does not require a complicated design. Nor does it require absolute completeness for beauty to be found in it, and with age comes more delicate beauty.

Wabi-sabi has always been related to tea ceremonies in Japanese culture. It is said that these ceremonies are profound wabi-sabi events. Wabi-sabi is also related to activities such as architecture, fashion, and philosophy. All of these portions of wabi-sabi all share belief in the same theme: all imperfections such as incomplete work holds undeniable beauty. However, not everyone, of course, favors the idea behind wabi-sabi. While this is true, there are many who wish to keep the belief alive despite what others believe. Overall, wabi-sabi seems to be a very mindful approach to everyday life. A calm way to see things, and a way to live without coming off as judgmental. When understanding wabi-sabi, there are terms that strongly relate to the aesthetic as well.

Fukinsei: asymmetry, irregularity.
Kanso: simplicity.
Koko: basic, weathered.
Shizen: without pretense, natural.
Yugen: subtly profound grace, not obvious.
Datsuzoku: unbounded by convention, free.
Seijaku: tranquility, silence.

Each of these terms are used to break down the complete understanding of wabi-sabi. It more so relates to the philosophy aspect of the entire aesthetic and how to view one's surroundings. These can allude to several things including the ideas in humans, the themes behind certain aspects of life, or nature itself. Each term leads back to the point that wabi-sabi is an aesthetic that is about appreciating the small things that are imperfect and or incomplete.

==== Miyabi ====
In the ongoing history of Japan, miyabi can stand for many things. However, it seems to be centered around the concept of elegance, beauty, refinement, and courtliness. For this, it is one of the older aesthetics among most of the Japanese aesthetics in the culture. That would explain why it is not as popular as the rest which may be newer compared to miyabi. It is a term that is also used to express aristocratic culture. Miyabi eliminates all forms of rudeness and crudity from the culture. This brings about the proper picture and form of aristocratic culture. Miyabi brings about these changes. Miyabi ensures that refinement of love, literature, feeling, and art is celebrated within the Japanese culture. Refinement is welcomed.

==== Shibui ====
Shibui is coming to understand an object or an art piece for what it is. Locating simple and subtle beauty in certain things is a goal when it comes to designing or reviewing certain designs. In many ways, shibui is very similar to wabi-sabi but is not wabi-sabi. Shibui appreciates items and objects for simply being. There is no complication or irrational thinking when it comes down to shibui. Akin to certain aesthetics in the Japanese culture, there are a couple of terms in relation to Shibui: shibumi is the taste of shibui; Shibusa is the state of shibui.

Both these terms relate to subtle, unobtrusive beauty. There are several items and objects that can be considered a part of the shibui aesthetic, not just art or fashion. It can also be people, animals, songs, movies, several different types of media can be seen as shibui. For example, a pair of shoes, a camera, a moped bike, and several different pieces of art or objects used for everyday activity can be seen as shibui. Direct and simple is the way of shibui. Nothing over the top or too flashy.

==== Jo-ha-kyu ====
This is an aesthetic that originated from the Noh Theatre and even appeared in the 14th century. It is used in different art forms in Japan even still today. It is a movement that has been applied in several different arts with jo, ha, and kyu standing for individual things to make up its definition: jo, 'beginning'; ha, 'break', 'crack'; kyu: 'rapid', 'over'

Essentially, what this aesthetic means is that when it comes down to pieces that deal with movement, things should start slowly with proper build-up. Almost akin to how a story is told. Then once it reaches its climax, it speeds up. When it reaches its end, then that is when things begin to rapidly speed up until all of a sudden it has reached an ending.

=== Modern concepts ===
Modern Japanese art is often heavily influenced by the nation's unique relationship with technology, frequently marrying traditional forms and concepts with new aesthetics and anxieties of the technological present, as well as being heavily influenced by the nation's varied economic history following the Second World War. Modern Japanese art engages heavily with themes of isolation and depersonalization, as well as the growing power and influence of digital technologies and the degree to which Japanese culture is affected by and exerts influence on an increasingly globalized and interconnected world.

As Japan was one of the first nations to be connected to the Internet on a large scale and one of the first countries to adopt widespread cellphone use, Japanese art was among the first forms of art to critically evaluate the dramatic social effects that ubiquitous connectivity have had on society. Conversely, the amount of Japanese art distributed on the Internet meant that Japanese art and aesthetics, including mass-culture art such as manga and anime, were enormously influential on Internet culture throughout the 1990s and 2000s, an influence that is not only still felt today, but also encouraged Japanese artists to continue to critically explore the nature of online life.

Japanese art has also been influenced by the increasing role of the nation's mass-culture art in global pop culture. Manga, anime, video games, mass market movies and associated cultural products have continued to become larger and more influential within the world of Japanese art since the 1970s, and themes expressed in these works have often mirrored the nation's current anxieties. The aesthetic language and conventions of these media have increasingly come to represent the totality of Japanese art and culture abroad as well; the aesthetic of kawaii, for example, originally was derived from traditional concepts within Japanese art dating back to the 15th century, but was explored within popular manga and anime series in postwar Japan, and today is commonly seen as central to contemporary Japanese culture.

Akari Light sculptures by Isamu Noguchi, Noguchi Museum, New York

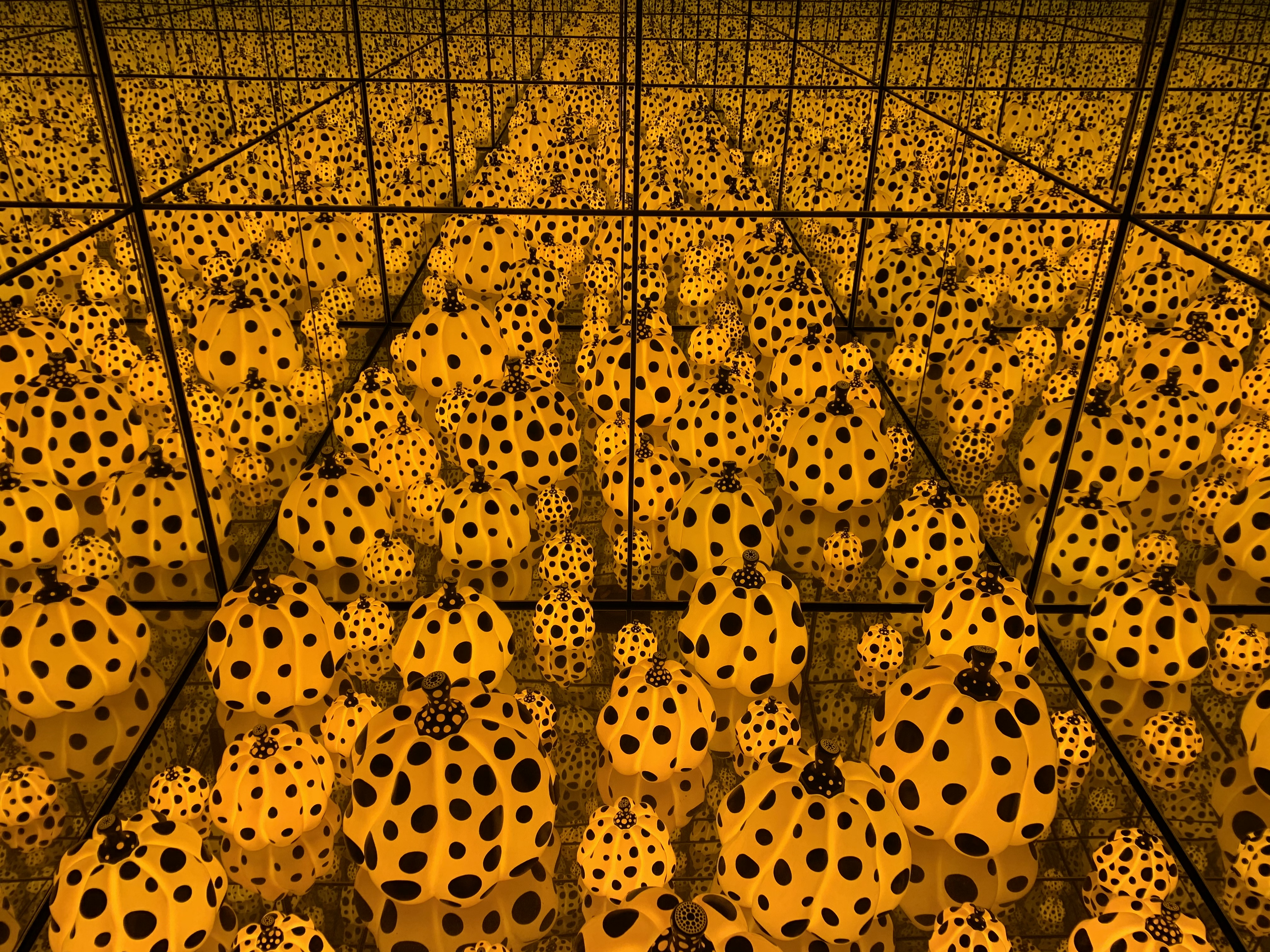
Yayoi Kusama, The Spirits of the Pumpkins Descended into the Heavens (2017), National Gallery of Australia, Canberra, Australia

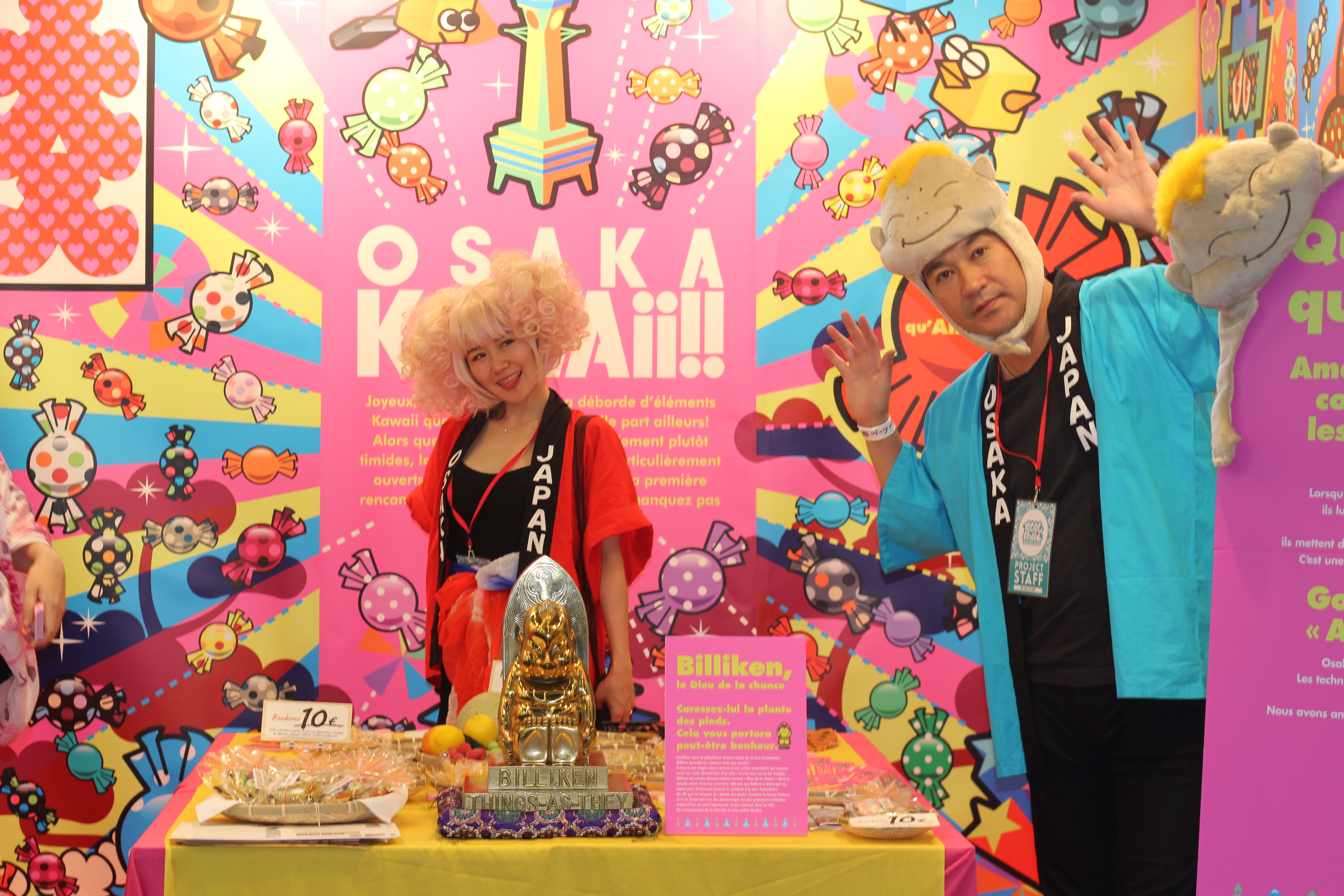
"Osaka Kawaii" exhibit at Japan Expo 2014. Japan has attempted to use the popularity of Japanese art to bolster the nation's soft power through initiatives such as Cool Japan.

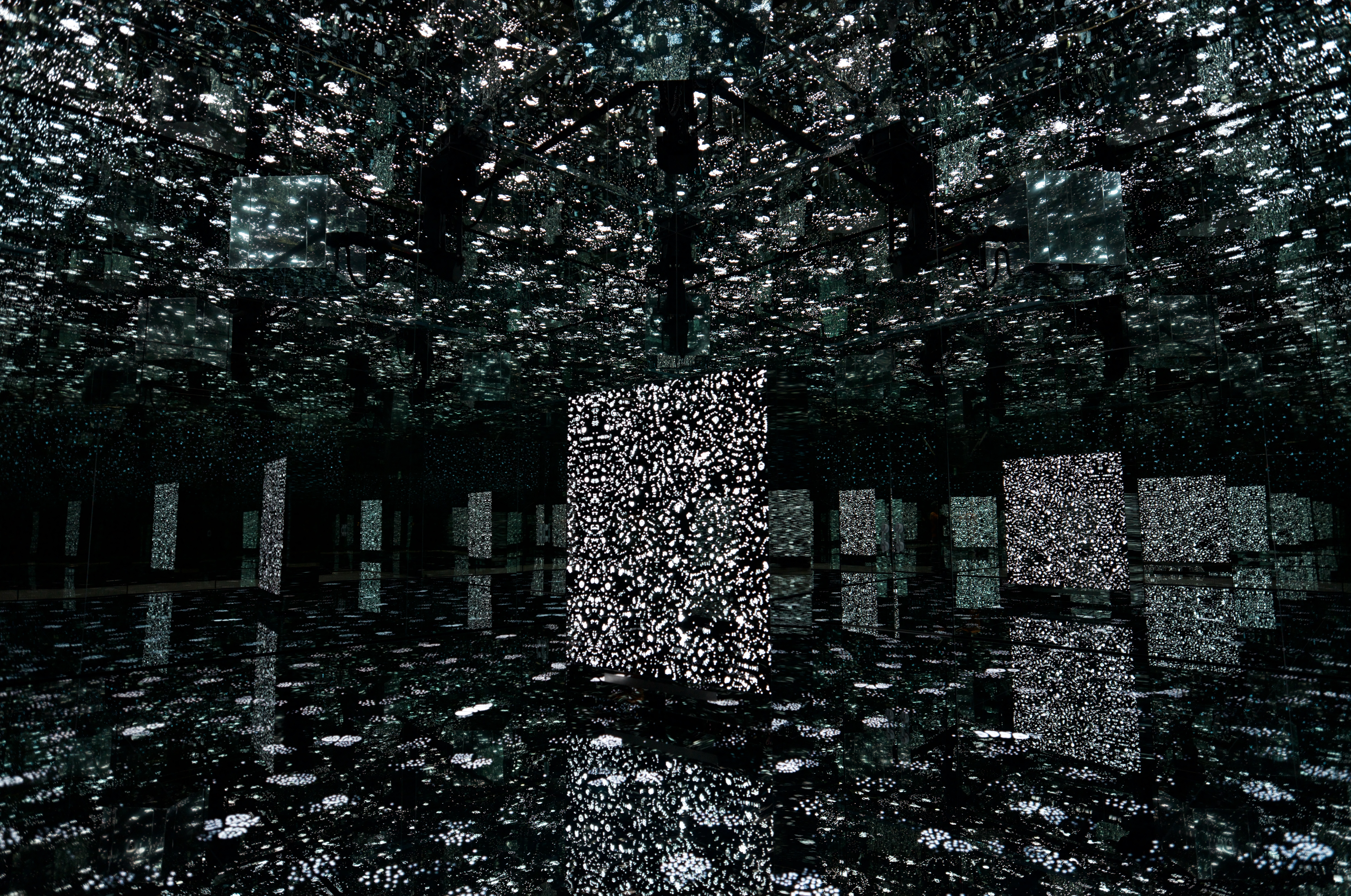
Interior view of Yoichi Ochiai's null² pavilion, Expo 2025, Osaka, Kansai (2025)

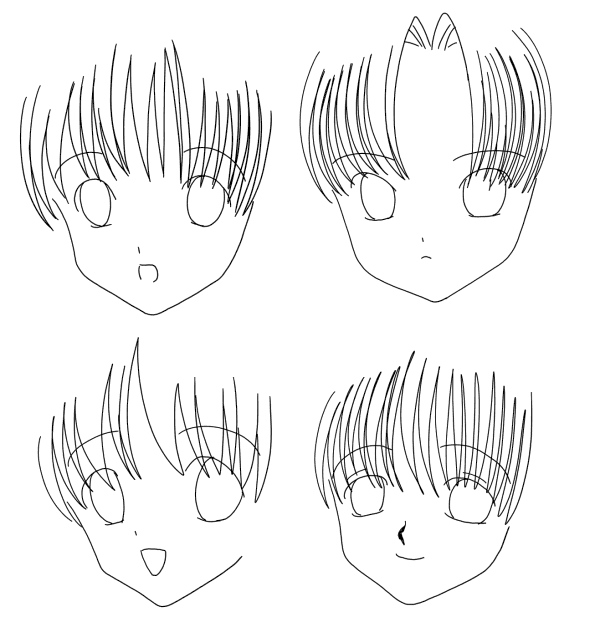
A drawing style common in manga. In recent decades, manga has not only become globally popular, but now also defines a key Japanese aesthetic. Over time, the art styles commonly found in manga have shifted in response to artistic evolutions.

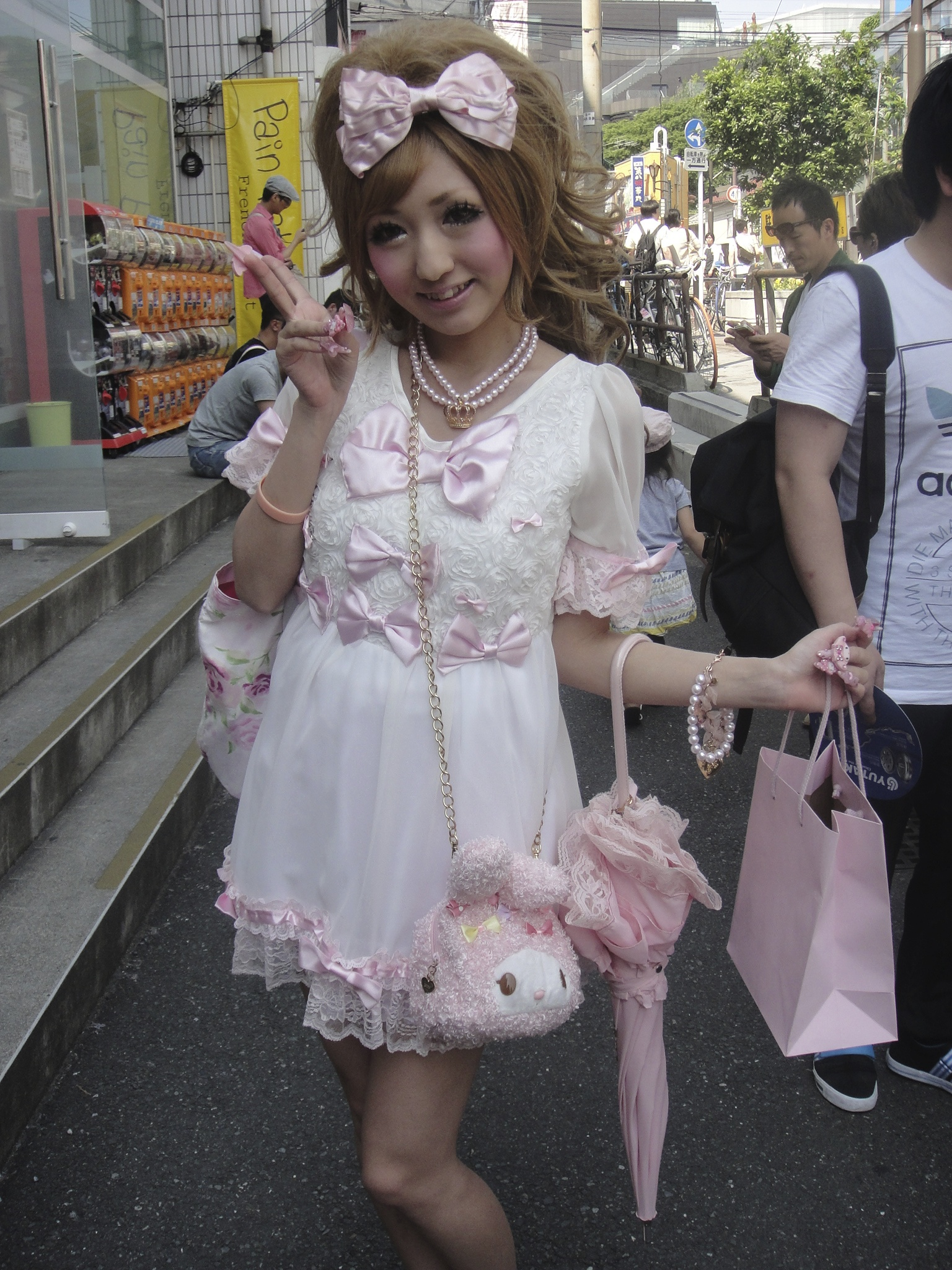
Kawaii fashion found in Tokyo; here particularly hime gyaru. Popular among youth subcultures in the early 2000s, kawaii fashion rapidly differentiated into a number of aesthetic subcultures, including for example lolita fashion and Gyaru. The model pictured here is Himena Ousaki.

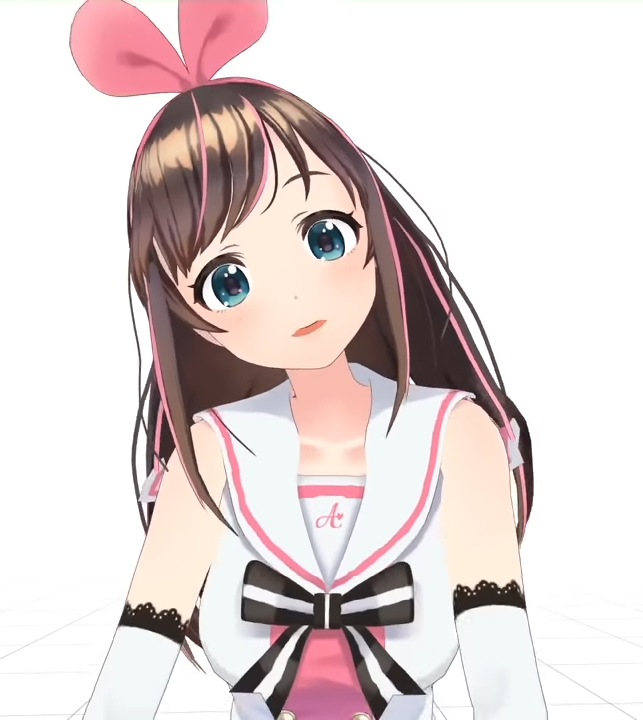
Kizuna Ai, the first large-scale VTuber, a virtual anime-inspired character portrayed in real time by an actor through the use of motion tracking software. VTubers became popular in Japan in the mid-2010's, before rapidly growing in popularity worldwide.

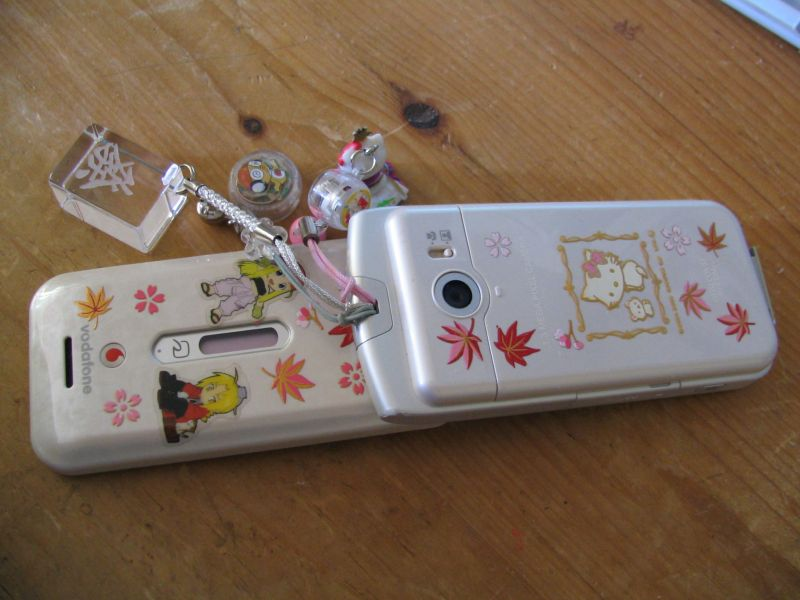
A Japanese flip phone typical of the 2000s with phone charms. These phones and charms were symbolic of youth culture in the early Heisei era, and remained prevalent in Japan long after the advent of the smartphone made flip phones obsolete elsewhere.

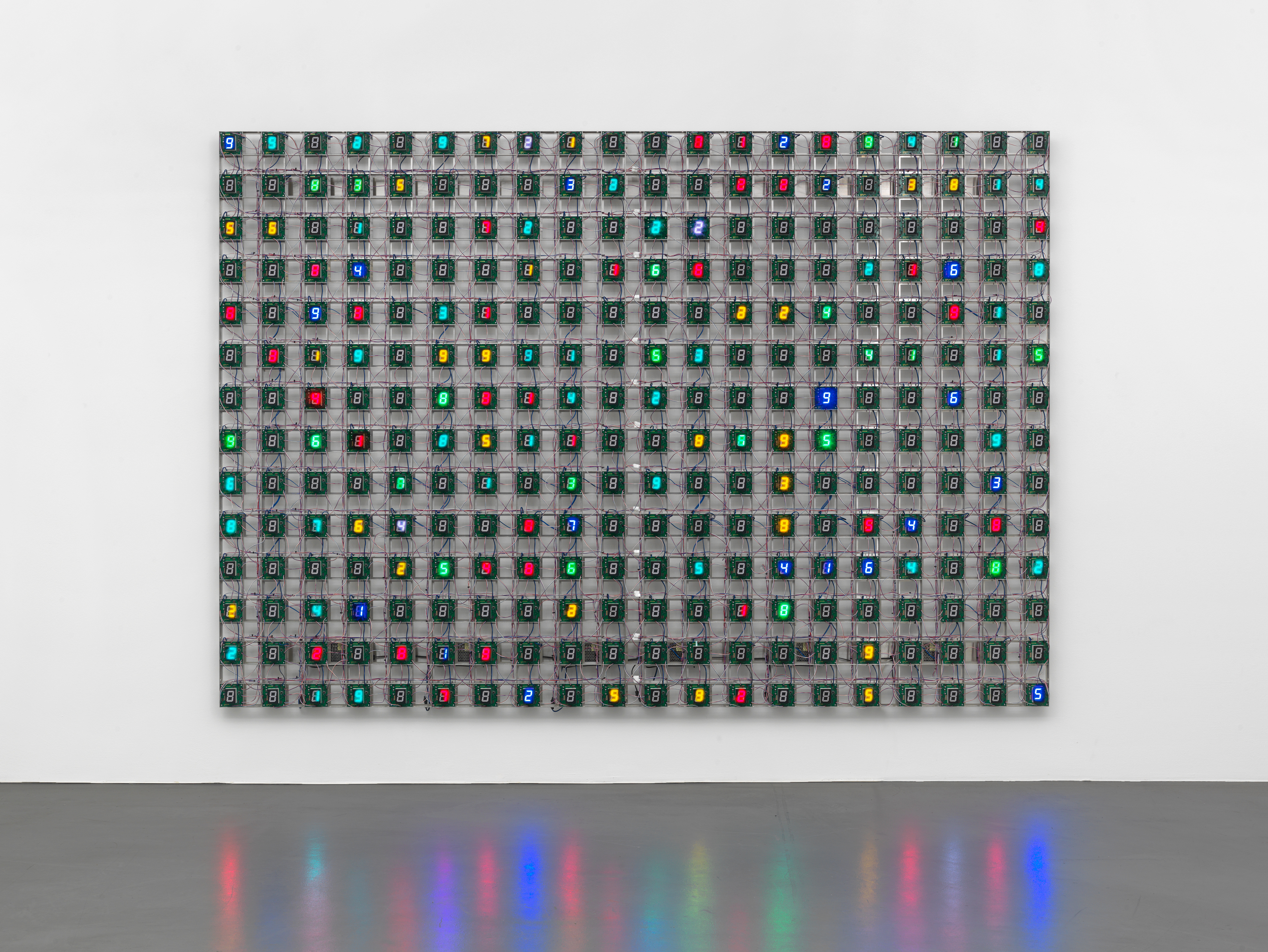
Tatsuo Miyajima, Life (Rhizome) No 3. (2012)

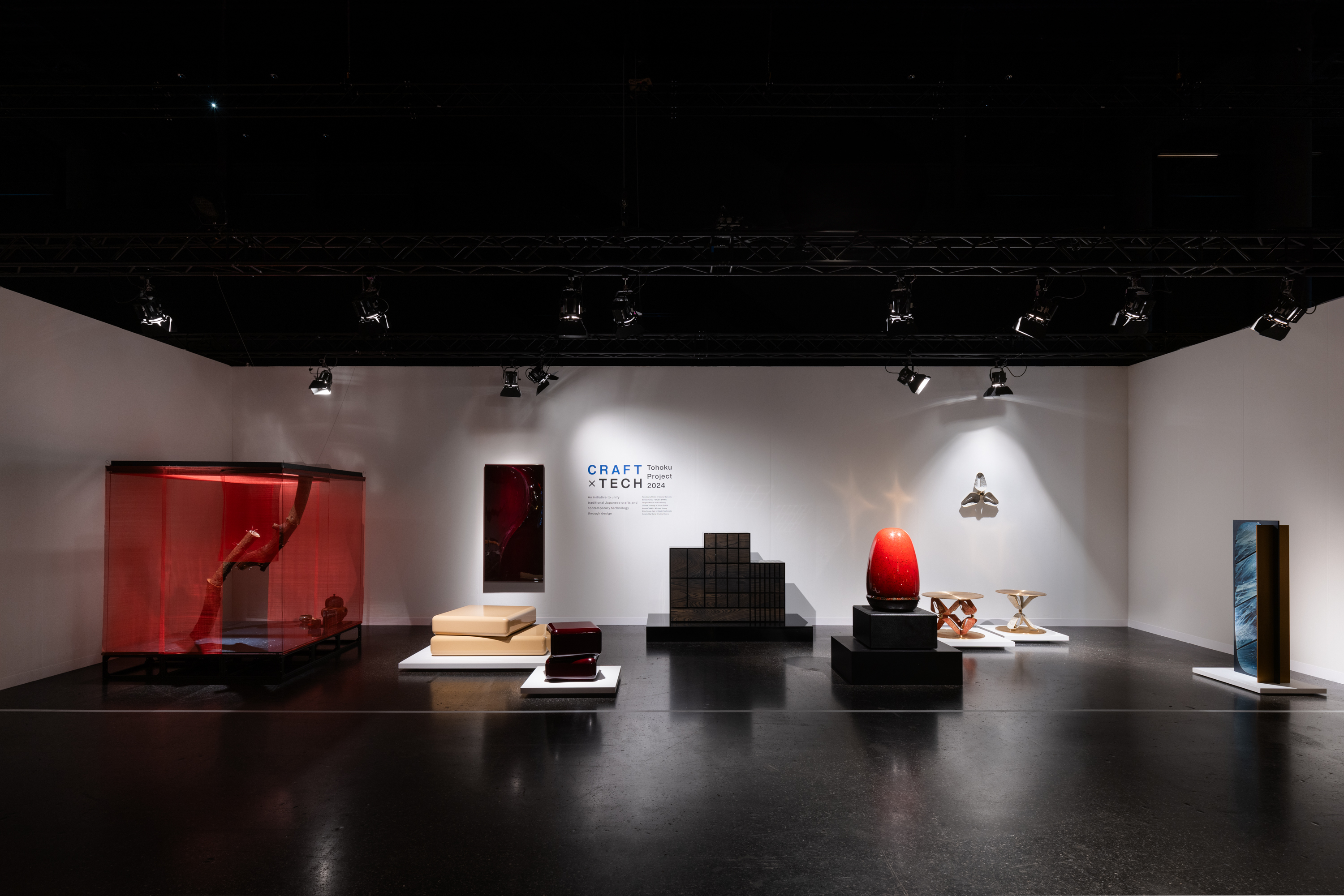
Craft x Tech Tohoku Project at Design Miami Art Basel (2024)

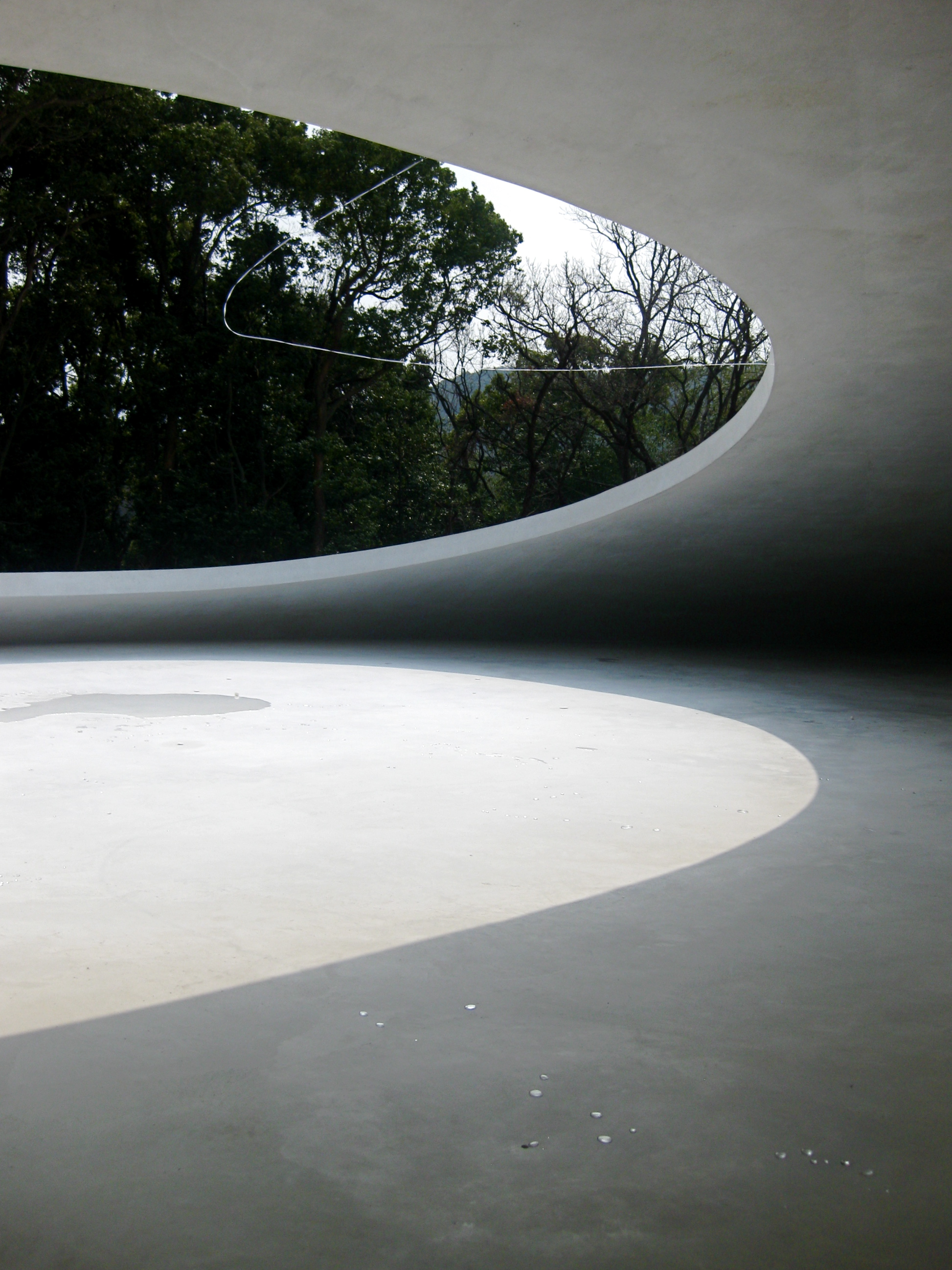
Teshima Museum by Ryue Nishizawa and Rei Naito (2010)

== Artists ==
Traditionally, the artist was a vehicle for expression and was personally reticent, in keeping with the role of an artisan or entertainer of low social status. The calligrapher, a member of the Confucian literati class, or samurai class in Japan, had a higher status, while artists of great genius were often recognized in the Kamakura period by receiving a name from a feudal lord and thus rising socially. The performing arts, however, were generally held in less esteem, and the purported immorality of actresses of the early Kabuki theater caused the Tokugawa government to bar women from the stage; female roles in Kabuki and Noh thereafter were played by men.

After World War II, artists typically gathered in arts associations, some of which were long-established professional societies while others reflected the latest arts movement. The Japan Artists League, for example, was responsible for the largest number of major exhibitions, including the prestigious annual Nitten (Japan Art Exhibition). The PEN Club of Japan (PEN stands for prose, essay, and narrative), a branch of an international writers' organization, was the largest of some thirty major authors' associations. Actors, dancers, musicians, and other performing artists boasted their own societies, including the Kabuki Society, organized in 1987 to maintain this art's traditional high standards, which were thought to be endangered by modern innovation. By the 1980s, however, avant-garde painters and sculptors had eschewed all groups and were "unattached" artists.

=== Art schools ===
There are a number of specialized universities for the arts in Japan, led by the national universities. The most important is the Tokyo Arts University, one of the most difficult of all national universities to enter. Another seminal center is Tama Art University, which produced many of Japan's late 20th-century innovative young artists. Traditional training in the arts, derived from Chinese traditional methods, remains; experts teach from their homes or head schools working within a master-pupil relationship. A pupil does not experiment with a personal style until achieving the highest level of training, or graduating from an arts school, or becoming head of a school. Many young artists have criticized this system as stifling creativity and individuality. A new generation of the avant-garde has broken with this tradition, often receiving its training in the West. In the traditional arts, however, the master-pupil system preserves the secrets and skills of the past. Some master-pupil lineages can be traced to the Kamakura period, from which they continue to use a great master's style or theme. Japanese artists consider technical virtuosity as the sine qua non of their professions, a fact recognized by the rest of the world as one of the hallmarks of Japanese art.

The national government has actively supported the arts through the Agency for Cultural Affairs, set up in 1968 as a special body of the Ministry of Education. The agency's budget for FY 1989 rose to ¥37.8 billion after five years of budget cuts, but still represented much less than 1 percent of the general budget. The agency's Cultural Affairs Division disseminated information about the arts within Japan and internationally, and the Cultural Properties Protection Division (文化財保護部, now 文化財部) protected the nation's cultural heritage. The Cultural Affairs Division is concerned with such areas as art and culture promotion, arts copyrights, and improvements in the national language. It also supports both national and local arts and cultural festivals, and it funds traveling cultural events in music, theater, dance, art exhibitions, and filmmaking. Special prizes are offered to encourage young artists and established practitioners, and some grants are given each year to enable them to train abroad. The agency funds national museums of modern art in Kyoto and Tokyo and The National Museum of Western Art in Tokyo, which exhibit both Japanese and international shows. The agency also supports the Japan Art Academy, which honors eminent persons of arts and letters, appointing them to membership and offering ¥3.5 million in prize money. Awards are made in the presence of the Emperor, who personally bestows the highest accolade, the Order of Culture. Tokyo University of the Arts also taking active roles on several art events in previous years. Their other campuses are also involving varied courses.

=== Private sponsorship and foundations ===
Government patronage and promotion of the arts expanded to include a cooperative effort with Japanese corporations to provide funding alongside the budget of the Agency for Cultural Affairs. Other public and private institutions also participate in awarding arts prizes. Corporations join major newspapers in sponsoring exhibitions and performances and in giving annual prizes. Literary awards presented include the Naoki Prize and the Akutagawa Prize.

In 1989 an effort to promote cross-cultural exchange led to the establishment of a Japanese "Nobel Prize" for the arts, the Premium Imperiale, by the Japan Art Association. This prize of US$100,000 was funded largely by the mass media conglomerate Fujisankei Communications Group and was awarded on a worldwide selection basis.

A number of foundations promoting the arts arose in the 1980s, including the Cultural Properties Foundation set up to preserve historic sites overseas, especially along the Silk Road in Inner Asia and at Dunhuang in China. Another international arrangement was made in 1988 with the United States Smithsonian Institution for cooperative exchange of high-technology studies of Asian artifacts. The government plays a major role by funding the Japan Foundation, which provides both institutional and individual grants, effects scholarly exchanges, awards annual prizes, supported publications and exhibitions, and sends traditional Japanese arts groups to perform abroad. The Arts Festival held for two months each fall for all the performing arts is sponsored by the Agency for Cultural Affairs. Major cities also provides substantial support for the arts; a growing number of cities in the 1980s had built large centers for the performing arts and, stimulated by government funding, were offering prizes such as the Lafcadio Hearn Prize initiated by the city of Matsue. A number of new municipal museums were also providing about one-third more facilities in the 1980s than were previously available. In the late 1980s, Tokyo added more than twenty new cultural halls, notably, the large Bunkamura built by Tokyu Group and the reconstruction of Shakespeare's Globe Theatre. All these efforts reflect a rising popular enthusiasm for the arts. Japanese art buyers swept the Western art markets in the late 1980s, paying record highs for impressionist paintings and US$51.7 million alone for one blue period Picasso.

== See also ==
- First Gutai Exhibition
- List of National Treasures of Japan (crafts: others)
- Culture of Japan
  - Buddhist art
  - History of Asian art
  - History of painting
- List of collections of Japanese art
- Art galleries
  - Japan
    - Tokyo National Museum, est. 1872
    - Kyoto National Museum, est. 1889
    - Nara National Museum, est. 1889
    - Kyushu National Museum, est. 2005
  - United States
    - Freer Gallery of Art, est. 1923
    - Museum of Fine Arts, Boston
- Japanese artists category
- Musha-e

== Sources ==
- This article was originally based on material from WebMuseum Paris – Famous Artworks exhibition .
- Japan –
- Boardman, John, "The Diffusion of Classical Art in Antiquity", Princeton University Press, 1994, ISBN 0-691-03680-2
- Earle, Joe (1999). Splendors of Meiji : treasures of imperial Japan: masterpieces from the Khalili Collection. St. Petersburg, Fla.: Broughton International Inc. ISBN 1-874780-13-7. OCLC 42476594.
- Impey, Oliver, in Battie, David, ed., Sotheby's Concise Encyclopedia of Porcelain, 71-74, 1990, Conran Octopus. ISBN 1-85029-251-5
- Kaempfer, H. M. and W. O. G. Sickinghe The Fascinating World of the Japanese Artist. A Collection of Essays on Japanese Art by Members of the Society for Japanese Arts and Crafts, The Hague, Society for Japanese Arts and Crafts, 1971. ISBN 0-87093-156-3
- Kapur, Nick (2018). Japan at the Crossroads: Conflict and Compromise after Anpo. Cambridge, MA: Harvard University Press. ISBN 978-0-674-98442-4.
- "Alexander the Great: East-West Cultural contacts from Greece to Japan" (NHK and Tokyo National Museum, 2003)
- "De l'Indus à l'Oxus, Archéologie de l'Asie Centrale", Osmund Bopearachchi, Christine Sachs, ISBN 2-9516679-2-2
- "The Crossroads of Asia, Transformation in image and symbols", 1992, ISBN 0-9518399-1-8
