= Extermination of Evil =

Set of five handing scrolls held at the Nara national museum

Extermination of evil
- Artist: Unknown
- Year: 12th century
- Type: Hanging scrolls
- Medium: Paper
- Dimensions: 25.8 to 26.0 centimetres (10.2 to 10.2 in) in height and 39.2 to 77.2 centimetres (15.4 to 30.4 in) in width
- Location: Nara National Museum; Nara, Nara

Extermination of evil (辟邪絵, Hekija-E) is a set of five paintings depicting traditional Asian deities banishing evil. The paintings are collectively listed as a national treasure of Japan and held at the Nara national museum.

== Overview ==
The paintings are thought to have been created during the 12th century, during the reign of Emperor Go-Shirakawa in the Heian period; they may have also been produced during the Kamakura period. The calligrapher is thought to be the same on the five scrolls as on the hell scroll and the demon of punishment, which were produced at roughly the same time. They are thought to have originally been a single handscroll, known as the "second edition of the Masuda family hell scroll", that was stored in the Rengeō-in Temple (now Sanjūsangen-dō). The paintings depict five benevolent deities in combat against evil, as represented by demons; the deities come from several cultures, including contemporary Japanese, Chinese, and Indian. They are thought to be associated with the hell transformation screens then used in Nara for repentance ceremonies at the end of each year, where the devout recited the names of the buddhas at Heijō Palace.

The paintings were designated National Treasures of Japan on 6 June 1985, with the accession number 1106. They are located at the Nara National Museum in Nara, Nara Prefecture.

== Works ==
=== Tenkeisei ===
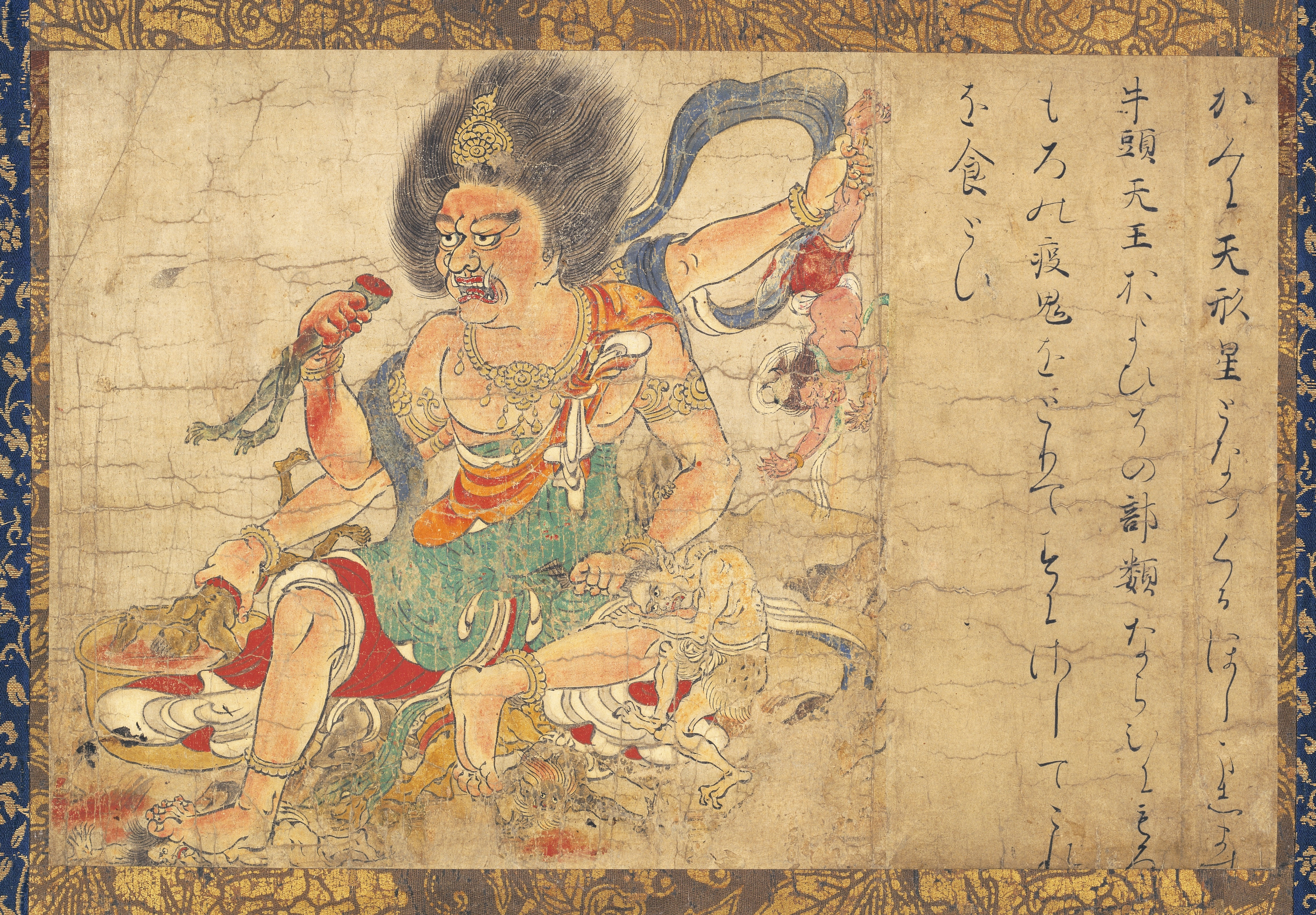
Tenkeisei.

Tenkeisei (天刑星, literally meaning "the star [that metes out] heavenly punishment"), or the god of heavenly punishment, is a deity from the Chinese tradition of yin and yang. Originally a demon, he later took on a role in Vajrayana prayers. In the painting he is depicted fighting and consuming Gozu tennō, an ox-headed deity worshipped at the Gion shrine (present day Yasaka) in Kyoto (京都市, Kyōto-shi). The painting measures 26 by 39.2 centimetres (10.2 by 15.4 in) and has the accession number 1106-1.

=== Sendan kendatsuba (Candana Gandharva) ===
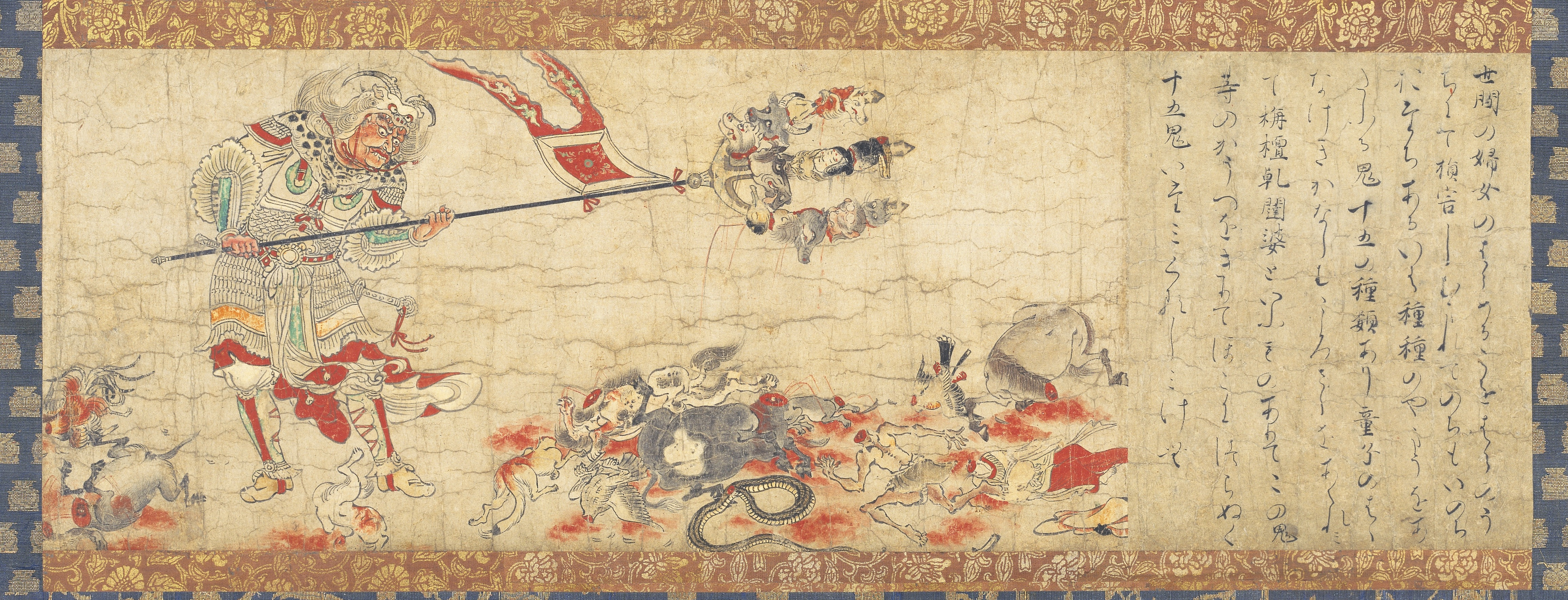
Sendan kendatsuba (Candana Gandharva).

Sendan kendatsuba (栴檀乾闥婆, Sanskrit name Candana Gandharva) is one of the eight guardians of Buddhist law and one of the 33 manifestations of Avalokiteśvara. He is derived from an Indian patron god of music and believed to protect young people from the fifteen malevolent deities. He is drawn similar to in the Dôji mandara. The painting measures 25.8 by 77.2 centimetres (10.2 by 30.4 in) and has the accession number 1106-2.

=== Shinchū ===
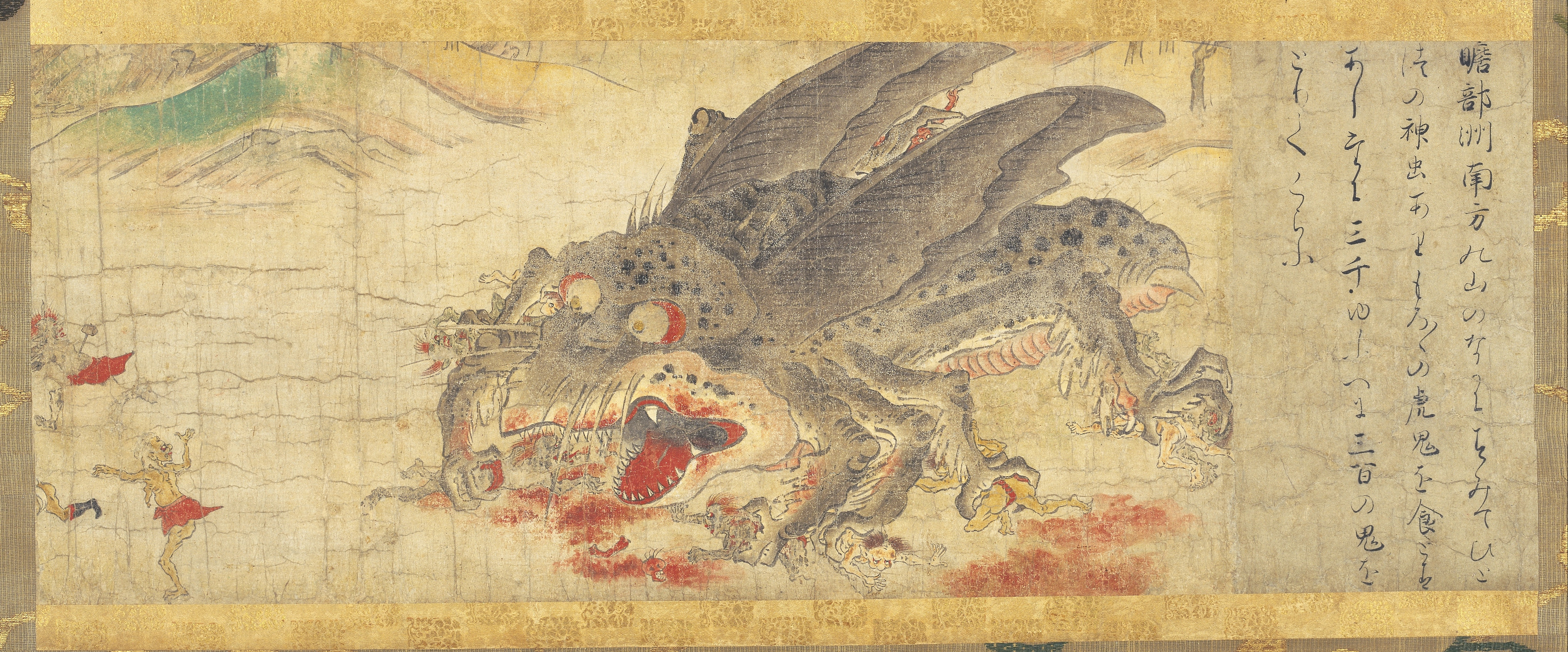
Shinchū.

The divine insect (神虫, Shinchū) is a deity depicted as a silkworm moth. It was known for miracles. The painting measures 25.8 by 70 centimetres (10.2 by 27.6 in) and has the accession number 1106-3.

=== Shōki ===
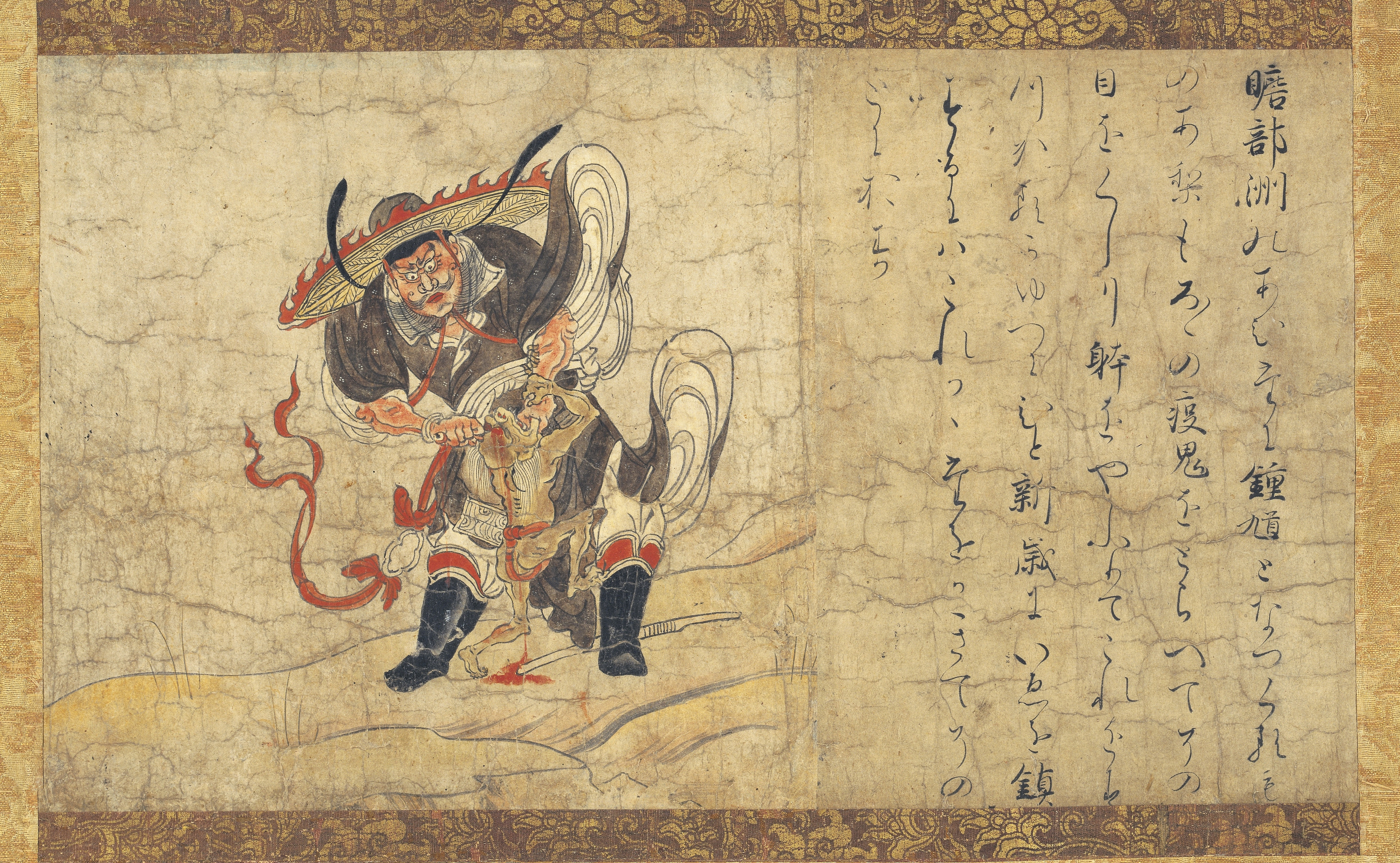
Shōki.

Shōki (鍾馗) is a deity told in Buddhist setsuwa (oral tales) to have protected Emperor Xuanzong of Tang. In the painting, Shōki is portrayed with a thick beard and large eyes. Wearing a black hat, robe, and tall boots, Shōki is shown stabbing a demon. The painting measures 25.8 by 45.2 centimetres (10.2 by 17.8 in) and has the accession number 1106-4.

=== Bishamonten ===
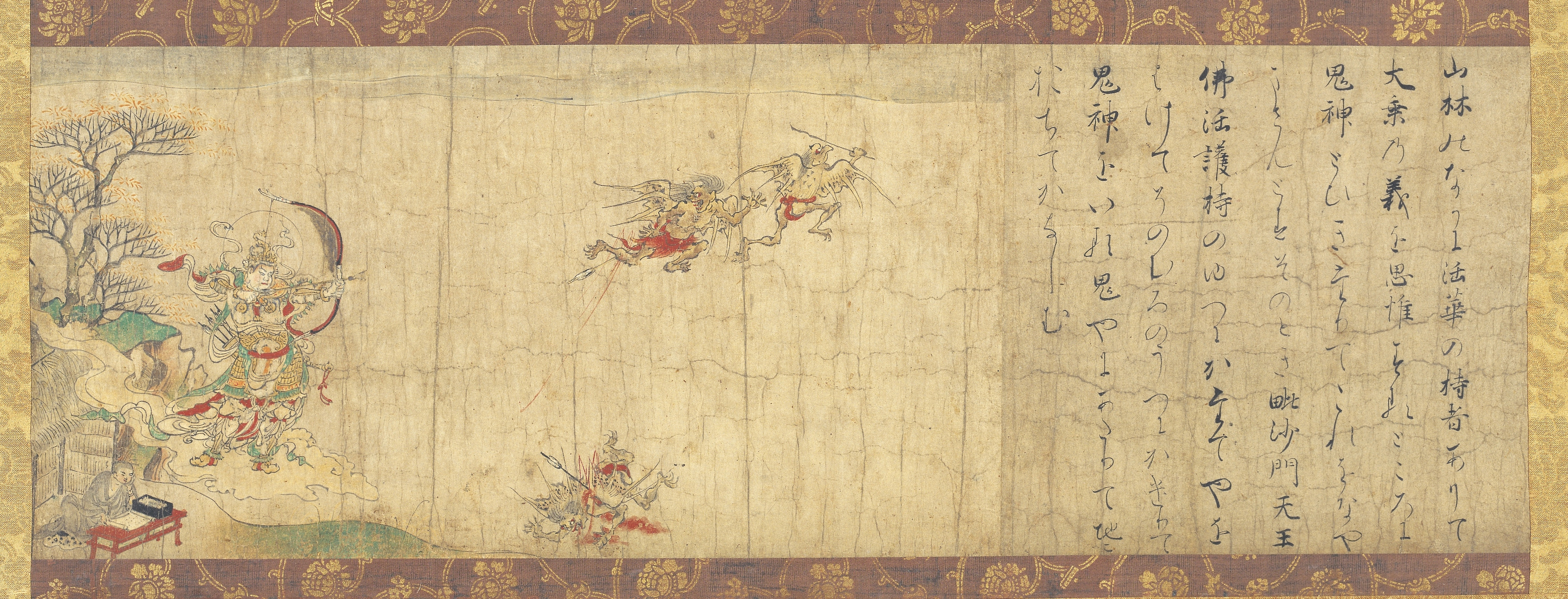
Bishamonten.

Bishamonten (毘沙門天) is the Japanese name for Vaiśravaṇa, the chief of the four heavenly kings. In the image, he is depicted protecting followers of the Lotus Sutra from evil while carrying a bow. His equipment is similar to that found in Chinese paintings from the Tang and Song dynasties. The painting measures 25.8 by 76.5 centimetres (10.2 by 30.1 in) and has the accession number 1106-5.

== See also ==
- List of National Treasures of Japan (paintings)
