= Hell Scroll =

Hell Scroll may refer to:

- Hell Scroll (Nara National Museum)
- Hell Scroll (Tokyo National Museum)
