= List of national treasures of Japan (paintings) =

National painting treasures of Japan

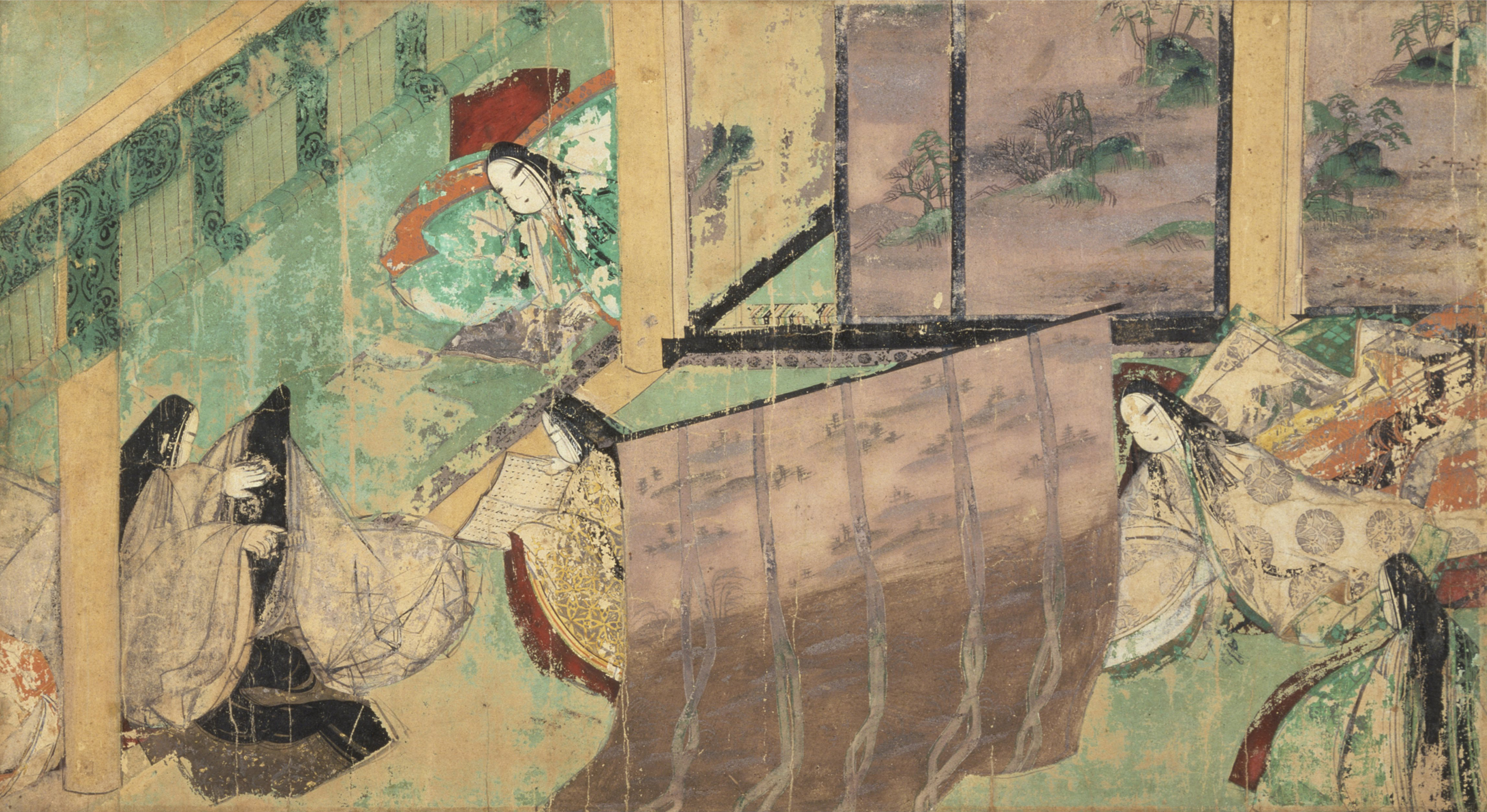
The Genji Monogatari Emaki, an illustrated scroll from The Tale of Genji, 12th century

The term "national treasure" has been used in Japan to denote cultural properties since 1897. The definition and the criteria have changed since the inception of the term. These paintings adhere to the current definition, and were designated national treasures when the Law for the Protection of Cultural Properties was implemented on June 9, 1951. As such, they are restricted in transfer and may not be exported. Owners are required to announce any changes to the national treasures such as damage or loss and need to obtain a permit for changes in location, transfer of ownership or intended repairs. The items are selected by the Ministry of Education, Culture, Sports, Science and Technology based on their "especially high historical or artistic value". This list contains 168 paintings from 7th-century Asuka period to the early modern 19th-century Edo period. In fact the number of paintings presented is more than 168, because in some cases groups of related paintings are combined to form a single entry. The paintings listed show Buddhist themes, landscapes, portraits and court scenes. Some of the paintings were imported directly from China. The titles of the works are descriptive rather than the artists' titles; therefore it is possible to find alternate names in the literature for a given work.

Beginning in the mid-6th century, as Buddhism was brought to Japan from Baekje, religious art was introduced from the mainland. The earliest religious paintings in Japan were copied using mainland styles and techniques, and are similar to the art of the Chinese Sui dynasty (581–618) or the late Sixteen Kingdoms around the early 5th century. They comprise the oldest extant non-primitive paintings in Japan. By the mid-Nara period (ca. 750) Japanese paintings showed influences of the Chinese Tang dynasty (618–907) and in the 9th century early Heian period evolved into the Kara-e genre. Wall murals in the Takamatsuzuka Tomb, the Kitora Tomb and the Portrait of Kichijōten at Yakushi-ji exemplify the Kara-e style. Generally, Nara period paintings show religious subjects, and the artists are unknown. During that period, sculptures rather than paintings were more prevalent.

Mandalas became predominant in the paintings of the early Heian period as esoteric Buddhism emerged with the Shingon and Tendai sects in the 8th and 9th centuries. The evolution of Pure Land Buddhism caused raigō-zu to be developed as a genre, characterised by depictions of the Amida welcoming the souls of the faithful to his Western Paradise as seen in a 1053 painting in the Phoenix-Hall of Byōdō-in. By the mid-Heian period, Chinese style kara-e painting was replaced with the classical Japanese yamato-e style, in which the images were painted primarily on sliding screens and byōbu folding screens. At the close of the Heian period around 1185, the practice of adorning emakimono hand scrolls with yamato-e paintings flourished. Examples of illustrated hand scrolls include novels such as Genji Monogatari Emaki, historical writings like The Tale of Great Minister Ban, or religious works such as the Scroll of Hungry Ghosts. These genres continued to be produced into the Kamakura period from 1185 to 1333. As during the Nara period, sculpture remained the preferred art form of the period.

Influenced by the Chinese Song and Yuan dynasties, Japanese monochrome ink painting called suibokuga largely replaced polychrome scroll paintings. By the end of the 14th century, monochrome landscape paintings (sansuiga) became the preferred genre for Zen painters, evolving to a unique Japanese style from the Chinese origin. Tenshō Shūbun, who created Reading in a Bamboo Grove (1446), and his student Sesshū Tōyō, author of Landscape of the Four Seasons, are the most well known priest-painters of the period. As with most of the early Japanese paintings, these works were created for Buddhist temples. At the end of the Muromachi period around 1573, ink painting had migrated out of the Zen monasteries, and was practised by artists from the Kanō school.

In contrast to the previous period, the paintings of the Momoyama period (1573–1615) were characterised by a grandiose polychrome style with extensive use of gold and silver foil. Large scale paintings were commissioned to adorn the castles and palaces of the military rulers. The Kanō school, patronized by the ruling class, was the most influential school of the period and, with 300 years of dominance, endured for the longest period in the history of Japanese painting. The trends of large polychrome paintings continued into the Edo period (1603–1868). The Rinpa school, best represented by Tawaraya Sōtatsu and Ogata Kōrin, used vibrant colors to depict classical themes from Japanese literature and Heian period poetry. In the 18th century, paintings of Yuan dynasty scholar-amateur painters were brought to Japan and imitated, giving rise to the Nanga or Bunjinga style of painting. Two of the most prominent painters of this school were Ike no Taiga and Yosa Buson.

== Statistics ==
The 168 entries in the list consist of the following: 93 are hanging scrolls; 41 are hand scrolls or emakimono; 24 are byōbu folding screens or paintings on fusuma sliding doors; five are murals; and three are albums. Two items, the portrait of Kichijōten and Illustrated Biography of Prince Shōtoku do not fall in any of these categories. The paintings are located in museums, Buddhist temples, Shinto shrines, private collections, a university and two are located in tombs (Takamatsuzuka Tomb and Kitora Tomb). A large proportion of items are housed in the national museums of Tokyo, Kyoto and Nara. The city containing the greatest number of national treasure paintings is Kyoto with 52 and Tokyo with 51 of which 28 are located in the Tokyo National Museum which is the structure housing the most painting national treasures.

Prefecture	City	National treasures
Aichi	Nagoya	1
Aichi	Tokoname	1
Fukuoka	Dazaifu	1
Fukuoka	Kurume	1
Hiroshima	Hatsukaichi	1
Hiroshima	Onomichi	1
Hyōgo	Kasai	1
Hyōgo	Kobe	1
Iwate	Hiraizumi	1
Kanagawa	Fujisawa	1
Kanagawa	Kamakura	4
Kanagawa	Yokohama	1
Kyoto	Kyoto	52
Kyoto	Uji	1
Kyoto	Maizuru	1
Nara	Asuka	2
Nara	Heguri	1
Nara	Nara	15
Nara	Uda	1
Okayama	Kurashiki	2
Osaka	Kawachinagano	1
Osaka	Osaka	6
Osaka	Shimamoto	1
Shiga	Hikone	1
Shiga	Ōtsu	3
Shizuoka	Atami	1
Tokyo	Tokyo	51
Tottori	Chizu	1
Wakayama	Kinokawa	1
Wakayama	Mount Kōya	8
Yamagata	Yonezawa	1
Yamaguchi	Hōfu	1
Yamanashi	Kōshū	1
Yamanashi	Minobu	1

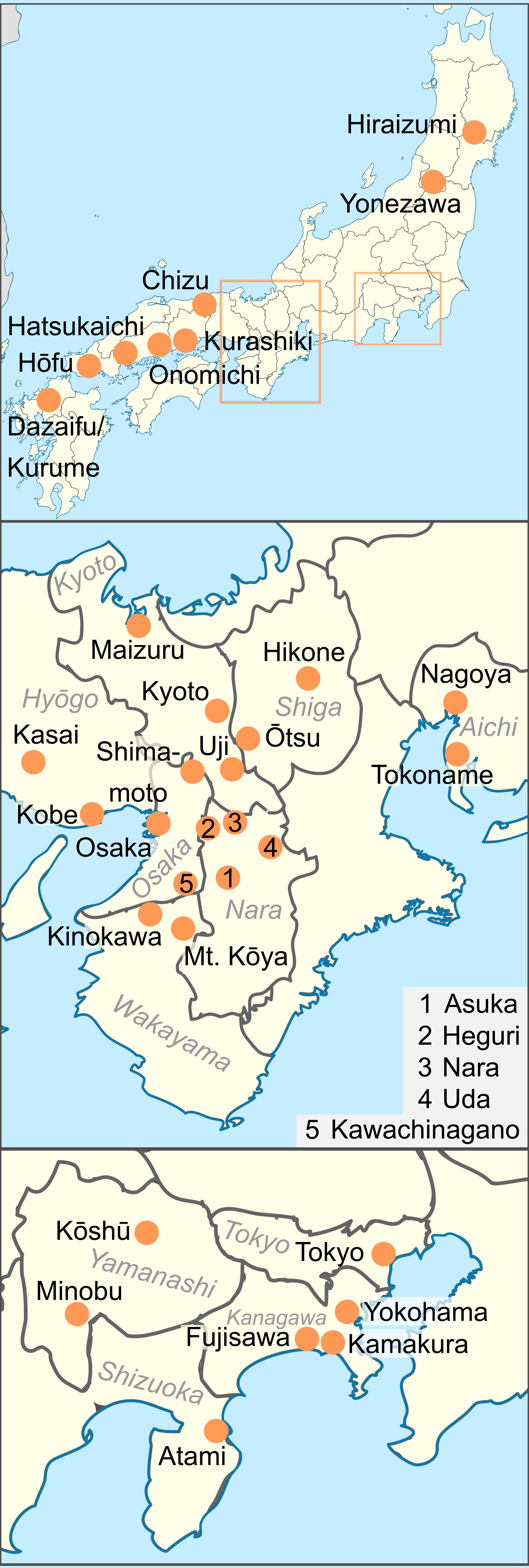
Map showing the location of painting national treasures in Japan

Period	National treasures
Tang dynasty	1 (Note: Several entries in the list date to multiple periods: The Portraits of Seven Shingon Patriarchs (Tang dynasty and Heian period), The Five Abhisambodhi (Tang dynasty and Heian period), Scrolls of Frolicking Animals and Humans (Heian and Kamakura period), The Coming of Amida Buddha and Saints of the Pure Land (Heian and Kamakura period). All of these are counted double in this table. For instance, the National Treasure "Portraits of Seven Shingon Patriarchs" appears twice in this table: under "Tang dynasty" and under "Heian period".)
Asuka period	1
Nara period	5
Heian period	52
Northern Song	3
Southern Song	17
Kamakura period	44
Nanboku-chō period	4
Yuan dynasty	6
Muromachi period	15
Momoyama period	7
Edo period	17

== Usage ==
An overview of what is included in the table and the manner of sorting is as follows: the columns (with the exceptions of Remarks and Pictures) are sortable by pressing the arrows symbols.

- Name: the name as registered in the Database of National Cultural Properties
- Author: the name of the artist and—if applicable—name of the person who added an inscription
- Remarks: detailed location, provenance, general remarks
- Date: period and year; The column entries sort by year. If only a period is known, they sort by the start year of that period.
- Format: primary type of painting, technique and dimensions; The column entries sort by the main type and in some cases further by subcategories: album; byōbu (2 section -> pair or single, 6 section -> pair or single, 8 section -> pair or single); hand scroll (emakimono other); hanging scroll (mandala, portrait, deity, landscape, other); mural; other.
- Present location: "building-name temple/museum/shrine-name town-name prefecture-name"; The column entries sort as "prefecture-name town-name temple/museum/shrine-name building-name".
- Image: picture of the painting, or of a characteristic painting in a group of paintings

== Treasures ==
Name	Author	Remarks	Date	Format	Present location	Image
Buddhist Paradise with Golden Pagoda (紺紙著色金光明最勝王経金字宝塔曼荼羅図, konshichakushoku konkōmyō saishō ōkyō kinji hōtō mandarazu)	—	—	Heian period	Ten hanging scrolls (mandalas), gold paint on indigo blue paper, 139.7 cm × 54.8 cm (55.0 in × 21.6 in)	Chūson-ji, Hiraizumi, Iwate	A painting in portrait format on blue background. The center is occupied by an 11 storied pagoda. An image of a buddha is seen in the lowest story. The pagoda is surrounded by images of people, deities and landscape.
Scenes in and around the capital (紙本金地著色洛中洛外図, shihonkinji chakushoku rakuchū rakugaizu)	Kanō Eitoku	—	Momoyama period, not later than 1574	One pair of six-section folding screens (byōbu), ink and color on paper with gold leaf background, 160.5 cm × 364.5 cm (63.2 in × 143.5 in)	Yonezawa City Uesugi Museum, Yonezawa, Yamagata	A six section folding screen depicting a large number of buildings, people and trees on a gold background. The various elements are disconnected by the gold background which covers the scene like fog.
Kasuga Gongen Genki E (綾本著色春日権現験記絵, kenpon chakushoku kasuga gongen genki e)	Takashina Nakakane (高階隆兼)	—	Kamakura period, 1309	20 hand scrolls (emakimono), color on silk, width: 40.0–41.5 cm (15.7–16.3 in), length: 767.3–1,306.6 cm (302.1–514.4 in)	Museum of the Imperial Collections, Tokyo	A painting with trees and a building with people in courtly dress. The dominating colors are yellow and green.
The Mongol Invasion (紙本著色蒙古襲来絵詞, shihon chakushoku mōko shūrai ekotoba)	—	—	Kamakura period, second half of 13th century	Two hand scrolls (emakimono), color on paper, 39.8 cm × 2,351.8 cm (15.7 in × 925.9 in) and 39.8 cm × 2,013.4 cm (15.7 in × 792.7 in)	Museum of the Imperial Collections, Tokyo	A painting of samurai fighting Mongolian warriors.
Chinese Lions (紙本金地著色唐獅子図, shihonkinji chakushoku karajishi-zu)	Kanō Eitoku	—	Momoyama period, 16th century	A six-section folding screen (byōbu), ink and color on paper with gold leaf background, 223.6 cm × 451.8 cm (88.0 in × 177.9 in)	Museum of the Imperial Collections, Tokyo	Painting of a pair of Chinese lions on a gold background.
Colorful Realm of Living Beings (絹本著色動植綵絵, kenpon chakushoku dōshoku sai-e)	Itō Jakuchū	—	Edo period, ca. 1757--1766	Set of 30 hanging scrolls, color on silk, width: 78.9–80.1 cm (31.1–31.5 in), height: 141.8–143.4 cm (55.8–56.5 in)	Museum of the Imperial Collections, Tokyo	Painting of a white phoenix on an old pine tree. Painting of a rooster and red and white plants.
Illustrated Biography of Prince Shōtoku (綾本著色聖徳太子絵伝, kenpon chakushoku shōtoku taishi eden)	Hata no Chitei (秦致貞)	Originally on fixed doors at Hōryū-ji, later during the Edo period on freestanding screens and in recent times remounted on panels	Heian period, 1069	Ten panels (five pairs), color on figured silk, 189.2–190.5 cm x 137.2–148.2 cm (74.5–75 in x 54–58.3 in)	Tokyo National Museum, Tokyo	A painting on two panels depicting people in courtly dress, buildings, mountains and trees. Part of the color has faded and the dominating colors are brown and green.
Portrait of Takami Senseki (絹本淡彩鷹見泉石像, kenpon tansai Takami Senseki zō)	Watanabe Kazan	—	Edo period, 1837	Hanging scroll, light color on silk, 115.1 cm × 57.1 cm (45.3 in × 22.5 in)	Tokyo National Museum, Tokyo	Portrait of a man with a hat in three-quarter view on beige background. The man is dressed in light-blue garment wearing a sword.
Illustrated Biography of the Priest Ippen： Volume 7 (絹本著色一遍上人絵伝, kenpon chakushoku ippen shōnin eden)	En'i (円伊)	Also known as Ippen Hijiri-e (一遍聖絵)	Kamakura period, 1299	Hand scroll (emakimono), color on silk, 37.8 cm × 802.0 cm (14.9 in × 315.7 in)	Tokyo National Museum, Tokyo	People of various stand, buildings, a wall and ox carts. An island in a lake is comopletely occupied by a canopy under which a large number of people are packed.
Kokūzō Bosatsu (Ākāśagarbha) (絹本著色虚空蔵菩薩像, kenpon chakushoku kokūzō bosatsuzō)	—	Formerly owned by Mitsui Gomei Co.	Heian period, 12th century	Hanging scroll, color on silk, 132.0 cm × 84.4 cm (52.0 in × 33.2 in)	Tokyo National Museum, Tokyo	Frontal view of a deity seated on a pedestal in lotus position embellished with ornaments. The right arm is hanging down supported by the legs with the palm of the right hand facing forward. The left hand is placed in front of the body.
Kujaku Myoo (Mahamayuri) (絹本著色孔雀明王像, kenpon chakushoku kujaku myōōzō)	—	Formerly owned by the Hara family.	Heian period, 12th century	Hanging scroll, color on silk, 147.9 cm × 98.9 cm (58.2 in × 38.9 in)	Tokyo National Museum, Tokyo	Frontal view of a deity with four arms seated on a bird in lotus position embellished with ornaments.
Red and white hibiscuses (絹本著色紅白芙蓉図, kenpon chakushoku kōhaku fuyōzu)	Li Di	—	Southern Song dynasty, 1197	Set of two hanging scrolls, color on silk, each 25.2 cm × 25.5 cm (9.9 in × 10.0 in)	Tokyo National Museum, Tokyo	Two pink hibiscus flowers and leaves on a dark-yellow background. Two white hibiscus flowers and leaves on a dark-yellow background.
Sixteen Arhats (絹本著色十六羅漢像, kenpon chakushoku jūroku rakanzō)	—	Formerly owned by the Shōjuraigō-ji temple.	Heian period, 11th century	Set of 16 hanging scrolls, color on silk, 95.9–97.2 cm x 57.8–52.2 cm (37.8–38.3 cm x 22.8–20.6 cm)	Tokyo National Museum, Tokyo	A priest seated under a tree feeding a four-legged animal in the shape of a small horse.
Senju Kannon (Sahasrabhuja) (絹本著色千手観音像, kenpon chakushoku senjukannonzō)	—	Formerly owned by the Kawasaki family.	Heian period, 12th century	Hanging scroll, color on silk, 138.0 cm × 69.4 cm (54.3 in × 27.3 in)	Tokyo National Museum, Tokyo	Frontal view of a deity with a large number of arms. Small heads and figures are seen above the head of the main figure.
Scenes in and around Kyoto (紙本金地著色洛中洛外図, shihonkinji chakushoku rakuchū rakugaizu)	Iwasa Katsumochi (Matabei)	Known as Funaki version after the Funaki family in whose possession it was handed down	Edo period, 17th century	One pair of six-section folding screens (byōbu), ink and color on paper with gold leaf background, each 162.2 cm × 341.8 cm (63.9 in × 134.6 in)	Tokyo National Museum, Tokyo	A six section folding screen depicting a large number of buildings, people and trees on a gold background. The various elements are disconnected by the gold background which covers the scene like fog.
Pigeon on a peach branch (絹本著色桃鳩図, kenpon chakushoku momohatozu)	Emperor Huizong of Song	—	Northern Song dynasty, 1108 or 1109	Hanging scroll, color on silk, 28.5 cm × 26.1 cm (11.2 in × 10.3 in)	private (Isao Setsu (瀬津勲), Gatōdō (雅陶堂)), Tokyo	Side view of a pigeon seated on a branch with buds and blossoms but without leaves. Seven Chinese characters are located on top of a square red stamp in the top right corner of the painting.
Nachi Falls (絹本著色那智滝図, kenpon chakushoku nachi no taki zu)	—	—	Kamakura period, 13th–14th century	Hanging scroll, color on silk, 160.7 cm × 58.8 cm (63.3 in × 23.1 in)	Nezu Art Museum, Tokyo	A very tall and narrow depiction of a waterfall. There are large trees at the bottom of the fall and small trees at the top of the rock face. The sun (or moon) is half visible behind the rock.
Fugen Bosatsu (Samantabhadra) (絹本著色普賢菩薩像, kenpon chakushoku fugenbosatsuzō)	—	—	Heian period, 12th century	Hanging scroll, color on silk, 159.1 cm × 74.5 cm (62.6 in × 29.3 in)	Tokyo National Museum, Tokyo	A deity seated cross-legged on a pedestal on top of a white elephant.
Apple Blossoms (絹本著色林檎花図, kenpon chakushoku ringo no hana zu)	Attributed to Zhao Chang (趙昌, Chō Shō)	—	Southern Song dynasty	Hanging scroll, color on silk, 23.6 cm × 25.5 cm (9.3 in × 10.0 in)	Hatakeyama Memorial Museum of Fine Art, Tokyo	Blossoms and leaves on a branch painted on an oval background.
Quail (絹本著色鶉図, kenpon chakushoku uzura zu)	Attributed to Li An-Zhong	Marked with the zakkeshitsu-in seal found on Chinese paintings imported to Japan by the Ashikaga	Southern Song dynasty, 12th–13th century	Hanging scroll, color on silk, 24.4 cm × 27.8 cm (9.6 in × 10.9 in)	Nezu Art Museum, Tokyo	A quail in three-quarter view and a shrub on an oval background.
Sakyamuni descending the mountain after asceticism (絹本墨画淡彩出山釈迦図, kenpon bokuga tansai shussan shuka zu) (I) Snowy Landscape (絹本墨画淡彩雪景山水図, kenpon bokuga tansai sekkei sansui zu) (II) Snowy Landscape (絹本墨画淡彩雪景山水図, kenpon bokuga tansai sekkei sansui zu) purportedly by Liang Kai (III)	Liang Kai	"III" was cut later to make the three paintings into a triad likely during the time of Ashikaga Yoshimitsu. Passed down from the Ashikaga shogunate as part of the Higashiyama Treasure. Marked with the zakkeshitsu-in seal found on Chinese paintings imported to Japan by the Ashikaga. Originally designated as three distinct national treasures, they came to be designated as a single national treasure in 2007.	Southern Song dynasty, 13th century	Three hanging scrolls, ink and light color on silk, 110.3 cm × 49.7 cm (43.4 in × 19.6 in) (I), 110.8 cm × 50.1 cm (43.6 in × 19.7 in) (II), 117.6 cm × 52.0 cm (46.3 in × 20.5 in) (III)	Tokyo National Museum, Tokyo	Tall and narrow painting of a landscape with mountains and vegetation. In the bottom left there are two very small horsemen.
Wind and Rain, landscape painting (絹本墨画淡彩風雨山水図, kenpon bokuga tansai fuu sansui zu)	Attributed to Ma Yuan	—	Southern Song dynasty, 13th century	Hanging scroll, ink on silk, 111.0 cm × 55.8 cm (43.7 in × 22.0 in)	Seikadō Bunko Art Museum, Tokyo	Landscape with mountains and trees.
Irises screen (紙本金地著色燕子花図, shihonkinji chakushoku kakitsubata zu)	Ogata Kōrin	Formerly held by the Nishi Honganji, Kyoto.	Edo period, c. 1705	One pair of six-section folding screens (byōbu), ink and color on paper with gold leaf background, each 150.9 cm × 338.8 cm (59.4 in × 133.4 in)	Nezu Art Museum, Tokyo	Irises in blossom on a gold background covering the bottom left half of the screen. Irises in blossom on a gold background covering more than half of the screen.
Painting of the chapters Sekiya and Miotsukushi from The Tale of Genji (紙本金地著色源氏物語関屋及澪標図, shihonkinji chakushoku genji monogatari sekiya oyobi miotsukushi zu)	Tawaraya Sōtatsu	—	Edo period	One pair of six-section folding screens (byōbu), ink and color on paper with gold leaf background, each 152.3 cm × 355.6 cm (60.0 in × 140.0 in)	Seikadō Bunko Art Museum, Tokyo	Landscape with people in court attire with a cart, a tori, a boat and trees. Landscape with people in court attire with an ox-drawn cart, another cart, a fence, a building and hills.
Painting of a Cypress (紙本金地著色桧図, shihonkinji chakushoku hinoki zu)	Kanō Eitoku	—	Momoyama period	Eight-section folding screen (byōbu), ink and color on paper with gold leaf background, 170.0 cm × 461.0 cm (66.9 in × 181.5 in)	Tokyo National Museum, Tokyo	The lower parts of a cypress on a gold background.
Chinese landscape (紙本金地著色楼閣山水図, shihonkinji chakushoku rōkakusan suizu)	Ike no Taiga	—	Edo period, 18th century	One pair of six-section folding screens (byōbu), ink and color on paper with gold leaf background, 168.0 cm × 372.0 cm (66.1 in × 146.5 in)	Tokyo National Museum, Tokyo	Landscape with people, a bridge and a pavilion. Coastal scene with boats, people and mountains.
Imperial Guard Cavalry (紙本淡彩随身庭騎絵巻, shihontansai zuishin teiki emaki)	attributed to Fujiwara Nobuzane	—	Kamakura period, 1247	Hand scroll (emakimono), light color on paper, 28.7 cm × 237.5 cm (11.3 in × 93.5 in)	Okura Museum of Art, Tokyo	Horseman with a holster of arrows on his back seated on a shying horse.
Pine trees in snow (紙本淡彩雪松図, shihontansai yukimatsuzu)	Maruyama Ōkyo	—	Edo period, 1773	One pair of six-section folding screens (byōbu), light color on paper, 155.5 cm × 362.0 cm (61.2 in × 142.5 in)	Mitsui Memorial Museum, Tokyo	Two paintings of pine trees covered with snow
Family enjoying the evening cool (紙本淡彩納涼図, shihontansai nōryōzu)	Kusumi Morikage	—	Edo period, 17th century	A two-section folding screen (byōbu), light color on paper, 149.7 cm × 166.2 cm (58.9 in × 65.4 in)	Tokyo National Museum, Tokyo	Man, woman and child lying and sitting under a pergola looking to the left.
Merry-making under aronia blossoms (紙本著色花下遊楽図, shihon chakushoku kaka yūraku)	Kanō Naganobu	The two middle sections of the right screen were destroyed by fire in the 1923 Great Kantō earthquake.	Momoyama period, 17th century	One pair of six-section folding screens (byōbu), color on paper, 148.8 cm × 357.7 cm (58.6 in × 140.8 in)	Tokyo National Museum, Tokyo	People standing and sitting under a large tree with white blossoms. People engaged in various activities next to a house with engawa and a tree.
Scroll of hungry ghosts (紙本著色餓鬼草紙, shihon chakushoku gakisōshi)	—	—	Heian period, 12th century	Hand scroll (emakimono), color on paper, 26.9 cm × 380.2 cm (10.6 in × 149.7 in)	Tokyo National Museum, Tokyo	People in bright colors and skeletons with hair in dark colors.
Illustrated Sutra of Cause and Effect (紙本著色絵因果経, shihon chakushoku eingakyō)	—	—	Nara period, second half of 8th century	Hand scroll (emakimono), color on paper, 26.5 cm × 1,100.5 cm (10.4 in × 433.3 in)	The University Art Museum, Tokyo University of the Arts, Tokyo	People seated around a Buddha statue and two heavenly beings descending from the sky. The lower part of the painting is covered by Chinese text.
Maple viewers (紙本著色観楓図, shihon chakushoku kanpūzu)	Kanō Hideyori	—	Muromachi period, 16th century	A six-section folding screen (byōbu), color on paper, 150.2 cm × 365.5 cm (59.1 in × 143.9 in)	Tokyo National Museum, Tokyo	Landscape with trees with red leaves, a bridge and people engaged in various activities.
Genji Monogatari Emaki (紙本著色源氏物語絵巻, shihon chakushoku genji monogatari emaki) or The Tale of Genji Scroll	—	Oldest surviving monogatari scroll and oldest non-Buddhist scroll covering chapters 38 (The Bell Cricket (鈴虫, suzumushi)), 39 (Evening Mist (夕霧, yūgiri)) and 40 (Rites (御法, minori)) of the novel.	Heian period, early 12th century	Hand scroll (emakimono) cut into four illustrations and nine pages of text, color on paper, 21.8 cm x (23.4–48.3) cm (8.6 in x (9.2–19) in)	Gotoh Museum, Tokyo	People seated in a house and on an engawa in three-quarter view. One person is playing a flute. Three women and one man seated in a house and on an engawa. The man, inside the house, is keeping a flat object in his hand while a woman approaches him from behind. Two other women are seated just outside the room as if eavesdropping.
Murasaki Shikibu Diary Emaki (紙本著色紫式部日記絵巻, shihon chakushoku Murasaki Shikibu nikki emaki)	attributed to Fujiwara Nobuzane (illustrations) and Kujō Yoshitsune (calligraphy)	—	Kamakura period, 13th century	Hand scroll (emakimono) cut into three illustrations and three pages of text, color on paper, 21.0 cm x (46.4–51.9) cm (8.3 in x (18.3–20.4) in)	Gotoh Museum, Tokyo	People seated on an engawa and in front of a house in three-quarter view.
Fan-paper album of Hokekyō Sutra (紙本著色扇面法華経冊子, shihon chakushoku senmen hokekyō sasshi) volume 8	—	—	Heian period, 12th century	Fan paper in folding book form, 22 pages, color on paper, length 25.5 cm, length of upper chord 26.2 cm	Tokyo National Museum, Tokyo	People engaged in various activities covered by text in Chinese script in a fan-shaped album.
Scroll of the Hells (紙本著色地獄草紙, shihon chakushoku jigoku sōshi)	—	—	Kamakura period, late 12th century	Hand scroll (emakimono), color on paper, 26.9 cm × 249.3 cm (10.6 in × 98.1 in)	Tokyo National Museum, Tokyo	Naked people in a sea of fire and being tormented by burning rocks. To the right of the scene is Japanese handwritten text.
The Tale of Great Minister Ban (紙本著色伴大納言絵詞, shihon chakushoku ban dainagon ekotoba)	Tokiwa Mitsunaga of the Tosa school	—	Kamakura period, late 12th century	Hand scroll (emakimono), color on paper, 30.4 cm × 828.1 cm (12.0 in × 326.0 in)	Idemitsu Museum of Arts, Tokyo	A large group of people.
Heiji Monogatari Emaki (illustrated stories about the Heiji Civil War) (紙本著色平治物語絵詞, shihon chakushoku heiji monogatari ekotoba) or 平治物語絵巻 (heiji monogatari emaki), Vol. of the Removal of Imperial Family to Rokuhara (六波羅行幸巻, rokuhara gyōkō no maki)	attributed to Sumiyoshi Keion	—	Kamakura period, 13th century	Hand scroll (emakimono), color on paper, 42.2 cm × 952.9 cm (16.6 in × 375.2 in)	Tokyo National Museum, Tokyo	An ox-drawn cart surrounded by warriors in front of a gate as if departing. A priest standing in the gate is pointing at the cart.
Evening bell from mist-shrouded temple (紙本墨画煙寺晩鐘図, shihon bokuga enji banshōzu)	attributed to Muqi Fachang	The scene depicted is one of the Eight Views of Xiaoxiang.	Southern Song dynasty	Hanging scroll, ink on paper, 32.3 cm × 103.6 cm (12.7 in × 40.8 in)	Hatakeyama Memorial Museum of Fine Art, Tokyo	Fog-covered landscape.
Portrait of Kanzan (Hanshan) (紙本墨画寒山図, shihon bokuga kanzanzu)	Kaō Ninga	—	Nanboku-chō period, 14th century	Hanging scroll, ink on paper, 85.8 cm × 32.5 cm (33.8 in × 12.8 in)	private collection, Tokyo	Portrait of a man looking to the left with his arms on the back.
Fishing village in the evening glow (紙本墨画漁村夕照図, shihon bokuga gyoson sekishōzu)	attributed to Muqi Fachang	The scene depicted is one of the Eight Views of Xiaoxiang.	Southern Song dynasty, 13th century	Hanging scroll, ink on paper, 33.0 cm × 112.6 cm (13.0 in × 44.3 in)	Nezu Art Museum, Tokyo	Landscape with mountains, trees and boats on the sea.
Landscape (紙本墨画山水図, shihon bokuga sansuizu) or Landscape with ink broken (破墨山水図, haboku sansuizu)	Sesshū Tōyō	With inscriptions by the artist and six poet-monks from Gozan Zen temples in Kyoto	Muromachi period, 1495	Hanging scroll, splashed ink (hatsuboku) on paper, 148.6 cm × 32.7 cm (58.5 in × 12.9 in)	Tokyo National Museum, Tokyo	Landscape with mountains and trees.
Landscapes of autumn and winter (紙本墨画秋冬山水図, shihon bokuga shūtō sansuizu)	Sesshū Tōyō	—	Muromachi period, 15th century	Two hanging scrolls, ink on paper, 47.8 cm × 30.2 cm (18.8 in × 11.9 in)	Tokyo National Museum, Tokyo	Landscape with hills, trees and a house in the background.
Pine Trees (紙本墨画松林図, shihon bokuga shōrinzu) also known as the Pine Trees screen (松林図 屏風, Shōrin-zu byōbu)	Hasegawa Tōhaku	—	Momoyama period, 16th century	One pair of six-section folding screens (byōbu), ink on paper, each 156.8 cm × 356.0 cm (61.7 in × 140.2 in)	Tokyo National Museum, Tokyo	Mist-covered pine trees.
Detached segment of the Deeds of the Zen Masters (紙本墨画禅機図断簡, shihon bokuga zenkizu dankan): Hanshan and Shide (寒山拾得図, kanzan jittokuzu)	Indara (因陀羅) (Yintuoluo) with inscriptions by Chushi Fanqi	—	Yuan dynasty, 14th century	Hand scroll, ink on paper, 35.0 cm × 49.5 cm (13.8 in × 19.5 in)	Tokyo National Museum, Tokyo	Painting separated in two parts by Chinese text running vertically through the centre. The left half is empty, there are two seated people under a tree in the right half.
Detached segment of the Deeds of the Zen Masters (紙本墨画禅機図断簡, shihon bokuga zenkizu dankan): Tanka burning Buddhist statues (丹霞焼仏図, tanka shōbutsuzu)	Indara (因陀羅) (Yintuoluo)	—	Yuan dynasty, 14th century	Hand scroll, ink on paper, 35.0 cm × 36.8 cm (13.8 in × 14.5 in)	Ishibashi Museum of Art, Kurume, Fukuoka	Painting with Chinese text running vertically on the left. There is a person seated on an open fire and another person standing in the right half.
Detached segment of the Deeds of the Zen Masters (紙本墨画禅機図断簡, shihon bokuga zenkizu dankan): Priest Zhichang and courtier Libo (智常・李渤図, chijō ribotsuzu)	Indara (因陀羅) (Yintuoluo)	—	Yuan dynasty, 14th century	Hand scroll, ink on paper, 35.3 cm × 45.1 cm (13.9 in × 17.8 in)	Hatakeyama Memorial Museum of Fine Art, Tokyo	
Detached segment of the Deeds of the Zen Masters (紙本墨画禅機図断簡, shihon bokuga zenkizu dankan): Priest Zhichang (智常禅師図, chijō zenjizu)	Indara (因陀羅) (Yintuoluo)	—	Yuan dynasty, 14th century	Hand scroll, ink on paper, 35.3 cm × 48.3 cm (13.9 in × 19.0 in)	Seikadō Bunko Art Museum, Tokyo	Painting with Chinese text running vertically on the left. There is a person seated under a tree and another person standing in the right half.
Detached segment of the Deeds of the Zen Masters (紙本墨画禅機図断簡, shihon bokuga zenkizu dankan): Budai (Hotei) (布袋図, hoteizu)	Indara (因陀羅) (Yintuoluo)	—	Yuan dynasty, 14th century	Hand scroll, ink on paper, 35.6 cm × 48.5 cm (14.0 in × 19.1 in)	Nezu Art Museum, Tokyo	Painting with Chinese text running vertically on the right. There is a person seated under a tree and another person standing in the left half.
Zhou Maoshu Appreciating Lotuses (紙本墨画淡彩周茂叔愛蓮図, shihon bokuga tansai shū moshuku airenzu)	Kanō Masanobu	—	Muromachi period, 15th century	Hanging scroll, ink and light color on paper, 84.5 cm × 33.0 cm (33.3 in × 13.0 in)	Kyushu National Museum, Dazaifu, Fukuoka	Tall and narrow painting with a tree and a lake covered with lotus flowers in the lower half. A boat with a man is floating on the lake.
Reading in a Bamboo Grove (紙本墨画淡彩竹斎読書図, shihon bokuga tansai chikusaidokushozu)	attributed to Tenshō Shūbun, inscription by Jikuun Tōren and other priests	—	Muromachi period, 1446	Hanging scroll, ink and light color on paper, 136.7 cm × 33.7 cm (53.8 in × 13.3 in)	Tokyo National Museum, Tokyo	Landscape with mountains and trees. In the top left corner there is a Chinese text.
The Sixth Patriarch Huineng carrying a rod across his shoulder (紙本墨画六祖挟担図, shihon bokuga rokuso kyōtanzu)	Zhiweng	—	Southern Song dynasty, 13th century	Hanging scroll, ink on paper, 93.0 cm × 36.4 cm (36.6 in × 14.3 in)	Daitōkyū Memorial Library (大東急記念文庫, daitōkyū kinen bunko) (Gotoh Museum), Tokyo	
Imaginary tour through Xiao-xiang (紙本墨画瀟湘臥遊図, shihon bokuga shōshōgayūzu)	Li (李氏)	—	Southern Song dynasty, 12th century	Scroll, ink on paper, 30.3 cm × 400.4 cm (11.9 in × 157.6 in)	Tokyo National Museum, Tokyo	Coastal landscape with mountains and trees. To the right of the scene there is Chinese text. The scroll is covered by various stamps with red color.
Rishukyō sutra (白描絵料紙理趣経, hakubyōeryōshi rishukyō)	—	Sutra scroll decorated with line under drawings. This work is the first volume of the four volume Konkōmyōkyō Sutra. Volume 3, a national treasure, is also preserved complete while volumes 2 (national treasure) and 4 only exist in fragments.	Kamakura period, 1193	Scroll, hakubyō-style (白描) on paper, 25.0 cm × 450.5 cm (9.8 in × 177.4 in)	Daitōkyū Memorial Library (大東急記念文庫, daitōkyū kinen bunko) (Gotoh Museum), Tokyo	Very faded drawings covered by prominent Chinese text.
Portrait of Lanxi Daolong (Rankei Dōryū) (絹本淡彩蘭溪道隆像, kenpon tansai rankei dōryūzō)	Inscription on the upper part of the scroll is by the subject of the portrait, Lanxi Daolong.	—	Kamakura period, 1271	Hanging scroll, light color on silk, 104.8 cm × 46.4 cm (41.3 in × 18.3 in)	Kamakura Museum of National Treasures, Kamakura, Kanagawa. Owned by Kenchō-ji, Kamakura, Kanagawa	Monk seated on a chair holding a stick-like object in his right hand in three-quarter view. Above the painting there is Chinese text.
Illustrated Biography of the Priest Ippen (絹本著色一遍上人絵伝, kenpon chakushoku ippen shōnin eden)	En'i (円伊)	—	Kamakura period, 1299	Hand scroll (emakimono), color on silk, twelve scrolls, 38.2 cm × 922.8 cm (15.0 in × 363.3 in) (#3), 38.2 cm × 1,094.8 cm (15.0 in × 431.0 in) (#5)	Shōjōkō-ji, Fujisawa, Kanagawa	Horsemen, people and buildings.
Portraits of Kanezawa Sanetoki, Hōjō Akitoki, Kanezawa Sadaaki, Kanezawa Sadayuki (絹本著色北条実時像, 絹本著色北条顕時像, 絹本著色金沢貞顕像, 絹本著色金沢貞将像)	—	Four portraits of members of the Hōjō clan.	Kamakura period	Four hanging scrolls, color on silk, 74.0 cm × 53.1 cm (29.1 in × 20.9 in)	Shōmyō-ji (称名寺), Yokohama, Kanagawa	Seated monk holding a rosary in three-quarter view.
Ten Advantages and Ten Pleasures of Country Life (紙本淡彩十便図, shihon tansai jubenzu) and shihon tansai jugizu (紙本淡彩十宣図) or Album of the Ten Expediencies and the Ten Merits	Ike no Taiga and Yosa Buson	—	Edo period, 1771	Album composed of 10 paintings by Buson and 10 paintings by Taiga, light color on paper, 17.7 cm × 17.7 cm (7.0 in × 7.0 in)	Kawabata Memorial Hall (川端康成記念会), Kamakura, Kanagawa	Three people inside a house. A person in the garden in front of a house.
Taima Mandala engi (紙本著色当麻曼荼羅縁起, shihon chakushoku taima mandara engi)	—	—	Kamakura period	Two hand scrolls (emakimono), color on paper, 51.5 cm × 796.7 cm (20.3 in × 313.7 in) and 51.5 cm × 689.8 cm (20.3 in × 271.6 in)	Kamakura Museum of National Treasures, Kamakura, Kanagawa. Owner: Kōmyō-ji, Kamakura, Kanagawa	People and horses outside a wall with a gate. Beyond the gate there is a house with people. A deity with many attendants approaches a house with people.
Snow Sifted Through Frozen Clouds (紙本墨画凍雪篩雲図, shihon bokuga tōunshisetsuzu)	Uragami Gyokudō	—	Edo period, early 19th century	Hanging scroll, ink on paper, 133.3 cm × 56.6 cm (52.5 in × 22.3 in)	Kawabata Memorial Hall (川端康成記念会), Kamakura, Kanagawa	Landscape with mountains and trees.
Summer Mountain (絹本著色夏景山水図, kenpon chakushoku kakei sansui-zu)	attributed to Hu Zhifu	—	Southern Song dynasty, 13th century	Hanging scroll, color on silk, 118.5 cm × 52.7 cm (46.7 in × 20.7 in)	Kuon-ji, Minobu, Yamanashi	Landscape with a mountain, tree and a person carrying a stick.
Daruma (絹本著色達磨図, kenpon chakushoku darumazu)	inscription by Lanxi Daolong (Rankei Dōryū)	—	Kamakura period, 1260s	Hanging scroll, ink on paper, 123.3 cm × 61.2 cm (48.5 in × 24.1 in)	Kogaku-ji, Kōshū, Yamanashi	A seated monk in a red robe.
Five Guardian Kings (絹本著色五大尊像, kenpon chakushoku godai sonzō)	—	—	Heian period, October 10, 1088 (Trailokavijaya), June 1, 1090 (Kuṇḍali)	Five hanging scrolls, color on silk, 140.8 cm × 88 cm (55.4 in × 34.6 in) (Daiitoku) and 138 cm × 88 cm (54 in × 35 in) (Fudō Myōō, Gosanze, Gundari, Ucchusma)	Nara National Museum, Nara, Nara. Owned by Kiburi-ji, Ōno, Gifu	A deity with many heads and arms surrounded by other smaller figures.
Red and White Plum Blossoms (紙本金地著色紅白梅図, shihonkinjichakushoku kōhakubaizu)	Ogata Kōrin	—	Edo period, 18th century	One pair of two-section folding screens (byōbu), ink and color on paper, each 156.0 cm × 172.2 cm (61.4 in × 67.8 in)	MOA Museum of Art, Atami, Shizuoka.	A tree branch with white blossoms and a river.
Genji Monogatari Emaki (紙本著色源氏物語絵巻, shihon chakushoku genji monogatari emaki) or The Tale of Genji Scroll	—	—	Heian period, early 12th century	Hand scroll (emakimono) with 15 illustrations and 38 pages of text, color on paper	Tokugawa Art Museum, Nagoya, Aichi	Women and a man in courtly dress sitting. People in courtly dress sitting on the floor of a house.
Huike Offering His Arm to Bodhidharma (紙本墨画淡彩慧可断臂図, shihon bokuga tansai eka danpizu)	Sesshū Tōyō	—	Muromachi period, 1496	Hanging scroll, ink and light color on paper, 199.9 cm × 113.6 cm (78.7 in × 44.7 in)	Sainen-ji (斉年寺), Tokoname, Aichi	One sitting priest and top half of one standing priest.
Fudō Myōō (Acala) (絹本著色不動明王像, kenpon chakushoku fudō myōōzō) (Yellow Fudō (黄不動, kifudōson))	—	—	Heian period	Hanging scroll, color on silk, 178.2 cm × 72.1 cm (70.2 in × 28.4 in)	Mii-dera, Ōtsu, Shiga	Frontal portrait of a frightening deity dressed only in a skirt-like garment holding a sword in his right hand.
The six paths (絹本著色六道絵, kenpon chakushoku rokudōe)	—	—	Kamakura period, 13th century	15 scrolls, color on silk, 155.6 cm × 68.8 cm (61.3 in × 27.1 in)	Shōju Raigō-ji (聖衆来迎寺), Ōtsu, Shiga	Figures within a sea of fire.
Genre scene (紙本金地著色風俗図, shihonkinji chakushoku fūzokuzu) or Hikone Screen (彦根屏風, hikone byōbu)	—	Formerly held by the Ii family	Edo period, first half of 17th century	Six-section folding screen (byōbu), color on paper with gold leaf background, 94.5 cm × 278.8 cm (37.2 in × 109.8 in)	Hikone Castle Museum, Hikone, Shiga	People engaged in various activities: playing music, talking.
The Five Abhisambodhi (紙本墨画五部心観, shihonbokuga gobu shinkan)	unknown	Brought to Japan from China by Enchin.	Heian period (incomplete scroll); late Tang dynasty, 9th century (complete scroll)	Two hand scrolls with iconographic line drawings, one complete and one with part of the first half missing, ink on paper, 30.0 cm × 1,796 cm (11.8 in × 707.1 in)	Mii-dera, Ōtsu, Shiga	A seated priest holding an incense burner. Seated deities and religious symbols.
Raigo of Amida (Amitābha) and Twenty-five Attendants (絹本著色阿弥陀二十五菩薩来迎図, kenpon chakushoku nijūgo bosatsu raigōzu) (Rapid Descent)	—	—	Kamakura period, 13th–14th century	Hanging scroll, color on silk, 145.1 cm × 154.5 cm (57.1 in × 60.8 in)	Chion-in, Kyoto	A deity with a large number of attendants descending over mountains towards a house.
Five Guardian Kings (絹本著色五大尊像, kenpon chakushoku godai sonzō)	—	—	Kamakura period	Five hanging scrolls, color on silk, 193.9 cm × 126.2 cm (76.3 in × 49.7 in)	Daigo-ji, Kyoto	A deity surrounded by fire and two other figures.
Five Guardian Kings (絹本著色五大尊像, kenpon chakushoku godai sonzō)	—	—	Heian period	Five hanging scrolls, color on silk, 153.0 cm × 128.8 cm (60.2 in × 50.7 in)	Tō-ji, Kyoto	
Peacock Myōō (Mayura Vidyaraja) (絹本著色孔雀明王像, kenpon chakushoku kujaku myōōzō)	—	—	Northern Song dynasty, 11th century	Hanging scroll, color on silk, 167.1 cm × 102.6 cm (65.8 in × 40.4 in)	Ninna-ji, Kyoto	Frontal view of a deity with six arms seated on a peacock.
Amida (Amitābha) coming over the Mountain (絹本著色山越阿弥陀図, kenpon chakushoku yamagoeamidazu)	—	—	Kamakura period, 13th century	Hanging scroll, color on silk, 120.6 cm × 80.3 cm (47.5 in × 31.6 in)	Kyoto National Museum, Kyoto	Deity and six attendants coming over a mountain pass towards the viewer.
Descent of Amitabha over the Mountain (絹本著色山越阿弥陀図, kenpon chakushoku yamagoeamidazu)	—	—	Kamakura period, 13th century	Hanging scroll, color on silk, 138.0 cm × 118.0 cm (54.3 in × 46.5 in)	Eikan-dō Zenrin-ji, Kyoto	Deity and attendants coming over a mountain pass towards the viewer.
Landscape screen (絹本著色山水屏風, sansuibyōbu)	—	—	early Kamakura period, 13th century	Six-section folding screen (byōbu), color on silk, 110.8 cm × 37.5 cm (43.6 in × 14.8 in)	Jingo-ji, Kyoto	Landscape with buildings and mountains on a six-section folding screen
Landscape screen (絹本著色山水屏風, senzuibyōbu)	—	Only extant screen painting from the Heian period. Formerly at Tō-ji	Heian period, 11th century	Six-section folding screen (byōbu), color on silk, 146.4 cm × 42.7 cm (57.6 in × 16.8 in)	Kyoto National Museum, Kyoto	Six narrow and tall panels of a landscape with mountains, trees, horsemen and a hut. The painting is slightly faded.
Shaka rising from the Gold Coffin (絹本著色釈迦金棺出現図, kenpon chakushoku shaka kinkan shutsugenzu)	—	—	late Heian period, 11th century	Hanging scroll, color on silk, 160.0 cm × 229.5 cm (63.0 in × 90.4 in)	Kyoto National Museum, Kyoto	The Buddha surrounded by a halo and a large number of priests and other figures.
Shaka nyorai (Sakya Tathāgata) (絹本著色釈迦如来像, kenpon chakushoku shaka nyoraizō) or Red Shakyamuni (赤釈迦, aka shaka)	—	—	late Heian period, 12th century	Hanging scroll, color on silk, 159.4 cm × 85.5 cm (62.8 in × 33.7 in)	Jingo-ji, Kyoto	Frontal view of a deity seated cross-legged on a pedestal.
Autumn and Winter Landscapes (絹本著色秋景冬景山水図, kenpon chakushoku shūkei tōkei sansuizu)	attributed to Emperor Huizong of Song	—	Southern Song dynasty, 12th century	Two hanging scrolls, color on silk, each 128.2 cm × 55.2 cm (50.5 in × 21.7 in)	Konchi-in, Kyoto	Landscape with a priest on a mountain road.
Oxen (絹本著色秋野牧牛図, kenpon chakushoku shūyabokugyūzu)	attributed to Yan Ciping (閻次平, en jihei)	—	Southern Song dynasty, late 12th century	Hanging scroll, color on silk, 97.5 cm × 50.6 cm (38.4 in × 19.9 in)	Sen-oku Hakuko Kan, Kyoto	Two boys, an ox and a small ox under a tree.
Twelve Devas (絹本著色十二天像, kenpon chakushoku jūnitenzō)	—	Formerly owned by Tō-ji.	late Heian period, 1127	Twelve hanging scrolls, color on silk, each 144.0 cm × 127.0 cm (56.7 in × 50.0 in)	Kyoto National Museum, Kyoto	Frontal view of a seated figure with halo flanked by two small figures.
Twelve Devas screen (絹本著色十二天像, kenpon chakushoku jūnitenzō)	attributed to Takuma Shōga (宅間勝賀)	—	late Heian period, 1191	Pair of six-section folding screens (byōbu), color on paper, each 130.0 cm × 42.1 cm (51.2 in × 16.6 in)	Tō-ji, Kyoto	Four deities on four sections of a folding screen. Two of them are female and dressed in robes. The other two are male and only sparely dressed. All four have halos with flames.
Sixteen Arhats (絹本著色十六羅漢像, kenpon chakushoku jūroku rakanzō)	—	—	Northern Song dynasty, 12th century	16 hanging scrolls, color on silk, 82.1 cm × 36.4 cm (32.3 in × 14.3 in) (Pindolabaradvāja)	Seiryō-ji, Kyoto	
Portrait of Daitō Kokushi (Shūhō Myōchō) (絹本著色大燈国師像, kenpon chakushoku daitō kokushizō)	—	—	Nanboku-chō period, 1334	Hanging scroll, color on silk, 115.5 cm × 56.5 cm (45.5 in × 22.2 in)	Daitoku-ji, Kyoto	Priest seated on a chair holding a stick-like object in his hand.
Three portraits in Jingo-ji (絹本著色神護寺三像, kenpon chakushoku jingoji sanzō) said to be those of Minamoto no Yoritomo (源賴朝), Taira no Shigemori (平重盛), Fujiwara no Mitsuyoshi (藤原光能)	attributed to Fujiwara Takanobu	—	Kamakura period, 13th century	Three hanging scrolls, color on silk, 143.0 cm × 112.8 cm (56.3 in × 44.4 in) (Yoritomo), 143.0 cm × 111.2 cm (56.3 in × 43.8 in) (Shigemori) and 143.0 cm × 111.6 cm (56.3 in × 43.9 in) (Mitsuyoshi)	Jingo-ji, Kyoto	Portrait in three-quarter view of a person seated on the floor in courtly attire carrying a stick like object.
Fudō Myōō (Acala) (絹本著色不動明王像, kenpon chakushoku fudō myōōzō) (Yellow Fudō (黄不動, kifudōson))	—	—	Heian period, 12th century	Hanging scroll, color on silk, 168.2 cm × 80.3 cm (66.2 in × 31.6 in)	Manshu-in, Kyoto	Frontal portrait of a frightening deity dressed only in a skirt-like garment holding a sword in his right hand.
Fudō Myōō (Acala) and two attendants (絹本著色不動明王二童子像, kenpon chakushoku fudō myōō nidōjizō) (Blue Fudō (青不動, aofudōson))	—	—	Heian period, mid 11th century	Hanging scroll, color on silk, 203.3 cm × 148.5 cm (80.0 in × 58.5 in)	Shōren-in, Kyoto	A deity with blue skin color seated on a pedestal and surrounded by flames. Two smaller figures are standing in the lower left and right corners.
Fugen Enmei (Samantabhadra) (絹本著色普賢延命像, kenpon chakushoku fugen enmeizō)	—	—	Heian period, 12th century	Hanging scroll, color on silk, 139.4 cm × 67.0 cm (54.9 in × 26.4 in)	Matsunoo-dera, Maizuru, Kyoto	Frontal view of a deity seated on a three-headed white elephant.
Butsugen Butsumo (絹本著色仏眼仏母像, kenpon chakushoku butsugen butsumozō)	—	—	early Kamakura period, end of 12th century	Hanging scroll, color on silk, 193.1 cm × 128.8 cm (76.0 in × 50.7 in)	Kōzan-ji, Kyoto	Frontal view of a deity seated on a pedestal.
Monju crossing the sea (絹本著色文殊渡海図, kenpon chakushoku monju tokaizu)	—	—	Kamakura period	Hanging scroll, color on silk, 143.0 cm × 106.4 cm (56.3 in × 41.9 in)	Daigo-ji, Kyoto	A deity seated cross-legged on a pedestal located on top of a lion-shaped animal surrounded by other figures in priest and warrior robes. The whole group rests on clouds over water.
Portrait of Wuzhun Shifan (絹本著色無準師範像, kenpon chakushoku Bujun Shibanzō)	unknown	Wuzhun Shifan (1177–1249) (alt reading: Mujun Shihan, ch: Wuqun Shifan) was a Chinese zen priest.	Southern Song dynasty, 1238	Hanging scroll, color on silk, 124.8 cm × 55.2 cm (49.1 in × 21.7 in)	Tōfuku-ji, Kyoto	Portrait of a priest sitting on a chair and holding a stick-like object. His shoes are placed on a small pedestal in front of him.
Gohyaku Rakan (五百羅漢図 (明兆筆, 二幅狩野孝信補写), gohyaku rakanzu) (Note: Attached to this designation is a Gohyaku Rakan e-hon containing 50 scrolls.)	Kichizan Minchō (吉山明兆, Kitsusan Minchō) (45 scrolls) and later copies by Kanō Takanobu (two scrolls)	Oldest existing paintings of their kind in Japan	Nanboku-chō period, 1386	Hanging scroll, color on silk, 173.6 cm × 89.3 cm (68.3 in × 35.2 in)	Tōfuku-ji, Kyoto	
The monk Myōe (絹本著色明恵上人像, kenpon chakushoku Myōe Shōninzō)	—	—	Kamakura period, 13th century	Hanging scroll, color on silk, 145.0 cm × 59.0 cm (57.1 in × 23.2 in)	Kōzan-ji, Kyoto	A priest seated on a branch of a pine tree in a pine tree forest.
Mandala of the Two Realms (絹本著色両界曼荼羅図, kenpon chakushoku ryōkaimandarazu) or Den shingon-in mandala (伝真言院曼荼羅)	—	—	Heian period, 9th century	Two hanging scrolls (mandalas), color on silk, 185.1 cm × 164.3 cm (72.9 in × 64.7 in) (Garbhadhātu) and 187.1 cm × 164.3 cm (73.7 in × 64.7 in) (Vajradhātu)	Tō-ji, Kyoto	3x3 squares with depictions of deities. The center square in the top has one large deity. Those to either side in the top row have each about 10 deities of intermediate size. The remaining six squares have a large number of small deities arranged in geometric fashion. Geometric arrangement of a large number of deities.
Portraits of Seven Shingon Patriarchs (絹本著色真言七祖像, kenpon chakushoku shingon shichisozō)	Painting by Li Zhen; inscriptions attributed to Kūkai and possibly Emperor Saga	Five portraits were brought back by Kūkai from his trip to Tang dynasty China in 805. Two portraits (of Ryūmō (竜猛) and Ryūchi (竜智)) were added later, in 821, in Japan.	Tang dynasty and Heian period	Seven hanging scrolls, color on silk	Tō-ji, Kyoto	A priest seated on a pedestal in three-quarter view.
Kariteimo (絹本著色訶梨帝母像, kenpon chakushoku kariteimozō)	—	—	Kamakura period	Hanging scroll, color on silk, 124.3 cm × 77.9 cm (48.9 in × 30.7 in)	Daigo-ji, Kyoto	A female deity.
Enmaten (絹本著色閻魔天像, kenpon chakushoku enmatenzō)	—	—	Kamakura period, 12th century	Hanging scroll, color on silk, 129.1 cm × 65.4 cm (50.8 in × 25.7 in)	Daigo-ji, Kyoto	A female deity.
Landscape (絹本墨画山水図, kenpon bokuga sansuizu)	Ri Tō (李唐) (Li Tang)	—	Southern Song dynasty	Two hanging scrolls, ink on silk, 98.1 cm × 43.4 cm (38.6 in × 17.1 in)	Kōtō-in, Kyoto	
Guanyin, Monkeys, and Crane (絹本墨画淡彩観音猿鶴図, kenpon bokuga tansai kannon enkakuzu)	Muqi Fachang	—	Southern Song dynasty, 13th century	Three hanging scrolls, ink and light color on silk, 172.4 cm × 98.8 cm (67.9 in × 38.9 in) (Kannon), 173.9 cm × 98.8 cm (68.5 in × 38.9 in) (monkeys and crane, each)	Daitoku-ji, Kyoto	Triptych with a crane on the left, a cross-legged seated deity in the middle and a pair of monkeys on a tree branch on the right.
Paintings in five-storied pagoda (五重塔初重壁画, gojūnotō shojūhekiga)	—	The paintings covered every interior surface of the first floor of the pagoda. About half of the original paintings remain. They are located on pillars, window shutters, doors, wainscoting and so on. Motifs include deities from the Mandala of the Two Realms and portraits of seven of the eight Shingon patriarchs (Zenmui (善無畏) is missing).	Heian period, 951	Paintings, 18 panels, ink, color and gold on wood	first floor of five-storied pagoda, Daigo-ji, Kyoto	Frontal view of a cross-legged seated deity.
Pine tree and flowering plants (紙本金地著色松に草花図, shihon kinji chakushoku matsu ni kusabanazu)	Hasegawa Tōhaku	—	Momoyama period	One pair of two-section folding screens (byōbu), ink and color on paper with gold leaf background, 226.2 cm × 165.7 cm (89.1 in × 65.2 in) each	Chishaku-in, Kyoto	
Pictures on room partitions: (a) Pine tree and flowering plants (松に草花図, matsu ni kusabanazu), (b) Cherry and maple trees (桜楓図), (c) Pine and plum trees (松に梅図, matsu ni ume zu), (d) Pine tree, sunset hibiscus and chrysanthemum (松に黄蜀葵及菊図)	attributed to Hasegawa Tōhaku and his son	Paintings on walls and sliding doors of the Great drawing room (大書院, daishoin) of Chishaku-in. (a) four paintings on alcove and two paintings on wall, (b) nine paintings on wall and two paintings on fusuma, (c) four paintings on fusuma, (d) four paintings on alcove.	Momoyama period	Paintings, ink and color on paper with gold leaf background	Chishaku-in, Kyoto	Part of a tree with leaves, red blossoms and white blossoms.
Wind god and Thunder God (紙本金地著色風神雷神図, shihon kinji chakushoku fūjin raijinzu)	Tawaraya Sōtatsu	Replicated in works by Sakai Hōitsu and Ogata Kōrin.	Edo period, 17th century	One pair of two-section folding screens (byōbu), ink and color on paper with gold leaf background, each 169.8 cm × 154.5 cm (66.9 in × 60.8 in)	Kennin-ji, Kyoto	Two deities in the top left and right corners wearing a skirt-like garment. The one on the left has a white skin color, the one on the right is green.
Portrait of Emperor Hanazono (紙本著色花園天皇像, shihon chakushoku Hanazono tennōzō)	Gōshin (豪信)	—	Nanboku-chō period, 1338	Hanging scroll, color on paper, 31.2 cm × 97.3 cm (12.3 in × 38.3 in)	Chōfuku-ji, Kyoto	Three-quarter view of a seated man in a wide robe holding a stick like object. On the left there are three lines of text in Chinese script.
History of the Kegon Sect (紙本著色華厳宗祖師絵伝, shihon chakushoku Kegonshū soshi eden) or Kegon engi (華厳縁起)	—	—	Kamakura period, 13th century	Six hand scrolls (emakimono), color on paper, each width: 31.5 cm (12.5 in), lengths of vol. 1/2/3/4/5/6: 1583.0/1219.0/154.5/1420.0/1531.0/865.0 cm (623.2/479.9/60.8/559.1/602.8/340.6 in)	Kōzan-ji, Kyoto	A sailing boat with people and a dragon in the sea.
Scroll of hungry ghosts (紙本著色餓鬼草紙, shihon chakushoku gakisōshi)	—	—	Heian period, late 12th century	Hand scroll (emakimono), color on paper, 26.8 cm × 538.4 cm (10.6 in × 212.0 in)	Kyoto National Museum, Kyoto	People pouring water on a funerary marker surrounded by ghosts.
Illustrated Sutra of Cause and Effect (紙本著色絵因果経, shihon chakushoku eingakyō)	—	—	Nara period, 8th century	Hand scroll (emakimono), color on paper, 26.4 cm × 1,036.4 cm (10.4 in × 408.0 in)	Jōban Rendai-ji (上品蓮台寺), Kyoto	Three seated people shooting bows from a roofed platform and five bystanders. The lower half is covered with Chinese text.
Illustrated Sutra of Cause and Effect (紙本著色絵因果経, shihon chakushoku eingakyō)	—	—	Nara period, 8th century	Hand scroll (emakimono), color on paper, 26.4 cm × 1,536.4 cm (10.4 in × 604.9 in)	Hōon-in, Daigo-ji, Kyoto	
Diseases and Deformities (紙本著色病草紙, shihon chakushoku yamai no sōshi)	—	—	late Heian period, 12th century	Hand scroll (emakimono) cut into 10 sections, color on paper, (25.9–26.0) cm x (25.3–49.3) cm (10.2 in x (10–19.4) in)	Kyoto National Museum, Kyoto	A man suffering from diarrhea squatting with a woman watching his back.
The illustrated biography of priest Hōnen (紙本著色法然上人絵伝)	—	—	Kamakura period, 14th century	Hand scroll (emakimono), illustrated biographies of famous priests (高僧伝絵, kousōdene), 48 volumes, color on paper, ca. 33.0 cm × 1,100 cm (13.0 in × 433.1 in)	Chion-in, Kyoto	People inside and outside of a house. People seated on the floor of a house with folding screens and a garden in the back.
History of Kitano Tenjin (紙本著色北野天神縁起, shihon chakushoku kitano tenjin engi)	—	Biography and catalogue of miracles performed by Sugawara no Michizane, the founder of Kitano Tenman-gū.	Kamakura period, 1219	Eight large hand scrolls (emakimono), color on paper, 52.2 cm x (842–1211) cm (20.6 in x (331–477) in)	Kitano Tenman-gū, Kyoto	Two paintings, upper shows people inside a house and in the garden in front of the house. The lower shows people inside a house and a deity surrounded by blue smoke.
Landscape: Keiin shōchiku (紙本墨画渓陰小築図, shihon bokuga keiin shōchikuzu) or Cottage by a mountain stream	attributed to Kichizan Minchō (吉山明兆, Kitsusan Minchō) with inscriptions by Taihaku Shingen and other priests	—	Muromachi period, 1413	Hanging scroll, ink on paper, 101.5 cm × 34.5 cm (40.0 in × 13.6 in)	Konchi-in, Kyoto	Landscape with mountains, a stream, trees and a hut.
Portrait of Shinran Shōnin (紙本墨画親鸞聖人像, shihon bokuga Shinran Shōninzō) or Mirror portrait	—	Standing portrait of the founder of the Jodo Shinshu school of Pure Land Buddhism.	Kamakura period, possibly the last year of Shinran's life	Hanging scroll, ink on paper, 35.2 cm × 33 cm (13.9 in × 13.0 in) (painting only)	Nishi Honganji, Kyoto	
View of Amanohashidate (紙本墨画淡彩天橋立図, shihon bokuga tansai ama no hashidatezu)	Sesshū Tōyō	Bird's eye view of Amanohashidate.	Muromachi period, 1501–1506	Hanging scroll, ink and light color on paper, 90.0 cm × 178.2 cm (35.4 in × 70.2 in)	Kyoto National Museum, Kyoto	Coastal landscape with mountains, buildings and a very narrow strip of land which is covered by trees.
Catching catfish with a gourd (紙本墨画淡彩瓢鮎図, shihon bokuga tansai hyōnenzu)	Josetsu	Commissioned by shōgun Ashikaga Yoshimochi. On the top of the scroll there is an inscription by Gyokuen Bunpō (玉畹梵芳) and 30 other priests.	1413Muromachi period, 1413	Hanging scroll, ink and light color on paper, 111.5 cm × 75.8 cm (43.9 in × 29.8 in)	Taizō-in (Myōshin-ji), Kyoto	A man holding a gourd next to a river with a fish.
Scrolls of Frolicking Animals and Humans (紙本墨画鳥獣人物戯画, shihon bokuga chōjū-jinbutsu-giga) or Scrolls of Frolicking Animals (鳥獣戯画, chōjū-giga)	maybe Toba Sōjō	Credited as the oldest work of manga.	Heian period and Kamakura period, mid 12th century (1st and 2nd scroll), 13th century (3rd and 4th scroll)	Four hand scrolls (emakimono), ink on paper, up to 30 cm × 1,100 cm (12 in × 433 in)	Kyoto National Museum and Tokyo National Museum, owned by Kōzan-ji, Kyoto	Four frogs and a rabbit in human shape frolicking.
Water fowl in the lotus pond (紙本墨画蓮池水禽図, shihon bokuga renchi suikinzu)	Tawaraya Sōtatsu	—	Edo period, early 17th century	Hanging scroll, ink on paper, 116.0 cm × 50.0 cm (45.7 in × 19.7 in)	Kyoto National Museum, Kyoto	Two birds swimming in a pond with lotus flowers.
Mandala of the Two Realms (紫綾金銀泥絵両界曼荼羅図, murasaki aya kingindei ryōkaimandarazu) or Takao mandala (高雄曼荼羅)	—	Oldest extant example of a Mandala of the Two Worlds in Japan, believed to be a faithful copy of the mandalas that Kūkai brought from Japan	Heian period, 829–833	Two hanging scrolls (mandalas), gold and silver on dark bluish purple damask, 411.0 cm × 366.5 cm (161.8 in × 144.3 in) (Diamond Realm Mandala), 446.4 cm × 406.3 cm (175.7 in × 160.0 in) (Womb Realm Mandala)	Jingo-ji, Kyoto	
Konkōmyōkyō Sutra (白描絵料紙墨書金光明経, hakubyōeryōshi bokusho konkōmyōkyō) vol. 3	—	Sutra scroll decorated with line under drawings possibly showing the Tale of Genji or "Parting at dawn" (Ariake no wakare). Together with the Rishukyō sutra (national treasure) this work is part of the four volume Konkōmyōkyō Sutra. Volumes 2 (national treasure) and 4 only exist in fragments.	Kamakura period, 1192	Hand scroll, color on paper, hakubyō-style (白描), 25.0 cm × 827.0 cm (9.8 in × 325.6 in)	Kyoto National Museum, Kyoto	Text in Chinese script on lined paper with underlying drawings.
Paintings on room partitions in the abbot's quarters (hōjō) (方丈障壁画, hōjō shōhekiga): (a) Birds and flowers of the four seasons (紙本墨画花鳥図, shihon bokuga kachōzu), (b) Four Accomplishment or Four elegant pastimes: Music, Go, Calligraphy and Painting (紙本墨画淡彩琴棋書画図, shihon bokuga tansai kinki shogazu), (c) Eight Views of Xiaoxiang (紙本墨画瀟湘八景図, shihon bokuga shōshō hakkeizu), (d) shihon bokuga chikko yūenzu (紙本墨画竹虎遊猿図)	Kanō Eitoku and his father Kanō Shōei (狩野松栄)	—	Muromachi period, 16th century	38 paintings on fusuma and wall panels of the abbot's quarters (方丈, hōjō) at Jukō-in, sub-temple of Daitoku-ji. (a) 16 panels on fusuma in ritual room (室中), ink on paper (b) eight panels on fusuma in upper second room (上二之間), ink and light color on paper (c) eight panels on fusuma in lower second room (下二之間), ink on paper (d) two panels on wall, four panels on fusuma in upper first room (上一之間), ink on paper	Jukō-in (Daitoku-ji), Kyoto	A stream with floating birds next to a flowering tree.
Amida Trinity (絹本著色阿弥陀三尊像, kenpon chakushoku amida sansonzō)	Fuetsu (普悦)	Marked with Fuetsu's seal on each of the three parts	Southern Song dynasty	Three hanging scrolls, colors on silk; Amida: 125.5 cm × 48.5 cm (49.4 in × 19.1 in), Kannon: 127.5 cm × 48.8 cm (50.2 in × 19.2 in), Seishi: 127.2 cm × 48.5 cm (50.1 in × 19.1 in),	Kyoto National Museum, Kyoto. Owner: Shōjōke-in, Kyoto	A red robed deity flanked by two attendants.
Paintings in the Phoenix Hall (鳳凰堂中堂壁扉画, hōō-dō chū-dō hekihiga): (a) The nine possible levels of birth into Amida's Paradise (九品来迎図, kubon raigōzu), (b) (日想観図), (c) Wall painting (本尊後壁画, honzonkō hekiga)	—	—	Heian period, 1053	14 paintings, color on wood: (a) eight former door paintings and three murals, (b) two door paintings, (c) one painting on the wall behind the principal image of Buddha	Phoenix Hall (Byōdō-in), Uji, Kyoto	Frontal view of a deity. Landscape with hills, trees and horses.
Divinely inspired Reception of the Two Great Sutras (絹本著色両部大経感得図, kenpon chakushoku ryōbutai kyōkantokuzu): (a) zenmui (善無畏), (b) ryūmyō (龍猛)	attributed to Fujiwara no Munehiro (藤原宗弘)	—	Heian period, 1136	Two hanging scrolls, color on silk, 177.8 cm × 141.8 cm (70.0 in × 55.8 in)	Fujita Art Museum, Osaka	A small pagoda with a monk at the entrance in a landscape. A five-storied pagoda in a landscape with hills and trees. Three people are sitting close to the pagoda on the ground.
Konkōmyōkyō Sutra (物語下絵料紙金光明経, monogatari shitae ryōshi konkōmyōkyō) vol. 2	—	Sutra scroll decorated with line under drawings depicting figures of among others aristorcrats and monks. This work is the second volume of the four volume Konkōmyōkyō Sutra. Volumes 1 and 3 are national treasures and preserved complete while volumes 2 and 4 only exist in fragments. Out of the four volumes this scroll contains the most narrative scenes.	Kamakura period, 1192	Scroll, narrative shita-e (下絵) paper, 25.7 cm × 753.6 cm (10.1 in × 296.7 in)	Osaka City Museum of Fine Arts, Osaka	
Illustrated hand scroll of the Monk Zuanzang (Genjō Sanzō) (紙本著色玄奘三蔵絵, shihon chakushoku Genjō Sanzōe)	Fujiwara Takaaki	—	Kamakura period, 12th century	Twelve hand scrolls (emakimono), color on p aper, 40.3 cm x (1200–1920) cm (15.9 in x (472.4–755.9) in)	Fujita Art Museum, Osaka	Horses laden with packages being led towards a gate. Their path is lined with monks.
Landscape of the four seasons (紙本著色日月四季山水図, shihon chakushoku jitsugetsu shiki sansui-zu)	—	—	Muromachi period, mid-16th century	One pair of six-section folding screens (byōbu), ink and color on paper with gold leaf background, 147.0 cm × 313.5 cm (57.9 in × 123.4 in)	Kongō-ji, Kawachinagano, Osaka	Six section folding screen with landscape painting in gold, brown green and white colors. Six section folding screen with landscape painting in gold, brown and green colors.
Portrait of Emperor Go-Toba (紙本著色後鳥羽天皇像, shihon chakushoku Go-Toba-tennōzō)	attributed to Fujiwara Nobuzane	—	Kamakura period, 1221	Hanging scroll, color on paper, 40.3 cm × 30.6 cm (15.9 in × 12.0 in)	Minase Shrine, Shimamoto, Osaka	Portrait of a man in courtly dress seated on the floor in three-quarter view.
Murasaki Shikibu Diary Ekotoba (紙本著色紫式部日記絵詞, shihon chakushoku Murasaki Shikibu nikki ekotoba)	unknown	—	Kamakura period, 13th century	Hand scroll (emakimono), color on paper, 21.0 cm × 434.0 cm (8.3 in × 170.9 in)	Fujita Art Museum, Osaka	Parts of two carts, two people, a cow and a gate.
Fan-paper album of Hokekyō Sutra (紙本著色扇面法華経冊子, shihon chakushoku senmenhokekyōsasshi)	—	—	Heian period, 12th century	Fan paper in folding book form, 98 pages, color on paper, height: 25.6 cm (10.1 cm), width: 49.4 cm (19.4 cm) or 19.0 cm (7.5 cm) (along upper/lower arc)	Shitennō-ji, Osaka	Fan shaped paper with text in Chinese script over a painting of a man, a woman and plants.
New Moon over the brushwood gate (紙本墨画柴門新月図, shihon bokuga saimon shingetsuzu)	—	At the top of the scroll there is a collection of poetry and prose by 18 zen priests.	Muromachi period, 1405	Hanging scroll, ink on paper, 129.2 cm × 31 cm (50.9 in × 12.2 in)	Fujita Art Museum, Osaka	Three people approaching a gate in a landscape with trees and a moon.
Prince Shōtoku with eminent Tendai Priests (絹本著色聖徳太子,天台高僧像, kenpon chakushoku Shotoku Taishi, Tendai Kōsōzō)	—	—	Heian period	Ten hanging scrolls, color on silk	Ichijō-ji, Kasai, Hyōgo	Portrait of a monk in three-quarter view seated cross-legged on a chair. His hands rest, palms up, on his lap in meditating pose.
Snowclad houses in the night (紙本墨画淡彩夜色楼台図, shihonbokuga tansai yashoku rōdaizu)	Yosa Buson	—	Edo period, around 1778	Hanging scroll, ink and light color on paper, 27.9 cm × 130.0 cm (11.0 in × 51.2 in)	private (Mutō Haruta (武藤治太)), Kobe, Hyōgo	Landscape with bright mountains, houses and a dark sky. There is an inscription and red stamp marks on the very right of the scroll.
Amida Triad with a boy attendant (絹本著色阿弥陀三尊及童子像, kenpon chakushoku amida sanson oyobi dōjizō)	—	—	Kamakura period, 12th–13th century	Three hanging scrolls, color on silk, 186.0 cm × 146.3 cm (73.2 in × 57.6 in) (Amida), 182.3 cm × 173.2 cm (71.8 in × 68.2 in) (Kannon and Seishi), 182.5 cm × 55.2 cm (71.9 in × 21.7 in) (boy attendant)	Hokke-ji, Nara, Nara	Two seated deities and a canopy. Petals are raining from the sky. Frontal view of a cross-legged deity. Figure carrying a flag on a pole. Petals are raining from the sky.
Ox and herdboys (絹本著色帰牧図, kenpon chakushoku kibokuzu) or Riding on an ox (騎牛, kigyū)	Li Di	—	Southern Song dynasty, second half of 12th century	Hanging scroll, color on silk, 24.2 cm × 23.8 cm (9.5 in × 9.4 in)	Yamato Bunkakan, Nara, Nara	A boy riding an ox and a tree.
Kusha mandala (絹本著色倶舎曼荼羅図, kenpon chakushoku kusha mandarazu)	—	—	Heian period, 12th century	Hanging scroll, color on silk, 164.5 cm × 177.0 cm (64.8 in × 69.7 in)	Tōdai-ji, Nara, Nara	A deity seated on a pedestal surrounded by five robed standing figures.
Portrait of the priest Jion Daishi (Kuiji) (絹本著色慈恩大師像, kenpon chakushoku jion daishizō)	—	—	Heian period, 11th century	Hanging scroll, color on silk, 161.2 cm × 129.2 cm (63.5 in × 50.9 in)	Yakushi-ji, Nara, Nara	Priest seated cross-legged on a pedestal.
Eleven-faced Goddess of Mercy (絹本著色十一面観音像, kenpon chakushoku jūichimen kannonzō)	—	Handed down in Hokki-ji	Heian period, 12th century	Hanging scroll, color on silk, 168.8 cm × 89.6 cm (66.5 in × 35.3 in)	Nara National Museum, Nara, Nara	Deity embellished with ornaments seated on a pedestal.
Twelve Deities (Devas) (絹本著色十二天像, kenpon chakushoku jūnitenzō)	—	—	Heian period	Twelve hanging scrolls, color on silk, 160.0 cm × 134.5 cm (63.0 in × 53.0 in)	Saidai-ji, Nara, Nara	A deity.
Frescoes in the Kitora Tomb (キトラ古墳壁画, kitora kofun hekiga)	—	Depicted are the Four Symbols on the corresponding walls of the burial chamber, animals of the Chinese zodiac beneath them and an astronomical chart on the ceiling.	Asuka period, 7th or early 8th century	Five fresco paintings, color, 112.1 cm × 203.7 cm (44.1 in × 80.2 in) (Azure Dragon, East), 112.8 cm × 204.2 cm (44.4 in × 80.4 in) (White Tiger, West), 95.7 cm × 72.8 cm (37.7 in × 28.7 in) (Vermilion Bird, South),112.2 cm × 105.7 cm (44.2 in × 41.6 in) (Black Tortoise, North), 105.8 cm × 169.3 cm (41.7 in × 66.7 in) (ceiling)	Kitora Tomb, Asuka, Nara	Red thin circles on wall.
Frescoes in the Takamatsuzuka Tomb (高松塚古墳壁画, takamatsuzuka kofun hekiga)	—	—	Nara period	Four fresco paintings, color	Takamatsuzuka Tomb, Asuka, Nara	Faded figures in a procession.
Mandala of the Two Realms (紺綾地金銀泥絵両界曼荼羅図, konayajikingindeie ryōkaimandarazu) or Kojima mandala (子島曼荼羅, Kojima mandara)	—	Also known as tobi mandara (飛曼荼羅) or hikō mandara (飛行曼荼羅) and originally kept at Kojimadera (子嶋寺), Takatori. According to tradition, Shink (真興), who restored Kojimadera, received the mandalas from Emperor Ichijō during the Chōhō era (999–1004).	Heian period, early 11th century	Two hanging scrolls, gold and silver paint on dark blue silk, 349.1 cm × 307.9 cm (137.4 in × 121.2 in) (Womb Realm mandala) and 351.3 cm × 297.0 cm (138.3 in × 116.9 in) (Diamond Realm mandala)	Nara National Museum, Nara, Nara	A large number of golden deities arranged in regular fashion on a dark-blue background. The deity in the center is surrounded by eight deities arranged like petals. These nine deities in flower-shape are surrounded by a square. 3 times 3 squares decorated with deities in frontal view in various ways. The top center square contains a large deity. The top right square contains a pattern of 3 times 3 deities. The top left square contains a central deity surrounded by a square around which four large and four small deities are arranged in circular fashion. The remaining six squares are virtually identical and contain a large number of deities arranged around a central square with 3 times 3 deities.
shihonkinji chakushoku fūzokuzu (紙本金地著色風俗図) or Matsuura screen (松浦屏風, matsuura byōbu)	—	—	Edo period, c. 1650	Pair of six-section folding screens (byōbu), color on paper with gold leaf background, 155.6 cm × 361.6 cm (61.3 in × 142.4 in)	Yamato Bunkakan, Nara, Nara	Seven women and a girl dressed in kimonos. Two women are playing cards, one is cleaning her teeth while holding a mirror, another is holding a twig, one is writing. Two women are engaged with the girl. Nine women and a girl dressed in kimonos. One woman is reading a sheet of paper, another is playing a shamisen. One woman is doing the hair of another woman.
Illustrated stories about the boy Sudhana's pilgrimage to fifty-four deities and saints (紙本著色華厳五十五所絵巻, shihon chakushoku kegon gojūgosho emaki)	—	—	Heian period, 12th century	Hand scroll (emakimono), color on paper, 29.8 cm × 1,287.0 cm (11.7 in × 506.7 in)	Tōdai-ji, Nara, Nara	People sitting in raised pavilions and other figures.
Legend of Mount Shigi (紙本著色信貴山縁起, shigisan engi)	—	—	Heian period, early 12th century	Three hand scrolls (emakimono), color on paper, 31.5 cm × 827 cm (12.4 in × 325.6 in), 31.25 cm × 1,270.3 cm (12.30 in × 500.12 in) (exorcism of the emperor), 31.5 cm × 1,416 cm (12.4 in × 557.5 in) (story of the Nun)	Chōgosonshi-ji, Heguri, Nara	People running along the coast looking at a golden bowl floating on the water.
Nezame Monogatari Emaki (紙本著色寝覚物語絵巻, shihon chakushoku nezame monogatari emaki)	—	—	Heian period, early 12th century	Hand scroll (emakimono), color on paper, 26 cm × 533 cm (10 in × 210 in)	Yamato Bunkakan, Nara, Nara	A house, trees with white blossoms and people. Part of a house and garden.
Scroll of the Hells (紙本著色地獄草紙, shihon chakushoku jigoku sōshi)	—	—	Kamakura period, 12th century	Hand scroll (emakimono), color on paper, 26.5 cm × 454.7 cm (10.4 in × 179.0 in)	Nara National Museum, Nara, Nara	Three naked persons burning books. A larger yellow monster with a third eye on the forehead is sitting close by.
Extermination of Evil (紙本著色辟邪絵, shihon chakushoku hekijae)	—	—	Heian period, 12th century	Five hanging scrolls, color on paper, 25.8–26.0 cm x 39.2–77.2 cm (10.2 cm x 15.4–30.4 cm)	Nara National Museum, Nara, Nara	A deity embellished with ornaments and four arms grabbing three much smaller persons in three of his hands and the lower body part of another in his fourth hand. To the right of the scene there is Japanese calligraphic text.
Landscape (紙本墨画淡彩山水図, shihon bokuga tansai sansuizu) or Hue of the Water, Light on the Peaks (水色巒光図, suishoku rankōzu)	attributed to Tenshō Shūbun, inscriptions by Kosei Ryuha, Shinchi Mintoku and Shinden Seiha	—	Muromachi period, 1445	Hanging scroll, ink and light color on paper, 108 cm × 32.7 cm (42.5 in × 12.9 in)	Nara National Museum, Nara, Nara	A gate in a landscape with trees and mountains.
Taishakuten mandala (板絵著色伝帝釈天曼荼羅図（金堂来迎壁）, itae chakushoku den Taishaku-ten mandara zu (kondō raikō kabe))	—	Currently located in the middle of three bays on the wall behind the chief object of worship in the kondō (main hall) of the temple, but might not have always been located there. As the temple was previously a Shinto/Buddhist temple associated with the dragon god, there is a possibility this painting was originally intended as a dragon god mandala, or a mandala of praying for rain.	Heian period, 9th century	Wall mural, colors on wood	Murō-ji, Uda, Nara	
Portrait of Kichijōten (麻布著色吉祥天像, asanuno chakushoku kichijōten zō)	—	—	Nara period	Colors on hemp, 53 cm × 31.7 cm (20.9 in × 12.5 in)	Yakushi-ji, Nara, Nara	Portrait of a female deity dressed in a robe.
Amida Trinity (絹本著色阿弥陀三尊像, kenpon chakushoku amida sansonzō)	—	—	Kamakura period	Hanging scroll, colors on silk, 154.0 cm × 135.0 cm (60.6 in × 53.1 in)	Reihōkan, Mt. Kōya, Wakayama	Frontal view of a deity seated on a pedestal framed by two seated attendants.
The Coming of Amida Buddha and Saints of the Pure Land (絹本著色阿弥陀聖衆来迎図, kenpon chakushoku amida shōju raigō zu)	—	Depicts Amida, surrounded by Buddhist saints playing musical instruments, come to greet the spirits of the deceased to escort them to the Pure Land.	Heian-Kamakura period	Three hanging scrolls, colors on silk, triptych	Yūshi Hachimankō Jūhakkain (有志八幡講十八箇院) (in custody at Reihōkan), Mt. Kōya, Wakayama	A deity in frontal view surrounded by attendants floating on clouds.
Portrait of Buddhist monk Gonsō (絹本著色勤操僧正像, kenpon chakushoku gonsō sōshō zō)	—	The inscription on the top tells of a wooden sculpture of Gonsō being created after his death by his pupils praying for happiness in the next world and praising Gonsō's learning and virtue.	Heian period, 12th century	Hanging scroll, colors on silk, 166.4 cm × 136.4 cm (65.5 in × 53.7 in)	Fūmon-in (普門院) (in custody at Reihōkan), Mt. Kōya, Wakayama	
Five great Bodhisattvas of strength (絹本著色五大力菩薩像, kenpon chakushoku godairiki bosatsuzō)	—	Originally five scrolls of which two were destroyed in fire in 1888. Kongōku (金剛吼), Ryūōku (龍王吼) and Muijūrikiku (無畏十力吼) remain.	Heian period	Three hanging scrolls, color on silk, 322.8 cm × 179.5 cm (127.1 in × 70.7 in) (Kongōku), 237.6 cm × 179.5 cm (93.5 in × 70.7 in) (Ryūōku), 179.5 cm × 179.5 cm (70.7 in × 70.7 in) (Muijūrikiku)	有志八幡講十八箇院 (Yūshi Hachimankō Jūhakkain) (in custody at Reihōkan), Mt. Kōya, Wakayama	Frontal view of a fierce looking black deity surrounded by flames.
Dragon King Zennyo (絹本著色善女竜王像, kenpon chakushoku zennyo ryūōzō)	Jōchi (定智)	—	Heian period, 1145	Hanging scroll, color on silk, 163.6 cm × 111.2 cm (64.4 in × 43.8 in)	Reihōkan, (owned by Kongōbu-ji,) Mt. Kōya, Wakayama	A deity in three-quarter view dressed in a robe.
Senchū Yūgen Kannon (絹本著色伝船中湧現観音像, kenpon chakushoku den senchū yūgen kannonzō)	—	—	Heian period, 12th century	Hanging scroll, color on silk, 79.4 cm × 41.8 cm (31.3 in × 16.5 in)	Ryūkōin (龍光院) (in custody at Reihōkan), Mt. Kōya, Wakayama	A deity in three-quarter view dressed in a robe.
Buddha's Nirvana (絹本著色仏涅槃図, kenpon chakushoku butsunehanzu)	—	—	Heian period, 1086	Hanging scroll, color on silk, 267.6 cm × 271.2 cm (105.4 in × 106.8 in)	Reihōkan, Kongōbu-ji, Mt. Kōya, Wakayama	Buddha lying on a platform surrounded by mourners.
Landscape and figures on sliding partitions (紙本著色山水人物図, shihon chakushoku sansui jinbutsuzu)	Ike no Taiga	—	Edo period, 18th century	Ten paintings on fusuma, color on paper	Reihōkan, (owned by Kongōbu-ji), Mt. Kōya, Wakayama	A pavilion with two people in a landscape
The Legendary Origins of Kokawadera (紙本著色粉河寺縁起, shihon chakushoku Kokawadera engi)	—	—	early Kamakura period, 12th century	Hand scroll (emakimono), color on paper, 30.8 cm × 1,984.2 cm (12.1 in × 781.2 in)	Kokawa-dera, Kinokawa, Wakayama	A horse and a man sitting under a tree with people carrying items over a bridge towards a gate at which more people are seated. House with people and two horses
Fugen Bosatsu (Samantabhadra) (絹本著色普賢菩薩像, kenpon chakushoku fugen bosatsuzō)	—	—	Heian period, 12th century	Hanging scroll, color on silk, 102.4 cm × 52.1 cm (40.3 in × 20.5 in)	Bujō-ji (豊乗寺), Chizu, Tottori	Side view of a deity seated on a pedestal on top of a white elephant.
Kenpon chakushoku kyūjozu (絹本著色宮女図) or denkanyaōzu (伝桓野王図)	—	—	Yuan dynasty, 14th century	Hanging scroll, color on silk, 86.1 cm × 29.9 cm (33.9 in × 11.8 in)	private (Ōhara Ken'ichirō (大原謙一郎)), Kurashiki, Okayama	Portrait of a woman in disguise of a man wearing a red round-necked robe of the nobility and a cap of black gauze. A yokobue transverse flute is tucked in her obi and she is watching the fingers of both of her hands.
Landscape (紙本墨画淡彩山水図, shihon bokuga tansai sansuizu)	Sesshū Tōyō	—	Muromachi period	Hanging scroll, ink and light color on paper	private (Ōhara Ken'ichirō (大原謙一郎)), Kurashiki, Okayama	
Fugen Enmei (Samantabhadra) (絹本著色普賢延命像, kenpon chakushoku fugen enmeizō)	—	—	Heian period, 1153	Hanging scroll, color on silk, 149.3 cm × 86.6 cm (58.8 in × 34.1 in)	Jikō-ji, Onomichi, Hiroshima	Deity with many arms seated on a pedestal on top of four white elephants.
Heike nōkyō (平家納経)	Taira no Kiyomori and 32 members of the Taira clan	30 scrolls of the Lotus Sutra, one Amitabha Sutra scroll, one Heart Sutra scroll and one prayer scroll in the handwriting of Taira no Kiyomori dedicated to the Itsukushima Shrine.	Heian period, 1164	33 sūtra hand scrolls with illustrations, ink on decorated paper, 25.4 cm × 537.9 cm (10.0 in × 211.8 in) (Hōben-bon), 27.2 cm × 767.4 cm (10.7 in × 302.1 in) (Hiyu-bon), 24.9 cm × 270.7 cm (9.8 in × 106.6 in) (Hōshi-bon), 26.5 cm × 266.8 cm (10.4 in × 105.0 in) (Juryō-bon)	Itsukushima Shrine, Hatsukaichi, Hiroshima	Priest praying in front of a woman and another priest praying facing the window. All three are in a house. A fourth person praying is under a pergola in the landscape or garden outside of the house.
Landscapes of the Four Seasons (紙本墨画淡彩四季山水図, shihon bokuga tansai)	Sesshū Tōyō	—	Muromachi period, 1486	Hand scroll, ink and light color on paper, 37.0 cm × 159 cm (14.6 in × 62.6 in)	Mōri Museum, Hōfu, Yamaguchi	Two houses in a landscape with trees and high mountains. A large number of people is on the path leading from one house to the other.

== See also ==
- Independent Administrative Institution National Museum
- Japanese painting
- Nara Research Institute for Cultural Properties
- Tokyo Research Institute for Cultural Properties
