= Kaō (painter) =

Japanese painter

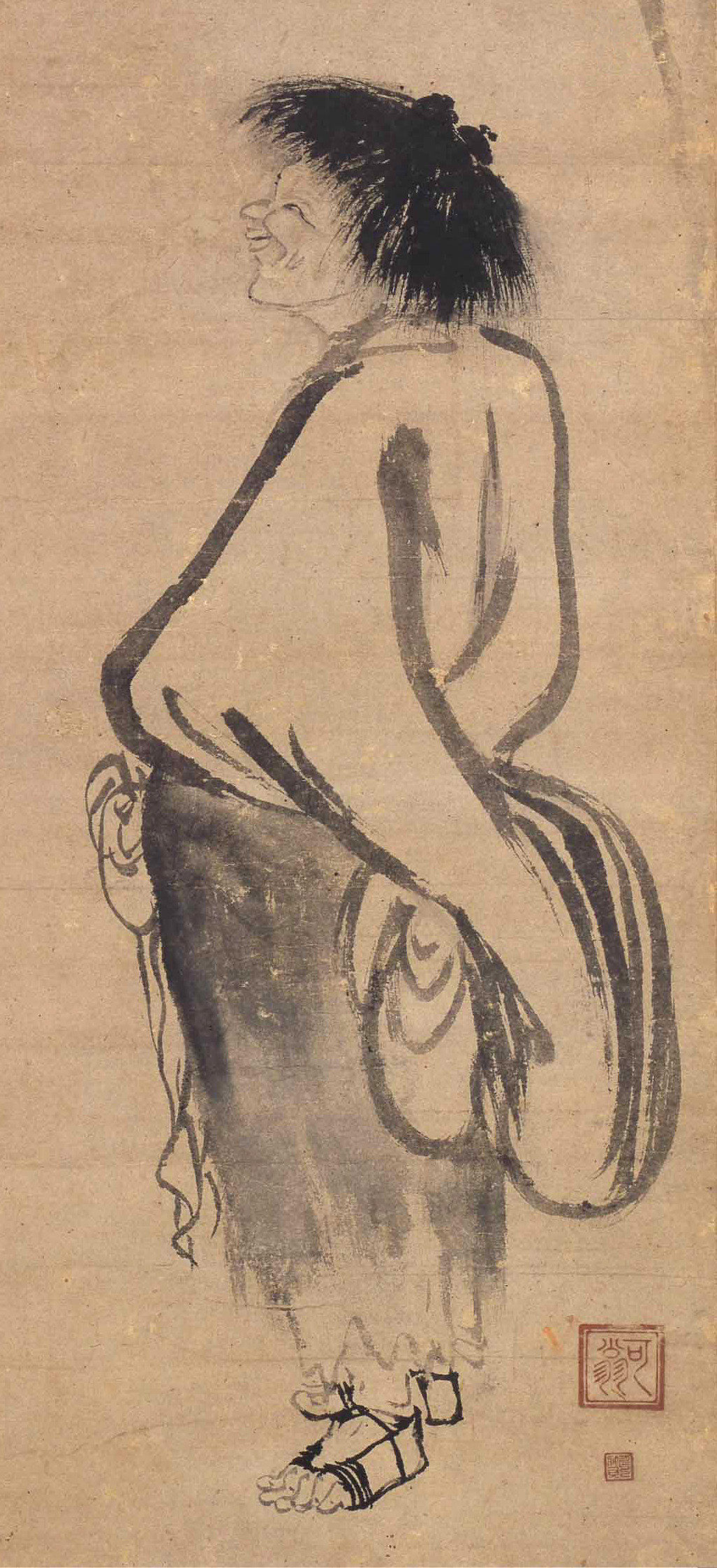
Portrait of Kanzan

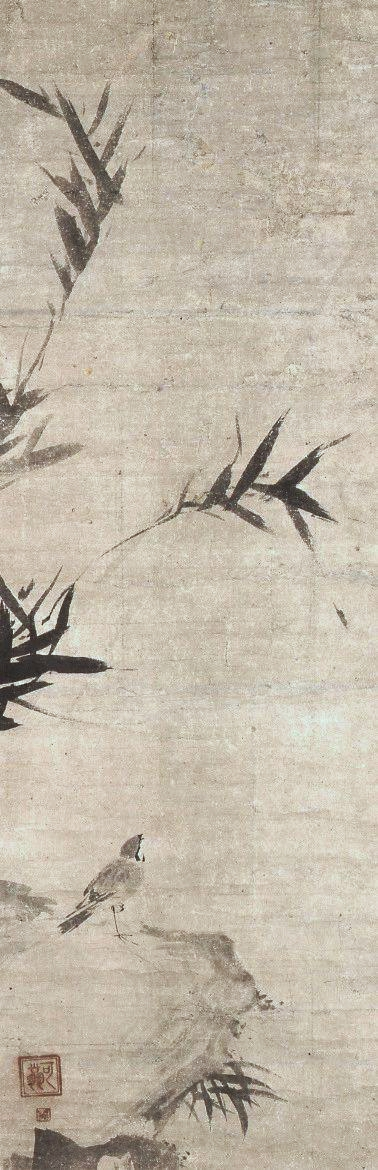
Bamboo and a Sparrow

Kaō Ninga (可翁; fl. early 14th century) was a Japanese priest-painter whose work is considered typical of early Muromachi painting. Some of the earliest suiboku works can be attributed to him. He is especially known for his depiction of the legendary monk Kensu (Hsien-tzu in Chinese) at the moment he achieved enlightenment. This type of painting was executed with quick brushstrokes and a minimum of detail.

The biography of Kaō remains largely unknown. It is commonly believed that he was a Japanese Zen monk who lived in China for over a decade. He entered monastic life at a young age and traveled during the late Kamakura period. Upon his return, he is believed to have become the abbot of a Zen temple.

== See also ==
- List of National Treasures of Japan (paintings)
