= Shaka rising from the Gold Coffin =

11th-century hanging scroll

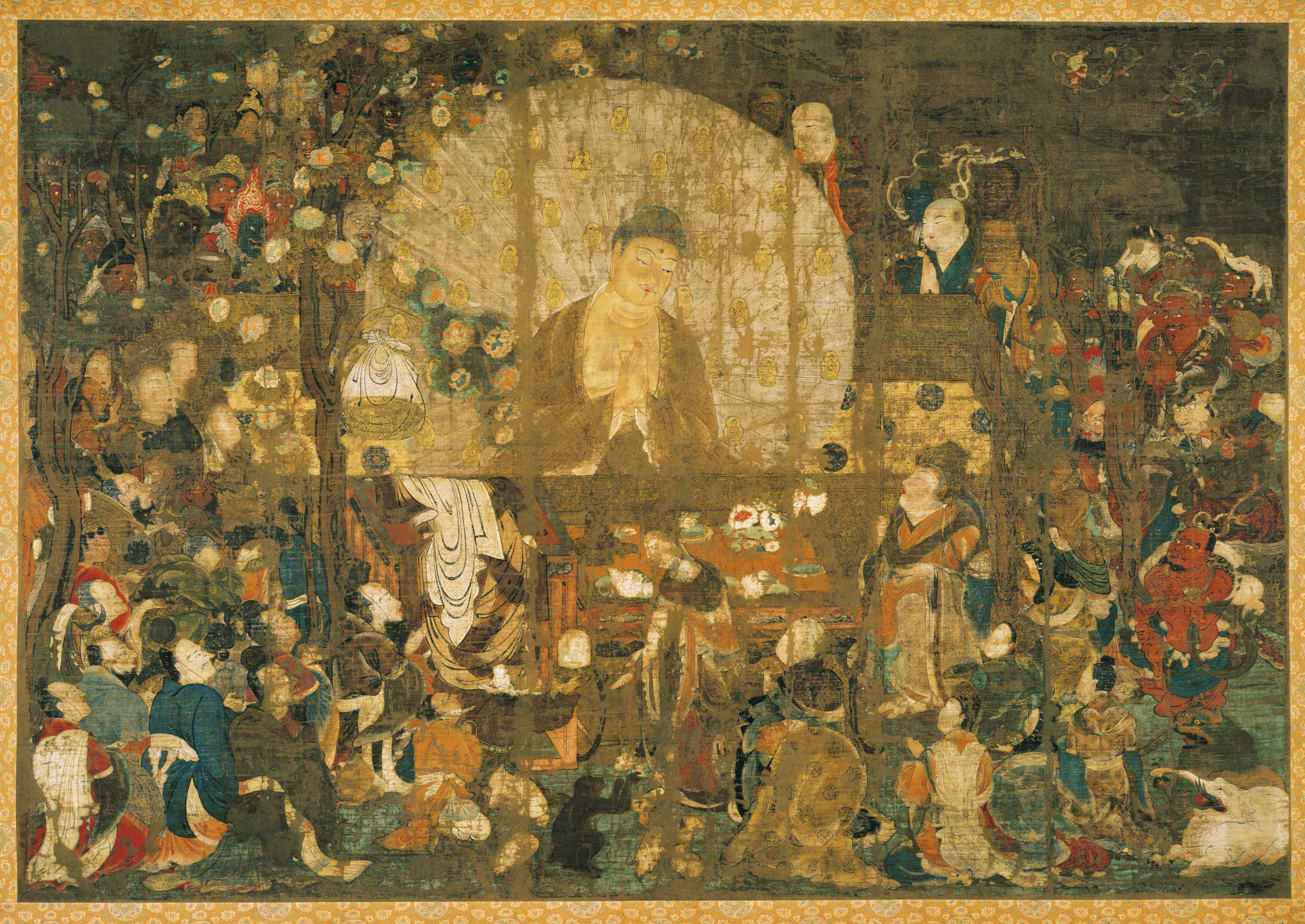
- Artist: Unknown
- Year: 11th century
- Type: Hanging scroll, color on silk
- Dimensions: 160.0 cm × 229.5 cm (63.0 in × 90.4 in)
- Location: Kyoto National Museum; Kyoto, Japan

Shaka rising from the Gold Coffin (絹本著色釈迦金棺出現図) is an anonymous hanging scroll from the 11th century depicting the resurrection of Shakyamuni Buddha as described in the Mahamaya Sutra.

A masterpiece of Buddhist painting in the late Heian period (794–1185), it has been praised for its "lively" and "extremely delicate and sensitive" ink brushwork, "used skillfully to create a dramatic scene". The decoration of the dresses is seen as characteristic of the Fujiwara period, with "elaborate cut-gold design" and "gold and rich colors applied to the main figure wonderfully". It has been designated a National Treasure of Japan.

The scroll depicts a dramatic scene following the death of Gautama Buddha (Shaka or Sakyamuni). When his mother Maya heard that Buddha had died and attained Enlightenment and entered Nirvana, she rushed to see him from Trāyastriṃśa. When she arrived, Buddha opened his golden coffin and rose up, with one thousand rays gleaming from his head. According to the Mahamaya Sutra, he then "calmly informed his mother that all laws are imperishable, and that he had left behind him all the law necessary for posterity". This sutra was the first reference to the episode of the resurrection of Buddha. It was translated into chinese in the 6th century, and has been seen as a main influence for this painting. Many saintly figures, demons and animals surround the coffin and contemplate the scene, as Buddha and Maya look at each other. After speaking with his mother, Buddha laid down and closed himself the coffin.

The painting used to belong to the Chōhō-ji temple, but it was donated by Matsunaga Kinenkan to the Kyoto National Museum in Kyoto, where it is now kept and exhibited occasionally. During January 2018, it was lent to the Tokyo National Museum, and exhibited in the Honkan Room 2 (National Treasure Gallery).
