= Hell Scroll (Nara National Museum) =

12th century painted scroll

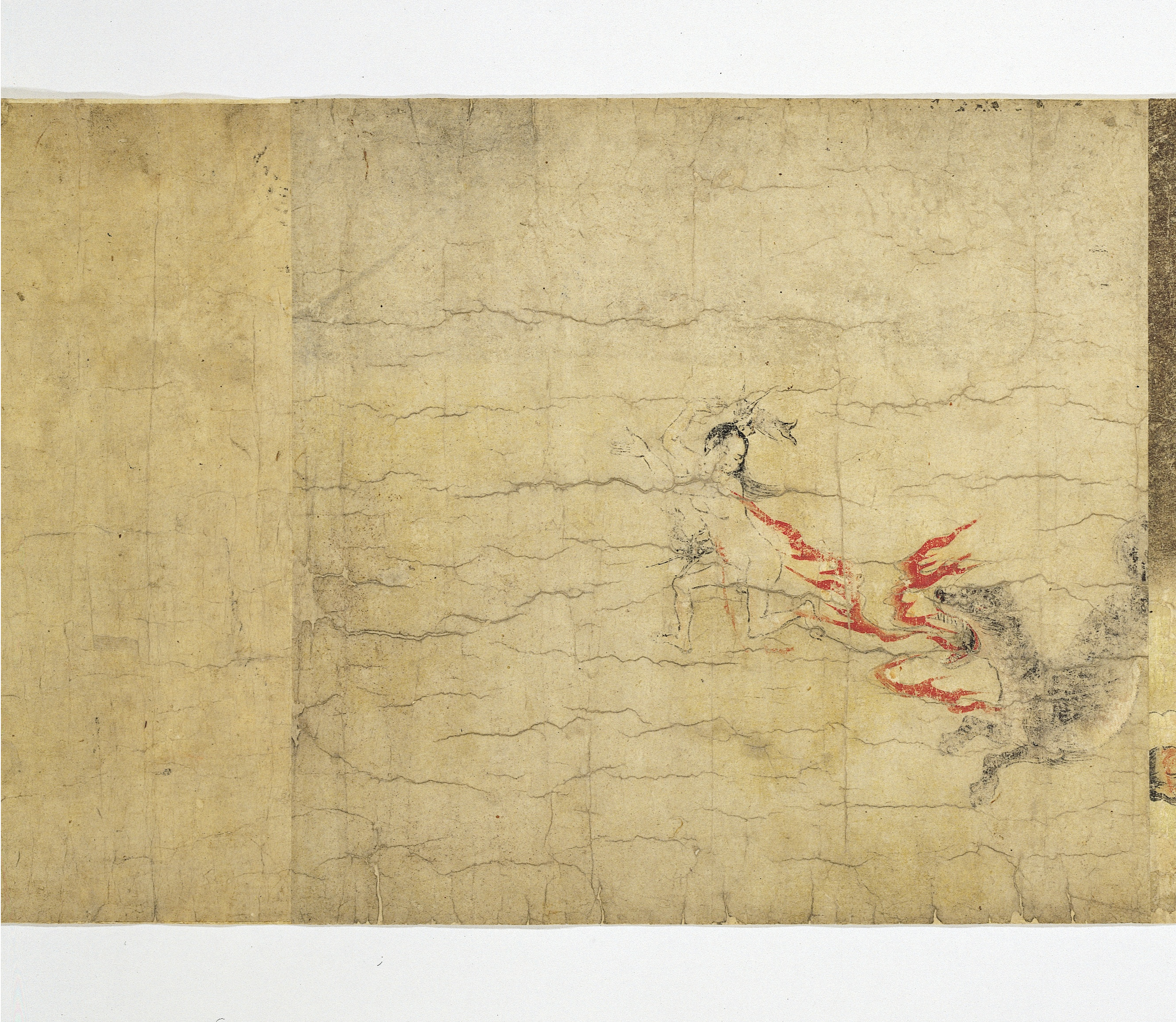
- Artist: Unknown
- Year: 12th century
- Type: Color on paper
- Dimensions: 26.5 cm × 453.9 cm (10.4 in × 178.7 in)
- Location: Nara National Museum; Nara, Nara Prefecture, Japan

Hell Scroll (地獄草紙, jigokuzōji) is a scroll depicting seven out of the sixteen lesser hells presented in Kisekyō ("Sutra of the World Arising"). Six of the paintings are accompanied by text, which all begin with the phrase "There is yet another hell", following a description of what the sinners depicted did to end up in this particular hell.

The seven hells depicted are:

1. the Hell of Excrement (ja: 屎糞所, しふんしょ)
2. the Hell of Measures (函量所, かんりょうしょ)
3. the Hell of the Iron Mortar (鉄磑所, てつがいしょ)
4. the Hell of the Flaming Rooster (鶏地獄, とりじごく)
5. the Hell of the Black Sand Cloud (黒雲沙, こくうんしゃ)
6. the Hell of Pus and Blood (膿血所, のうけつしょ)
7. the Hell of Foxes and Wolves (狐狼地獄 狼野干泥梨, ころうじごく ろうやかんないり)

It is considered likely that the scroll corresponds to the Paintings of the Six Paths, commissioned by Emperor Goshirakawa in the 12th century. This handscroll was preserved in Daishō-in in Higashiokubo, Tokyo until the Meiji period, when it came into the hands of the Hara family of Kanagawa, later ending up in the possession of the Japanese government.

== The whole scroll ==
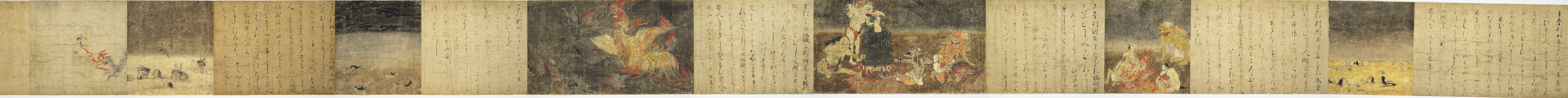
The whole scroll. Except for the last section all paintings are accompanied by a text starting with the phrase: "There is yet another hell,..." followed by a description of the cause of the sinner's fall into this particular hell.

== See also ==
- Naraka (Buddhism)
- List of National Treasures of Japan (paintings)
