= Nara National Museum =

Coordinates: 34.68370°N 135.83640°E

- 奈良国立博物館
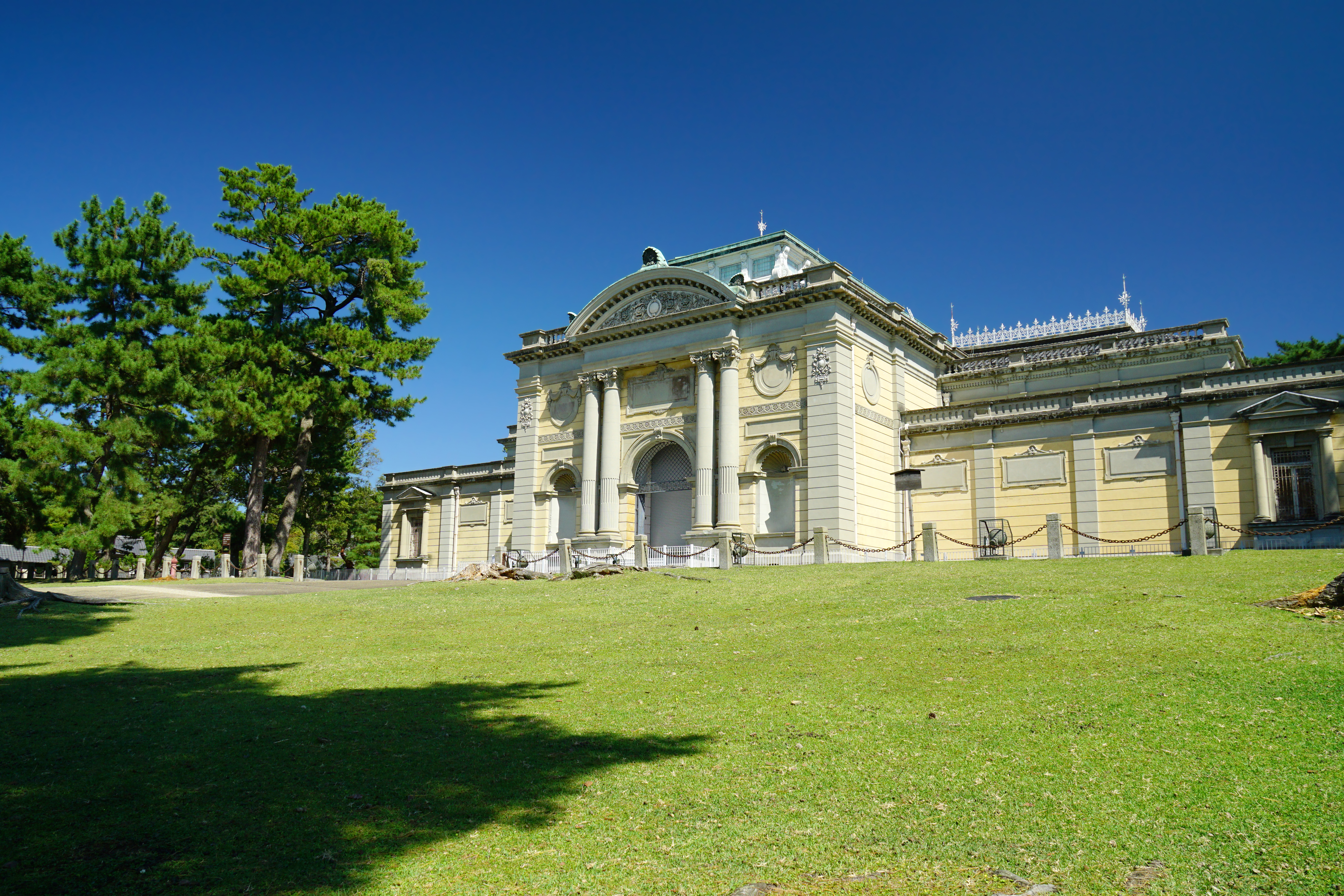
- Original Museum Building
- Established: 1889
- Location: Nara, Japan
- Type: Art museum
- Website: http://www.narahaku.go.jp/

The Nara National Museum (奈良国立博物館, Nara Kokuritsu Hakubutsukan) is one of the pre-eminent national art museums in Japan.

== Introduction ==
The Nara National Museum is located in Nara, which was the capital of Japan from 710 to 784. Katayama Tōkuma (1854–1917) designed the original building, which is a representative Western-style building of the Meiji period and has been designated an Important Cultural Property in Japan. Junzō Yoshimura (1908–1997) designed a supplemental building in 1973.

== Collections ==
The museum is noted for its collection of Buddhist art, including images, sculpture, and altar articles. The museum houses and displays works of art belonging to temples and shrines in the Nara area. Properties kept in the Shōsōin repository are exhibited each year in the autumn.

In the museum's collection is the 12th-century Hell Scroll (Nara National Museum) (地獄草紙), 11th or 12th-century mandala Jōdo mandara-zu, and the 9th-century sculpture of the seated Buddha Yakushi.

== History ==
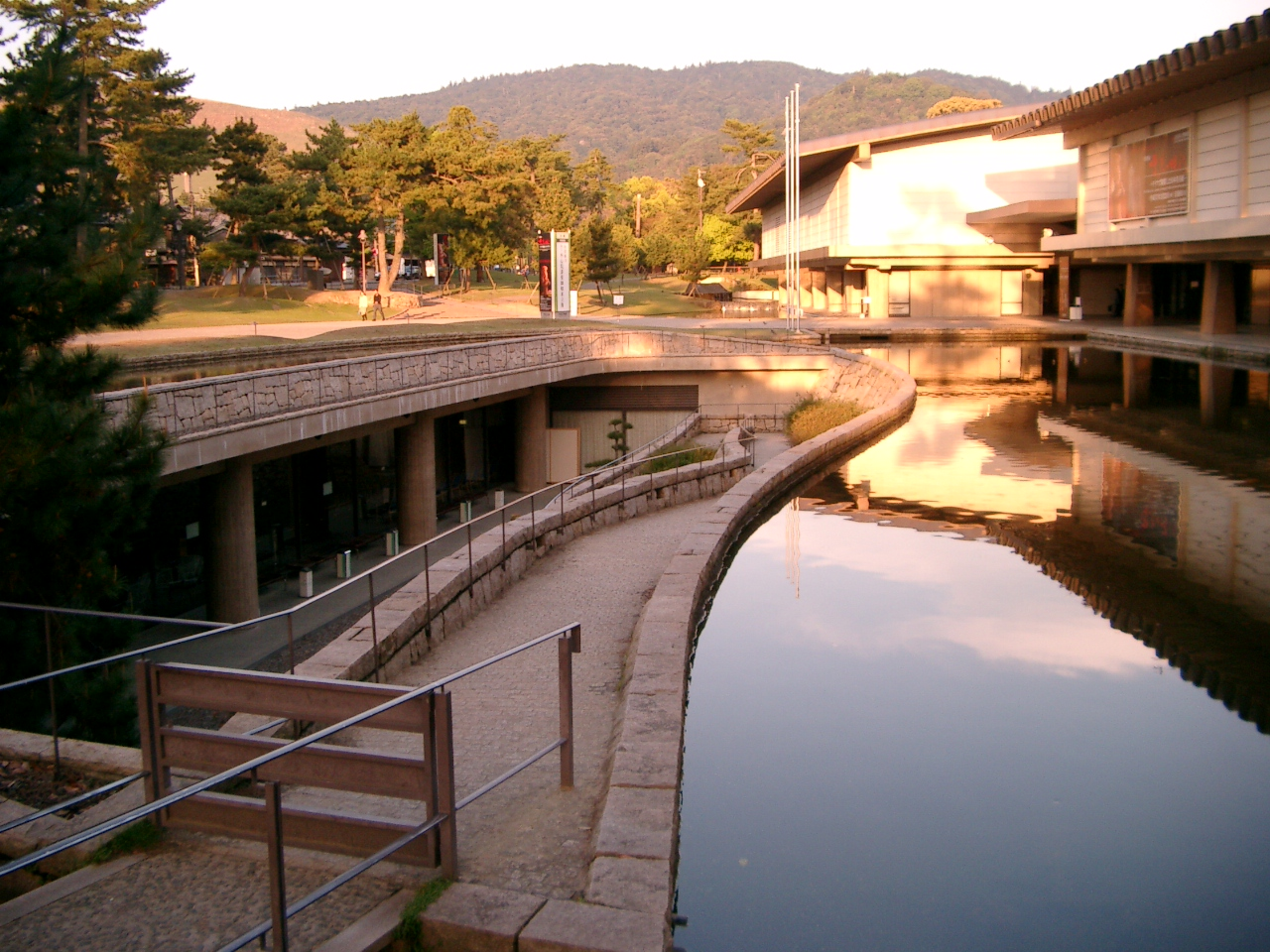
New museum building

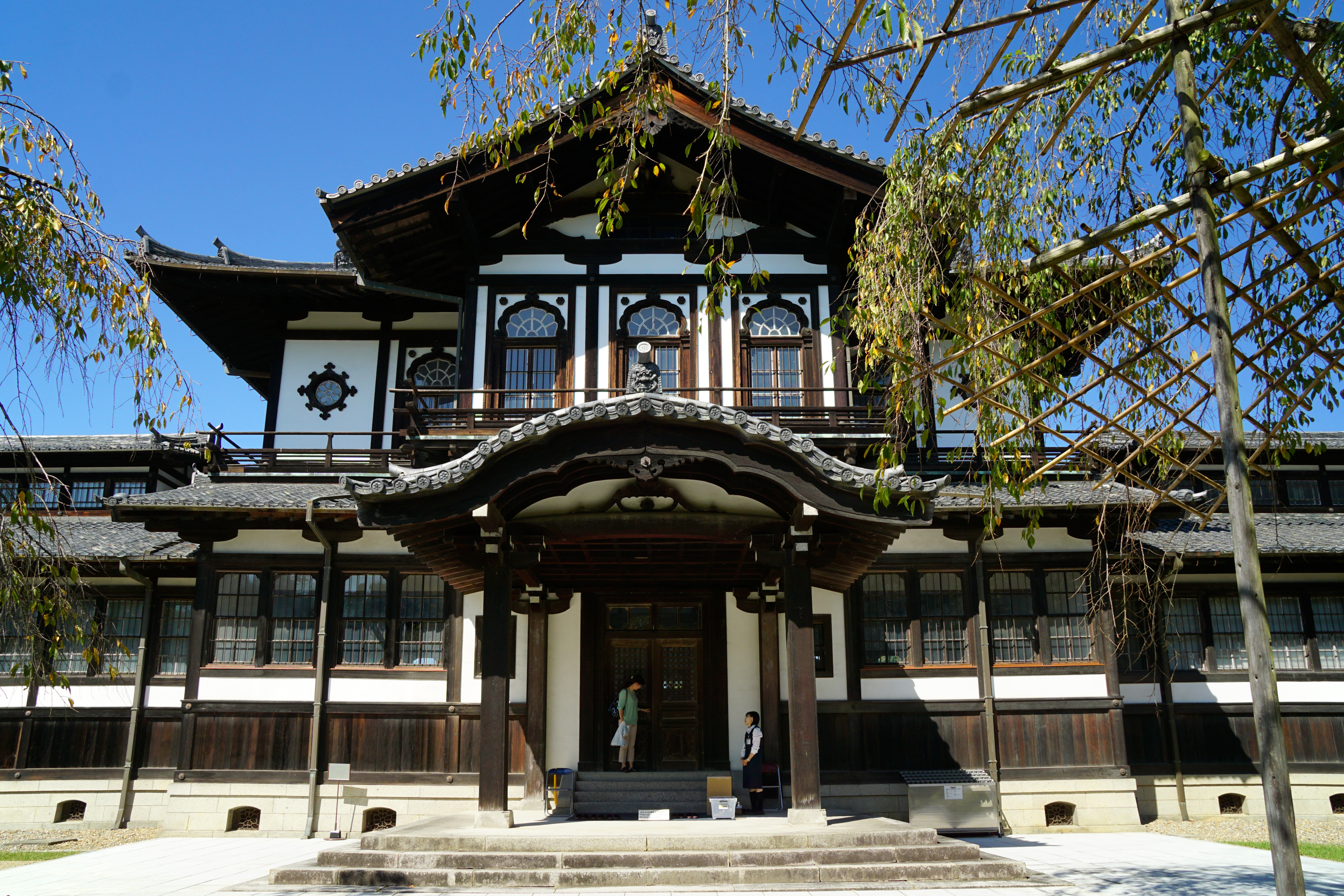
Buddhist Art Library

The Nara National Museum was established in 1889 as the Imperial Nara Museum (帝国奈良博物館). The Nara National Museum held its first exhibition in 1895. As prehistory to the opening, there was a Nara exhibition. In 1874, Nara exhibition company of semi-governmental management was established by the then Nara governor Fujii Chihiro. The museum was renamed the Imperial Household Museum of Nara. It has been known by its present name since 1952.

=== Timeline ===
- 1889—Museum is established as the "Imperial Museum of Nara."
- 1895—First exhibition is opened.
- 1900—Museum is renamed the "Imperial Household Museum of Nara."
- 1914—Shōsōin department is established.
- 1947—Imperial Household Ministry's responsibility for Museum's collections is transferred to the Ministry of Education.
- 1950—Museum is associated with the Committee for the Preservation of Cultural Properties.
- 1952—Museum is renamed the "Nara National Museum".
- 1968—Museum is affiliated with the Agency for Cultural Affairs.
- 1969—Original Museum Building is designated an "Important Cultural Property".
- 1972—A new exhibition building (the West Wing) is completed.
- 1980—Buddhist Art Library is opened.
- 1995—100th anniversary of the museum's opening is held.
- 1997—East Wing and the underground corridor are completed.
- 2000—Conservation Center for preserving cultural properties is completed.
- 2001—Museum is renamed "Nara National Museum" of the "Independent Administrative Institution National Museum" (IAI National Museum).
- 2005—IAI National Museum is expanded with addition of Kyushu National Museum.
- 2007—IAI National Museum is merged into Independent Administrative Institution National Institutes for Cultural Heritage (NICH), combining the four national museums with the former National Institutes for Cultural Preservation at Tokyo and Nara

== Facilities ==
=== Original Museum Building ===
The Original Museum Building was designed by Katayama Tōkuma who was architect for the Imperial Household Agency. This building was completed in 1894, and is built in the French Renaissance style. Noted especially for the decorative ornamentation around its West Entrance, it is an example of middle Meiji-period European architecture. This exhibition hall was designated an Important Cultural Property by the national government in 1969.

=== East and West Wings ===
Designed by Junzō Yoshimura. Construction of the West wing began on the hall on 18 December 1970 and was completed on 31 March 1972. The East Wing was inaugurated in October 1997 and opened in April 1998. An architectural style of the East Wing is congruent to the West Wing.

=== Lower Level Passageway ===
The Lower-Level Passageway joins the East and West Wings with the Original Museum Building and houses the Museum Shop and a Lounge & Restaurant. The exhibit cases on both sides the passageway contain models and illustrations explaining the construction of Buddhist sculpture. Visitors do not need museum admission tickets to enter this 150 meter-long corridor. The area serves as a rest and relaxation place for museum visitors and the general public.

=== Buddhist Art Library ===
The Research Center for Buddhist Art was established in April 1980 for the collection, organization, and storage of books, replicas, rubbings, photographs, and other archival and research materials related to Buddhist art. The center's library and photographic archives have been open to the public since May 1989, primarily as a resource for researchers.

=== Hassoan ===
The Japanese tea ceremony house " Hassoan (八窓庵) " in the inner garden of the Nara National Museum was originally built on the grounds of Daijo-in, a sub-temple of Kōfuku-ji Temple. Also known as Gansuitei, the tea house was built in the middle Edo period. It is well known for its many windows, a favorite style of the tea connoisseur Furuta Oribe (1544–1615). Together with the tea houses Rokusoan (六窓庵) in the Kōfuku-ji, and Okiroku (隠岐録) in the Tōdai-ji, Hassoan is considered one of the Three Great Tea Houses of Nara.

Hassoan contains a tea room of four tatami mats with a tokonoma. It is built in the rustic style, including a hipped and gabled, thatched roof. Inside, the ceiling is partially covered with rush, while other areas reveal the finished underside of the roof.

In order to preserve the tea house in Nara for future generations, Nara residents successfully petitioned for Hassoan to be given to the Imperial Nara Museum in 1890. Hassoan was moved onto the museum grounds in 1892.

=== Conservation Center ===
The Conservation Center, opened in 2002, was established to rescue, examine, document, conserve, and restore National Treasures and other key cultural properties. Restorers specializing in the conservation of sculptures, paintings, and ancient texts work out of the institution. Specialists also advise the owners and custodians of cultural assets.

== See also ==
- List of National Treasures of Japan (ancient documents)
- List of National Treasures of Japan (archaeological materials)
- List of National Treasures of Japan (crafts-others)
- List of National Treasures of Japan (paintings)
- List of National Treasures of Japan (sculptures)
- List of National Treasures of Japan (writings)
- Agency for Cultural Affairs
  - National Institutes for Cultural Heritage
    - Tokyo National Museum, Tokyo
    - Kyoto National Museum, Kyoto
    - Kyushu National Museum, Dazaifu
