= Hell Scroll (Tokyo National Museum) =

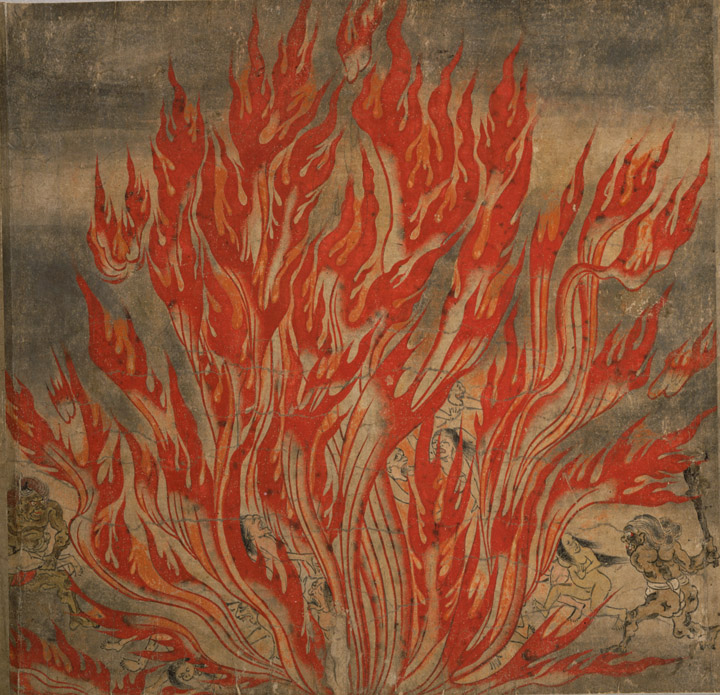
Jigoku-Zoshi (Tokyo National Museum)

The Jigoku-zoshi ("Handscrolls of Buddhist Hell") is a late 12th-century Japanese scroll (emakimono, 絵巻物), depicting the 8 great hells and the 16 lesser hells in text and painting.

== See also ==
- List of National Treasures of Japan (paintings)
