= Catching a catfish with a gourd =

Ink wash painting by Josetsu, c. 1415

Catching a catfish with a gourd (Hyōnen-zu) by Josetsu

Catching a catfish with a gourd (瓢鮎図, Hyō-nen-zu) is a hanging scroll painting by the 15th-century artist Josetsu (如拙). The painting was executed in c. 1415 and is held by Taizō-in, a sub-temple of the Myōshin-ji complex of Zen Buddhist temples in Kyoto. It is one of the earliest suiboku (ink wash) paintings in Japan and was designated as a National Treasure of Japan in 1951. The painting is accompanied by many inscriptions, and may be considered an example of shigajiku (a "poem-and-painting scroll").

Josetsu was born and trained as an artist in China but settled in Japan. He was one of the first suiboku painters working in Japan in the Muromachi period.

== Description ==
This painting in ink on paper depicts an old man in ragged clothes holding out a bottle gourd (hyōtan) beside a narrow winding stream, with a stand of bamboo in the foreground to the left and mountains rising through mist in the background to the right. The man is apparently attempting to catch a catfish (namazu) that is swimming past.

The work was inspired by a riddle set by Ashikaga Yoshimochi, the fourth shōgun of the Ashikaga shogunate: "How do you catch a catfish with a gourd?" The full scroll measures 111.5 cm × 75.8 cm (43.9 in × 29.8 in), with long inscription above the painting recording the shōgun's rhetorical question and also that Josetsu drew an answer, and naming 31 leading Zen monks who each provide a written response to the shōgun's question. The work may have been commissioned for the tangen, the shōgun's private Zen chapel at his new Sanjo-bomon Palace.

Catching a slippery catfish fish with an unsuitable utensil such as a smooth and rounded gourd would be so difficult as to be almost impossible, but illustrates the impossibility of using logical rationalisation to understand Zen. It can be viewed as Zen humour, or as a kōan in an unusual visual form designed to provoke the viewer into new ways of thinking or seeing. It may allude to a Chinese saying, "a catfish climbing a bamboo pole" (meaning, "doing the impossible", drawn from a comment attributed to the wife of the Song dynasty poet Mei Yaochen), or a similar Japanese phrase hyōtan de namazu wo osaeru ("to pin down a catfish with a gourd", similar to the English expression "as slippery as an eel", often shortened to hyōtan namazu, meaning "catfish gourd"). It may also recall traditional Japanese beliefs that both the gourd and the catfish have magic powers, according to which the gourd is said to be able to control snakes, and the catfish to predict earthquakes.

== Legacy ==
The work inspired popular otsu-e imitations in following centuries, often showing a monkey attempting to catch a catfish with a gourd. Catfish paintings or namazu-e became popular after the 1855 Edo earthquake, with an example made by Kunisada in 1857 showing a monkey catching a giant catfish with a gourd.

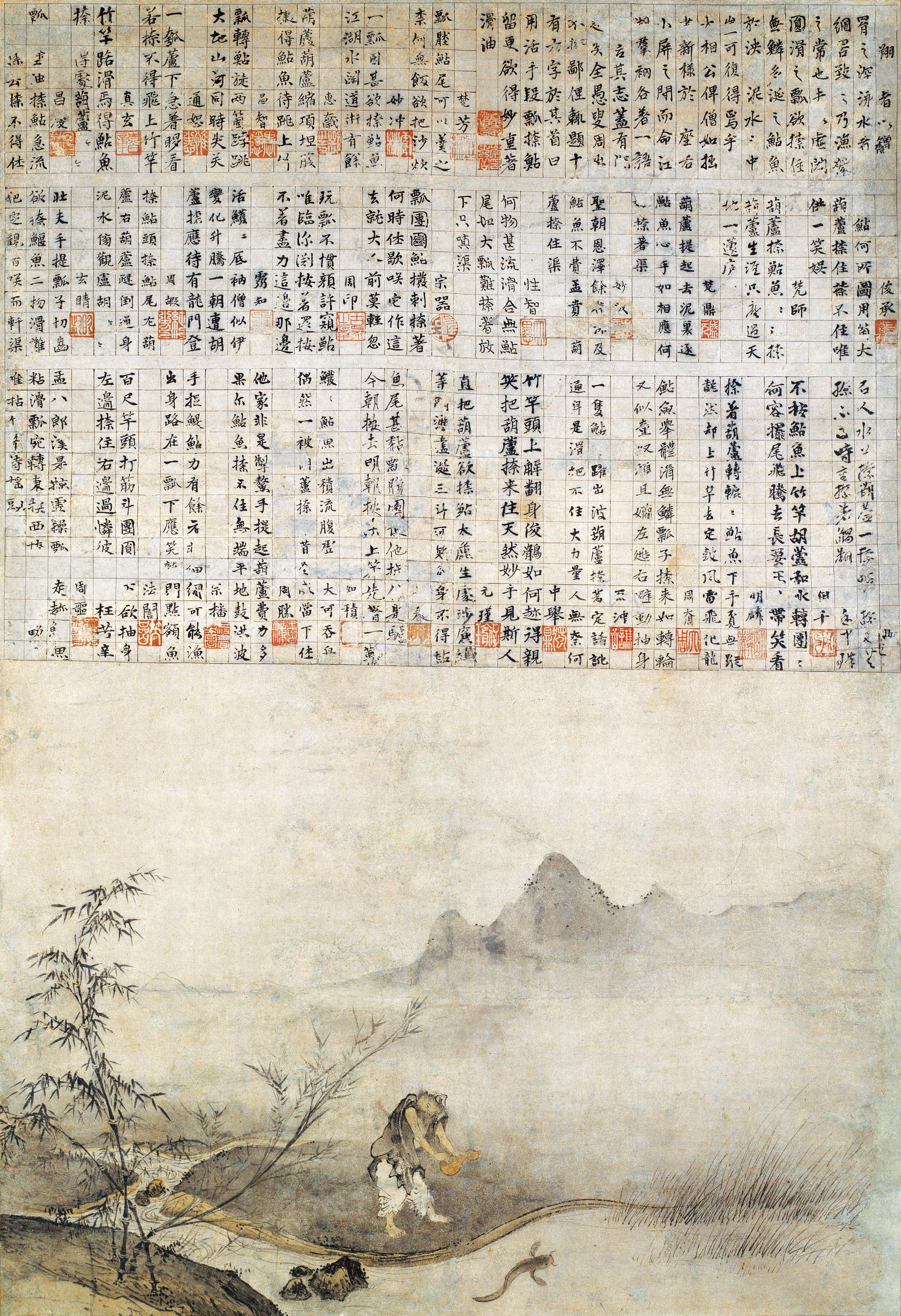
Full scroll with inscriptions, 111.5cm high, 75.8cm wide

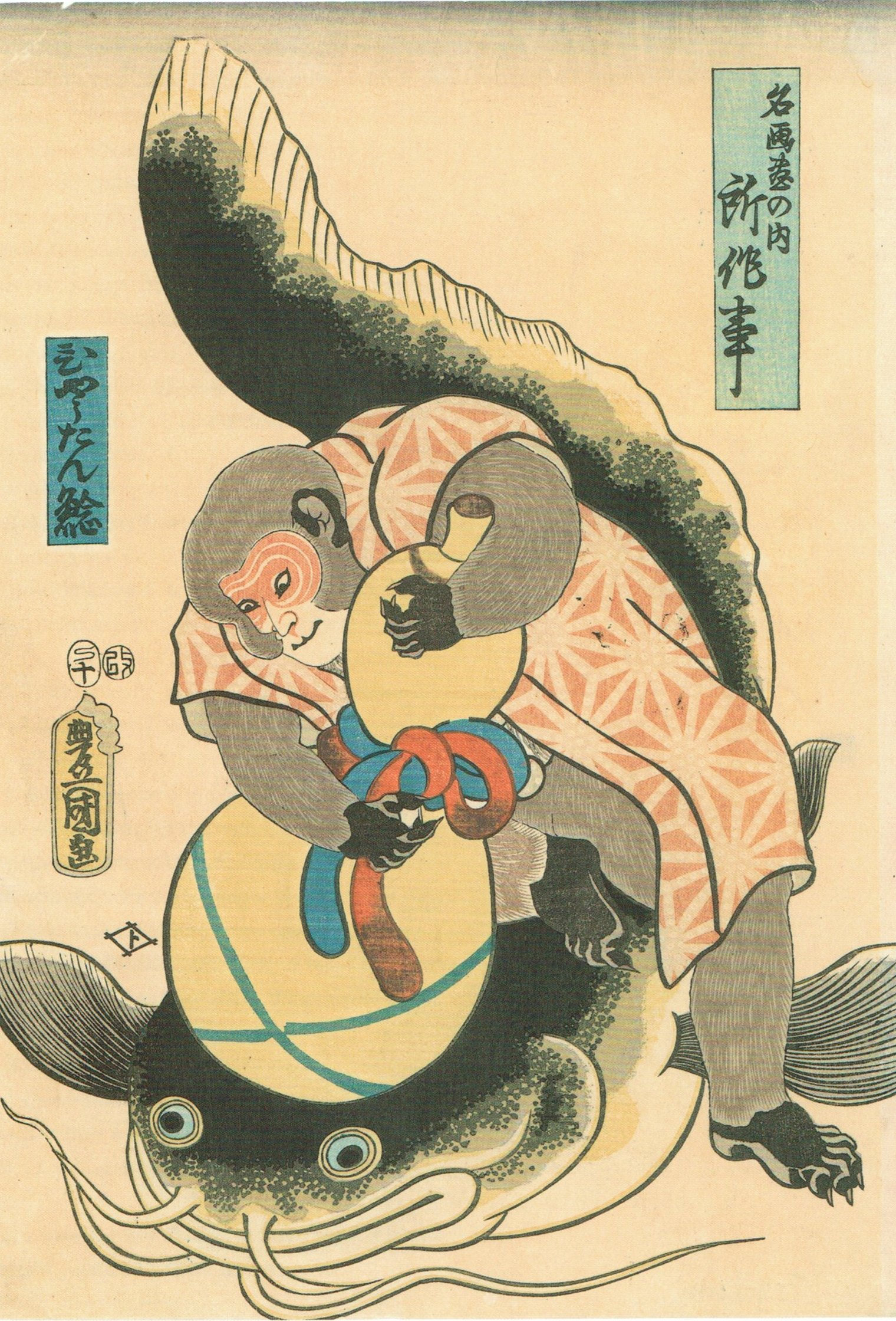
Kunisada's print of a monkey, Catching a Catfish with a Gourd (Hyotan namazu), 1857
