= Shigajiku =

Form of Japanese ink wash painting

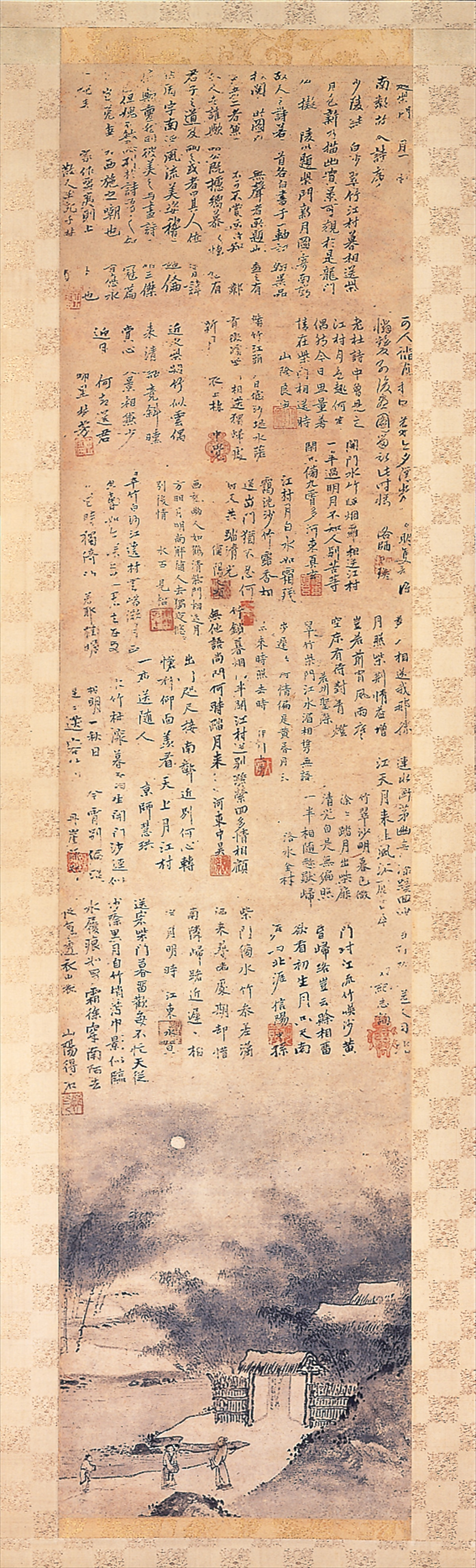
Newly Risen Moon over a Brushwood Gate. Fujita Museum of Art, Osak.

Shigajiku (Japanese: 詩画軸, "poem-and-painting scrolls"), are a form of Japanese ink wash painting. These hanging scrolls depict poetic inscriptions at the top of the scroll and a painted image, usually a landscape scene, below. Buddhist monks of the gozan 五山 or Five Mountain monasteries of the early Muromachi Period (1336-1573) first introduced the poem-and-painting scrolls.

Shigajiku is a modern category given to the visual and literary culture of the Muromachi Period rooted in the Zen tradition. The most common visual aesthetic for shigajiku is a monochrome water and ink style of painting, suibokuga 水墨画, with only occasional traces of color throughout the scroll.

== History ==
The first poem-and-painting scrolls came to Japan with the return of the first Zen monks who had been studying in China. The most important cultural precedent to shigajiku was the Chinese version of the poem/scroll, the shijiku 詩軸. This continental version served as a model for the future poem-and-painting scrolls produced by the Japanese Five Mountains monks. Yet, shigajiku are distinct from their Chinese predecessors because of the distinctive hanging scroll format and the number of inscriptions on the scrolls themselves.

The creation of shigajiku is closely tied to the secular and religious lives of the Five Mountains monks. The formation of tatuchū, or sub-temples, provides the basis for the social relationships through which the shigajiku would be created and circulated. The tatuchū created a new social unit among Japanese Zen monks and gave rise to the shikai or poetry meetings. These communities and meetings provide an important social base for the monks of the Five Mountain monasteries. Clerics intermingled with each other and exchanged scrolls with other monks during such gatherings. These monks would then compose and write poems on each other's scrolls, thus accounting for some scrolls having between four and thirty inscriptions.

The first surviving shigajiku, Newly Risen Moon over a Brushwood Gate, was produced in the Five Mountains Zen monasteries during 1400. Of the eighteen inscriptions, six are connected to Nanzen-ji, the temple and literary epicenter for Zen monks during the early 15th century. This connection highlights the importance of the social relationships of the clerics and the spiritual value of the painting.

== Genre Categories of Shigajiku ==
The subjects of poem-and-painting scrolls vary to include subjects such as: portrait scrolls, chinsō; scrolls on Daoist and Buddhist subjects, dōshaku senki; and landscape scrolls, sansui. Most shigajiku are the last category landscape of which there are many different representations. The different themes of the landscape genre will be focused on here as they appear most frequently in shigajiku.

=== Themes within the landscape genre ===
- Zen kōan – riddles posed by a Zen master designed to teach/enlighten pupils
- Sōbetsuzu – farewell pictures
- Kaiyūzu – commemorative paintings
- Shiizu – painting themes taken from poetry (usually Chinese poetry)
- Shosaizu – a scholar's study in mountain setting

The most common theme of landscape is the image of a secluded scholar's study in a mountain setting or shosaizu. Monks of the tatuchū communities popularized the idea of creating idealizing, memorializing, and pining images of the scholar's study to escape the confines of a private subtemple. These poem-and painting scrolls depict idealized retreats into nature with open skies, vast waters, and hazy mountain views – a perfect setting for the intellectual pleasures of retired monks living out their secluded lives. These scholar's studies were seen as blissful escapes from busy city life where peace was difficult to find. Key features include rocks, cliffs, flowing water, a bridge, a mountain path, an elderly scholar climbing, vast expanses of water and sky with mountains soaring in the distance.

To say these scholar's study poem-and-painting scrolls were only escapist would be incorrect. A scholar's study shigajiku aids in evoking an idealized landscape to help the monk bring about a sense of peaceful serenity through which they would write, meditate, reflect, etc. Painters manipulated their surroundings and were forced to use their imagination or memory to create these landscapes that were so far removed from their own setting of a bustling Japanese city. Often looking to the deep mountains valleys one would find in China – these tiny idealists landscapes became a monks’ flight from reality via Chinese inspiration. For these Japanese monks, “incorporating Chinese poetic themes with idealized visions of Chinese landscapes expressed faithful spirituality in a way that simply painting a realistic landscape from their own mundane life could never have done… painted poetry became the image of utopia in the minds of Japanese and Korean elites, whether or not those images looked like the ‘real’ China.”

== Characteristics of Landscape Shigajiku Poem and Painting Scrolls ==
=== Paintings ===
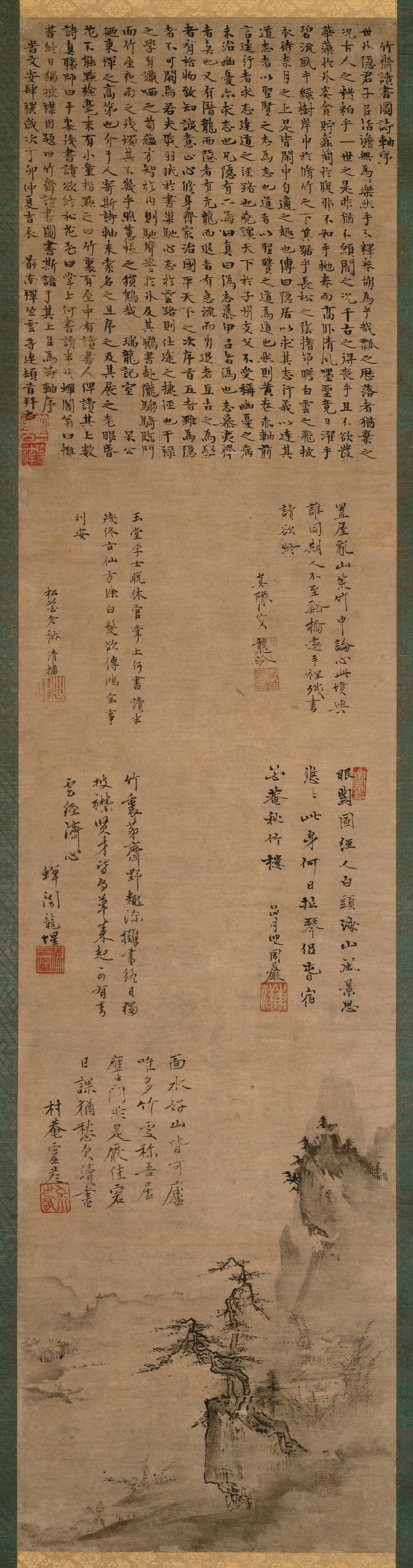
Reading in a Bamboo Grove. Attributed to Shūbun. Tokyo National Museum.

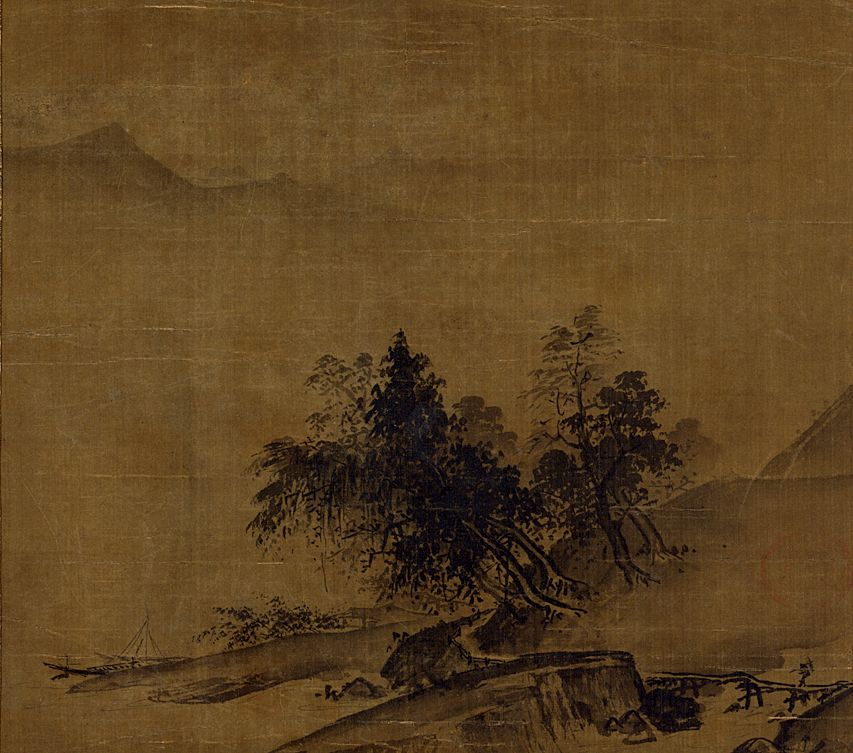
An untitled album leaf by Xia Gui, from the collection of Tokyo National Museum.

The painting of landscape shigajiku encompasses different themes, but almost always includes an idealized landscape representing some imaginary corner of nature. This made it a preferred artform for monks. Ancient crooked pine trees clinging tenaciously to a sheer cliff, hills in the distance, vast expanse of water and sky, this secluded corner of nature were some of the most common tropes of shigajiku.

Historically there were two ways to create the painting of the shigajiku: the “old style” and the “new style.” The “old style” is believed to have derived from the painting traditions of the Northern Sung painters, specifically Guo Xi (1020-1090), where the aesthetic concentrated around balanced and centered compositions. The “new style” is believed to be largely derived from the Southern Sung, specifically Xia Gui (1195–1224), with the central focus of the composition moved into a corner of the scroll to create a dynamic and asymmetrical image. Both of these painting styles originated in China and became the way in which Japanese Zen monks desired to paint their shigajiku.

Reading in a Bamboo Grove encompasses the most common tropes of the shigajiku, the imposing mountains, with sheer cliffs, trees precariously perched near edges, and hints of a vast open horizon. This scholar's study shigajiku is done in the “new style,” and when compared with a composition by Xia Gui, the characteristics of the “new style” become clearer. The positioning of the mountain scene in the corner and the poetic inscriptions above and opposite the image dramatically accentuates the asymmetrical nature of the scroll.

=== Inscriptions ===
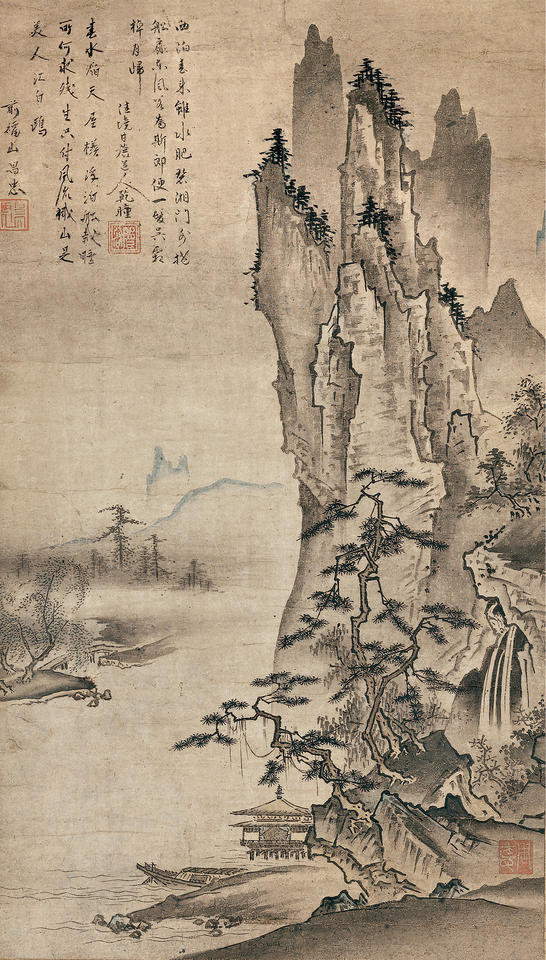
Shūtoku, Early Spring Landscape. Before 1533. Inscribed by Yōkoku Kentō and Teihō Shōchū. Minneapolis Institute of Art.

Five Mountains monks used the shikai or poetry gatherings to discuss, create, and inscribe their poetry onto the scrolls of their fellow monks. The poetic inscription extends no further than 2/3 of the scroll leaving the bottom 1/3 for the painted image. This structuring has led some scholars to argue that the poetry is valued more than painting. The Zen priests inscribing shigajiku were not as concerned with who painted the picture as they were with how successful the painting was in transporting the viewer into an idealistic natural setting. The poetic inscriptions vary in subject matter, referring to the natural poetry of the early century, celebrated works of Chinese poetry, or messages to other monks of greeting, farewell, congratulation, etc. The number of inscriptions varies, but the order in which they were inscribed denotes the prestige of a monk.

Active in 16th century, Shūtoku created a shigajiku entitled Early Spring Landscape. The format of a tall and narrow poem filling one corner and the “new” style of painting filling the opposite corner creates an asymmetry that is characteristic of shigajiku. The asymmetry of the composition and the poetic inscription at the top recalls Shūbun, and the painting also reflects the influence of Sesshū.

The text on the lower right of Early Spring Landscape, authored by Yōkoku Kentō (d. 1533), translates to:

Though the west lake swells with water as spring arrives, / the emerald bamboo outdoors blocks the sight of boats. / Had the east wind facilitated his quest, / he would have returned by boat in moonlight to the frosted land of Wu faraway.

The text on the upper left, authored by Teihō Shōchū (fl. ca. 1538), translates to:

Floating in a boathouse on the brimming spring river, / what could one desire in a sound sleep after mooring? / In nothing but insouciant boating would I spend the rest of my life, / with mountains along the white gull-dotted stream as my beauties.

The poetry of these two different monks both evoke ideas reflected in the painting below it. The natural images of flowing water, trees, and wind are presented as calming. The musings of sleep and dreams suggest the monks' longing to be in such a place, with the solitude and tranquil atmosphere of the landscape providing a setting for contemplation and mental escape. The shigajiku medium enables a level of contemplation in which the surrounding world recedes and nature becomes the primary focus, a state associated with the experience of these city dwelling monks.

== One Composition Interpretation ==
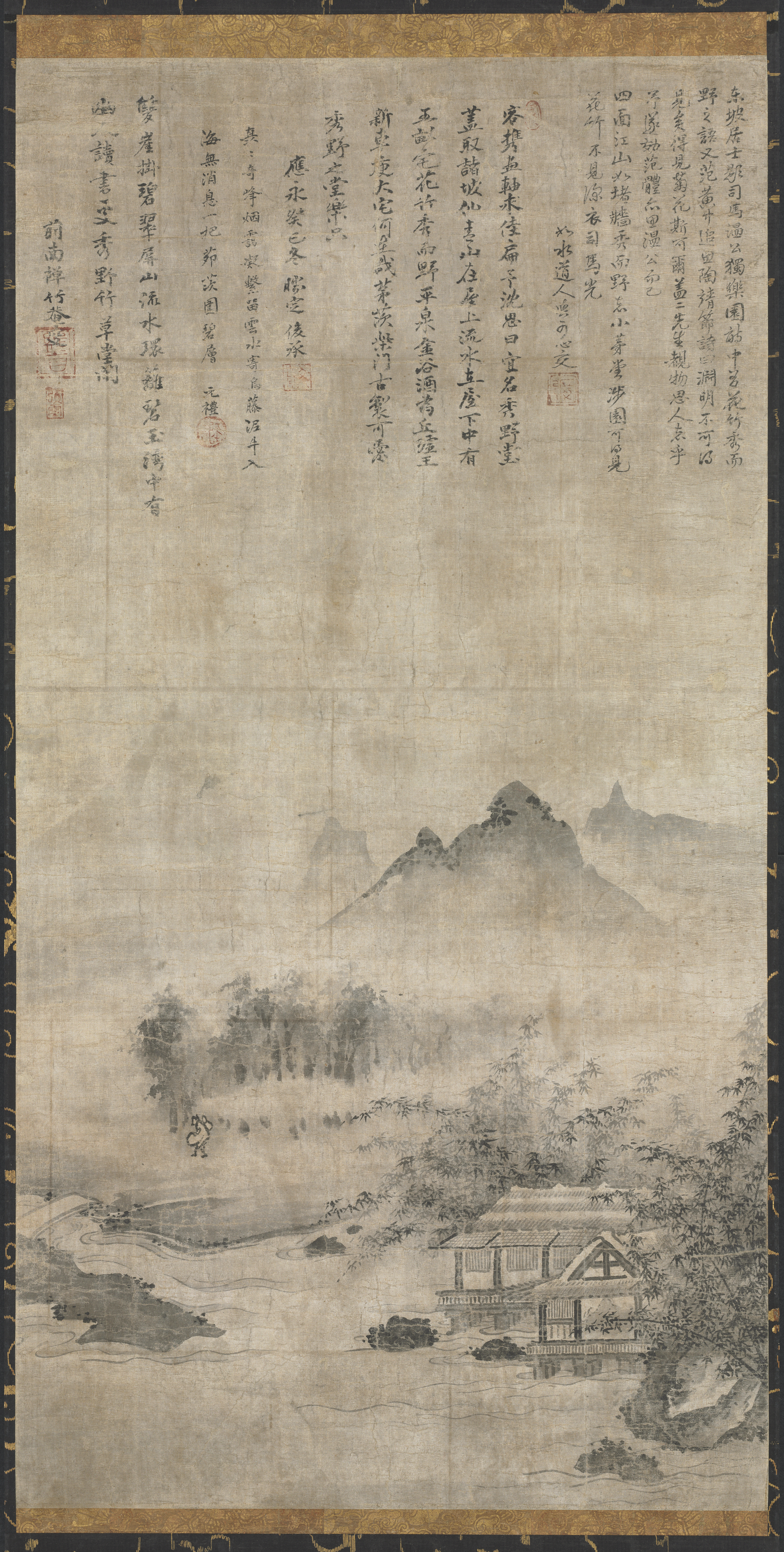
Landscape, 1700s. Hanging scroll; ink and color on silk. Cleveland Museum of Art.

Poem-and-painting scrolls must be understood as a whole piece of art – the meaning of the image is informed by the inscription and vice versa. The unity of the shigajiku scroll is “painting of a poetic idea.” Understanding the two parts of the shigajiku together is vital. Scholar Shimao Arata articulates that together, the painting and inscriptions of shigajiku, form the “four perfections” – poetry, painting, calligraphy, and prose. These “four perfections” express “the mind’s level of spiritual accomplishment, and this spiritual link between the four perfections is itself the subject of the earliest known poem-and-painting scrolls.”

Sesshu, Toyo, Splashed Ink Landscape. 1495. Tokyo National Museum.

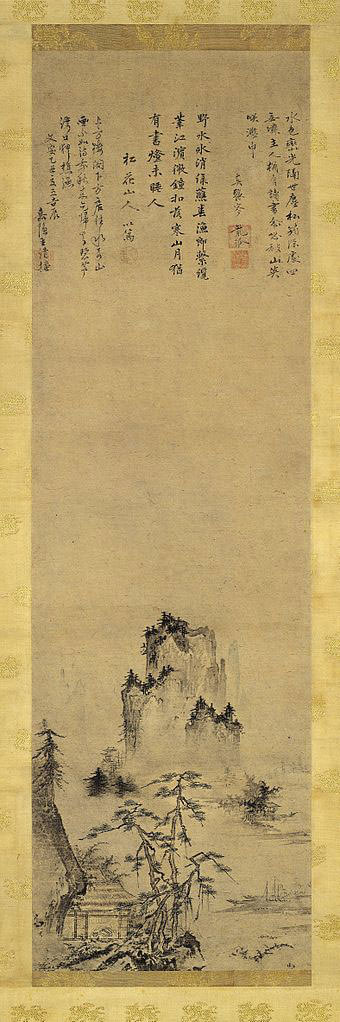
Hue of Water, Light on the Peaks. Attributed to Shūbun. Nara National Museum.

While the idea of poetry and painting influencing and changing the overall meaning of a composition preexisted the creation of shigajiku – it has become a concept fundamental to ascertain the meaning of a shigajiku. The first shigajiku, Newly Risen Moon over a Brushwood Gate, follows “the classic formulation of the relation between poetry and painting developed by Su Shih and his circle, which we have seen also was a crucial factor in the rise of the earliest Japanese poem-and-painting scrolls around.” Poem-and-painting scrolls were intended, from the beginning of their production, to be understood as a whole piece of art with different mediums (“four perfections”) used to convey a single artwork.

Landscape

This scroll was once thought to be an early example of a shigajiku depicting the genre of a landscape and the theme of a scholar’s study. More recently, it has been recognized as a work of the Edo period. The inscriptions are quotations from essays on Sima Guang 司马光(1019-1086) by the Chinese Song-dynasty literatus Su Shi苏轼 (1037-1101) One interpretation of the quotations' use above this painted image is that the scholar's studio depicted is “surrounded with bamboo as a metaphor for the garden of Sima, the Song dynasty scholar-official who, in imitation of the Tang poet Bai Juyi白居易, enjoyed the garden in isolation during his exile in Luoyang洛阳.” In this interpretation, the connection between the quotation and the painting is clear – the painting informs the selected inscription and the inscription informs the painting.

Hue of Water, Light on the Peaks

The scholarly retreat depicted on the scroll shows and idyllic and peaceful setting surrounded by nature. The poem is named by the first characters of the first poem, suishoku rankō, a phrase that can be literally translated as “hue of the water, light on the peaks.” Again this connection highlights the importance of “reading” the composition as one piece of art, instead of multiple pieces of art painting, poetry, and calligraphy. The dynamism of the ink painting can be seen through the “arrangement of various elements in this work lacks concision and a sense of three-dimensional space in its execution.” The scholar’s study in the center of the painting is offset by the commanding motif of the three pine trees and looming mountain in the background. This structural ambiguity can be seen as an attempt to render a scholars retreat that is truly separate from reality, “this painting is an excellent example of the art produced within the cultural sphere of Zen Buddhism, which shunned the worldly realm.”

Splashed Ink Landscape

With the dedicatory inscription at the top of the scroll written by Sesshū himself, Sesshū’s scroll slowly reveals itself to the reader. The “unconsummated, intuited nature of the Splashed Ink Landscape has led many commentators to interpret Sesshu's painting as embodying or pictorializing the principles of Zen Buddhism.” The unrestrained nature of this work speaks to the enlightened ideal of the Zen tradition, while maintaining the tropes of the suggested mountains, surrounding water, and trees.

== See also ==
- Buddhist art in Japan
- National Treasure (Japan)
- Japanese poetry
