= Li Chi-mao =

Chinese ink painter

Lee Chi-mao (Chinese: 李奇茂, March 22, 1925 – May 24, 2019), born Li Yuntai (李雲台) and self-proclaimed " the owner of the Cai Feng Tang (采風堂主)," was a Chinese ink painter from Woyang County, Anhui Province (now Lixin County). In his early years, he primarily created works with a distinctive literary and artistic style related to battle. Later, he gradually shifted to themes depicting the customs and people of Taiwan, as well as engaging in experimental new ink painting creations.

== Life ==
=== Chinese Period ===
In 1934, Lee Chi-mao's father, Li Guanying (李冠英), invited the county high school teacher Lu Huashi (陸化石) to teach Lee Chi-mao the fundamentals of ink painting. Lu used the "Manual of the Mustard Seed Garden (Jieziyuan Huapu, 芥子園畫譜)" as the teaching material. He often took students to folk temples to observe painted stories on the walls, inspiring Lee Chi-mao to excel in Buddhist painting from a young age. While Lee Chi-mao was learning to paint, his mother was often nearby engaged in weaving, making the figure of the "mother" at work a recurring theme in his later works. After the outbreak of the Second Sino-Japanese War, Lee Chi-mao, in 1941, evacuated to Shanghai and Nanjing with fellow villagers, where he joined the recruitment for the National Army's armored forces and later changed his name to "Lee Chi-mao".

=== Taiwan Period ===
In 1949, Lee Chi-mao came to Taiwan with the military, and the following year (1950), he held a solo exhibition at the Zhongshan Hall.He entered the Political Warfare Cadres Academy's Art Department (now the Department of Applied Arts at the National Defense University, Fengxinggang Campus), receiving comprehensive art education. Influenced by teachers Liang Dingming (梁鼎銘), Liang Zhongming (梁中銘), and Liang Youming (梁又銘), Lee Chi-mao's early works were mostly politically motivated. After graduating in 1957, Lee Chi-mao was assigned to serve in Kinmen, experiencing the August 23 Artillery Battle. During his time in Kinmen, he depicted the landscapes and war scenes as artworks. In 1958, he held his second solo exhibition at Zhongshan Hall and was appointed as a full-time teacher in the Art Department of Fengxinggang Academy the following year (1959).

Starting from 1964, Lee Chi-mao, in order to promote Chinese art and culture, began organizing exhibitions in various countries, exploring famous landscapes, experiencing local customs, and realizing that paintings should possess national, temporal, and unique characteristics. Therefore, his works gradually changed in terms of subject matter, technique, and visual perception from 1970 onwards. In 1970s saw Lee Chi-mao depicting rural scenes such as "water buffalo" and "shepherd" from his childhood memories' Utopian world. Simultaneously, he delved into capturing the folk customs and people of modern Taiwan, including night markets, banquets, and Taipei MRT passengers, becoming his main creative direction. In 1970, Lee Chi-mao named his study "Cai Feng Tang (采風堂)" and dubbed himself "the owner of the Cai Feng Tang (采風堂主)".

In his later years, Lee Chi-mao continued to create art, travel for exhibitions worldwide, engage in art education, and promote cultural exchange. He died on May 24, 2019.

== Important exhibitions and awards ==
• 1962: Awarded the Golden Statue at the 5th National Art Exhibition

• 1966: Received the 10th Republic of China Literary and Art Association Art Award and the 2nd Zhongshan Academic and Cultural Creative Art Award

• 1973: Awarded the Cultural Contribution Award by the Ministry of Education's Cultural Bureau

• 1982: Honored with the 7th National Art Special Award

• 1987: November 29 declared as Lee Chi-mao Day in San Francisco, USA, making him the first Chinese to receive such recognition

• 2001: Awarded the Culture and Arts Contribution Medal – Gold Medal by the Executive Yuan's Council for Cultural Affairs

== Honors ==
Republic of China Decorations and Medals – First Class Medal for the Army, Navy, and Air Force (awarded in 2014).
