= Taizō-in =

Buddhist sub-temple in Kyoto, Japan

Taizō-in 退蔵院
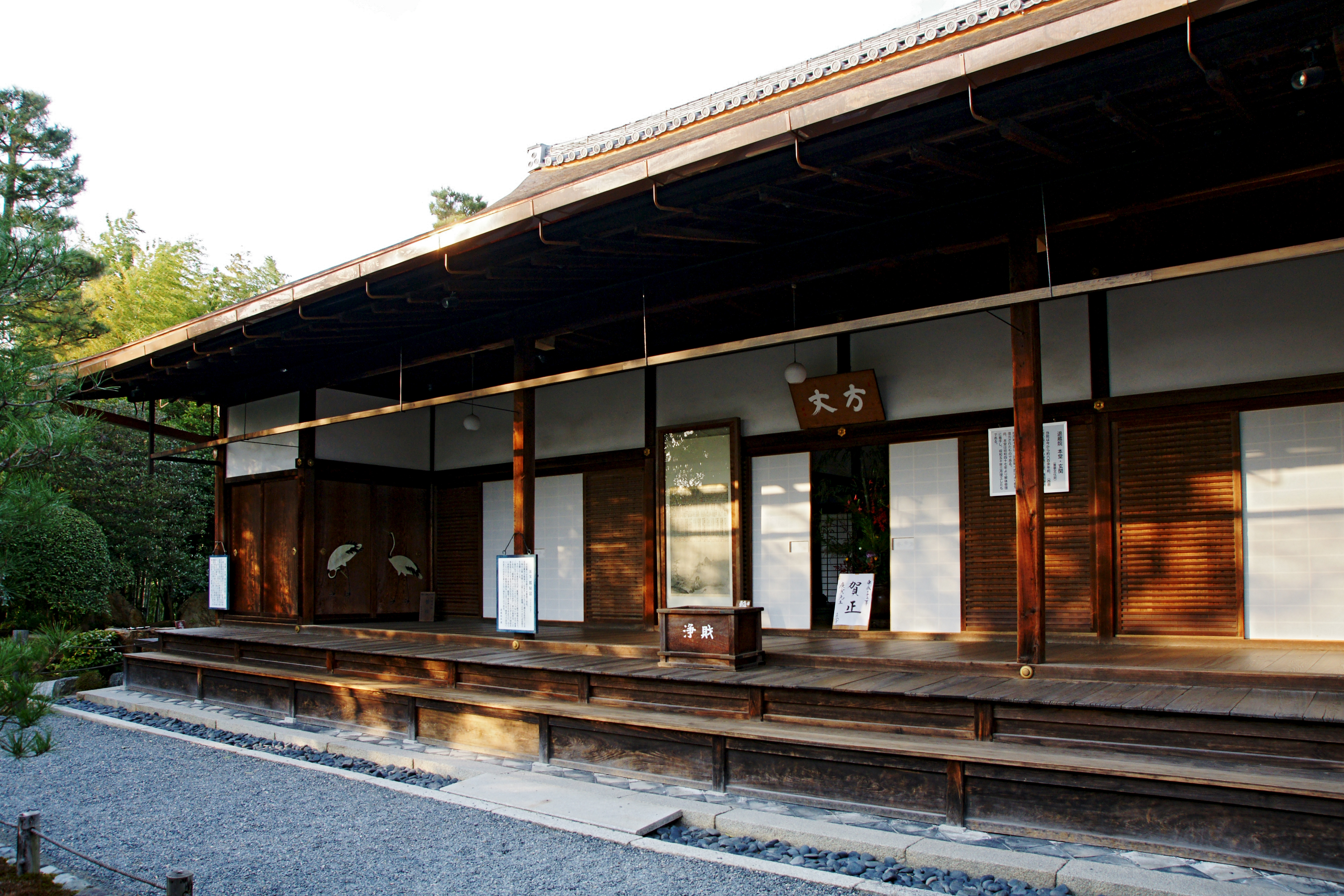
- Taizō-in Hōjō

- Taizō-in Taizō-in (Japan)

Religion
- Affiliation: Buddhist
- Rite: Rinzai school Myōshin-ji branch

Location
- Location: 35 Hanazono-Jinomakacho, Ukyō-ku, Kyoto-shi, Kyoto-fu
- Country: Japan
- Interactive map of Taizō-in 退蔵院
- Coordinates: 35°1′18.76″N 135°43′9.24″E

Architecture
- Founder: Hatano Shigemichi
- Completed: 1404
- National Place of Scenic Beauty National Historic Site of Japan

Catching catfish with a gourd (Hyōnen-zu) by Josetsu (National Treasure)

Taizō-in (退蔵院) is one of the tatchū (塔頭) sub-temples of Myōshin-ji, a Rinzai school Zen Buddhist temple in the Hanazono neighborhood of Ukyō-ku in the city of Kyoto, Japan. It is one of the few of Myōshin-ji's sub-temples which are normally open to the public.

== Overview ==
The temple was founded in 1404 by Hatano Shigemichi, a local warlord from Echizen Province, in the Senbon-dori Matsubara neighborhood of Kyoto, with third head of Myōshin-ji, Muin Sōin (無因宗), as its founder. It was later moved to the grounds of Myōshin-ji by Niho Soshun. It was destroyed (along with the rest of Myōshin-ji during the Ōnin War, but was rebuilt in 1597 by Kinen Zenyu, a devoted devotee of Emperor Go-Nara.

The temple is entered from the east via a simple gate. The abbot's residence (方丈, Hōjō), completed in 1602, is usually not open to the public. The fusuma sliding screen paintings inside were painted by artist Murabayashi Yuki in 2022. Previously, there were paintings by Kanō Ryōkei (a senior disciple of Kanō Mitsunobu), a painter of the Kanō school in the late Momoyama period, but as they had deteriorated significantly, they were replaced by Murabayashi's paintings. The building is a National Important Cultural Property. Adjacent to the Hōjō to the north is the Shoin, which also includes a Japanese tea ceremony room called the "Kakoi-no-seki". Adjacent to the Hōjō to the west is a small Karesansui Japanese dry garden, and to the south is an extensive garden called the Motonobu's Garden (元信の庭, Motonobu no niwa).

Taizō-in holds one of Japan's oldest ink paintings, Catching catfish with a gourd (紙本墨画淡彩瓢鮎図, hyōnen-zu), c. 1413, by Josetsu (如拙), which is a National Treasure of Japan. It is identified as a turning point in Muromachi painting, and represents a Zen koan.

== Taizō-in Garden ==
This is dry landscape garden said to have been created by Kanō Motonobu (1476–1559), the founder of the Kanō school, and who was better known as a painter. It contains many features numerous garden stones arranged in a dynamic way, including one representing Mount Hōrai, and a dry waterfall flowing into the ocean is expressed using white sand. The planting is mostly evergreen, including camellia, pine, and Japanese umbrella pine. It covers 50 tsubo (170 m^{2}) and was designed to integrate a borrowing of scenery ("shakkei") of a view of Narabigaoka Hill in the distance. The garden was designated a National Historic Site and National Place of Scenic Beauty in 1931.

A new pond garden, or yoko-en, was designed by Kinsaku Nakane in 1963–1966. The new garden is large enough for visitors to walk in, and contains azaleas and a stream that cascades along the main axis, directly toward the main viewing position. The stream flows around rocks, gradually widening until it empties into a pool in front of the viewer.

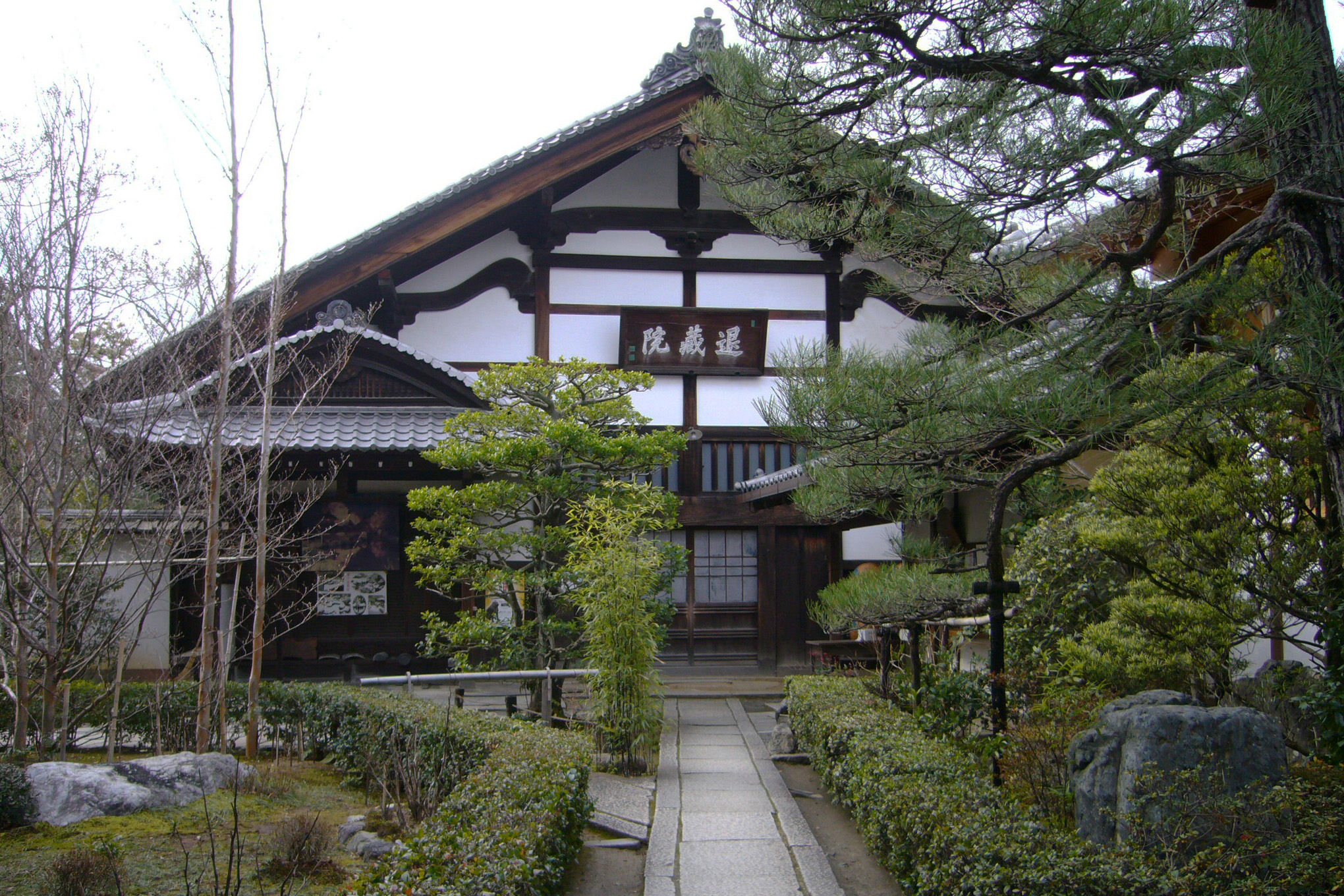
Kuri

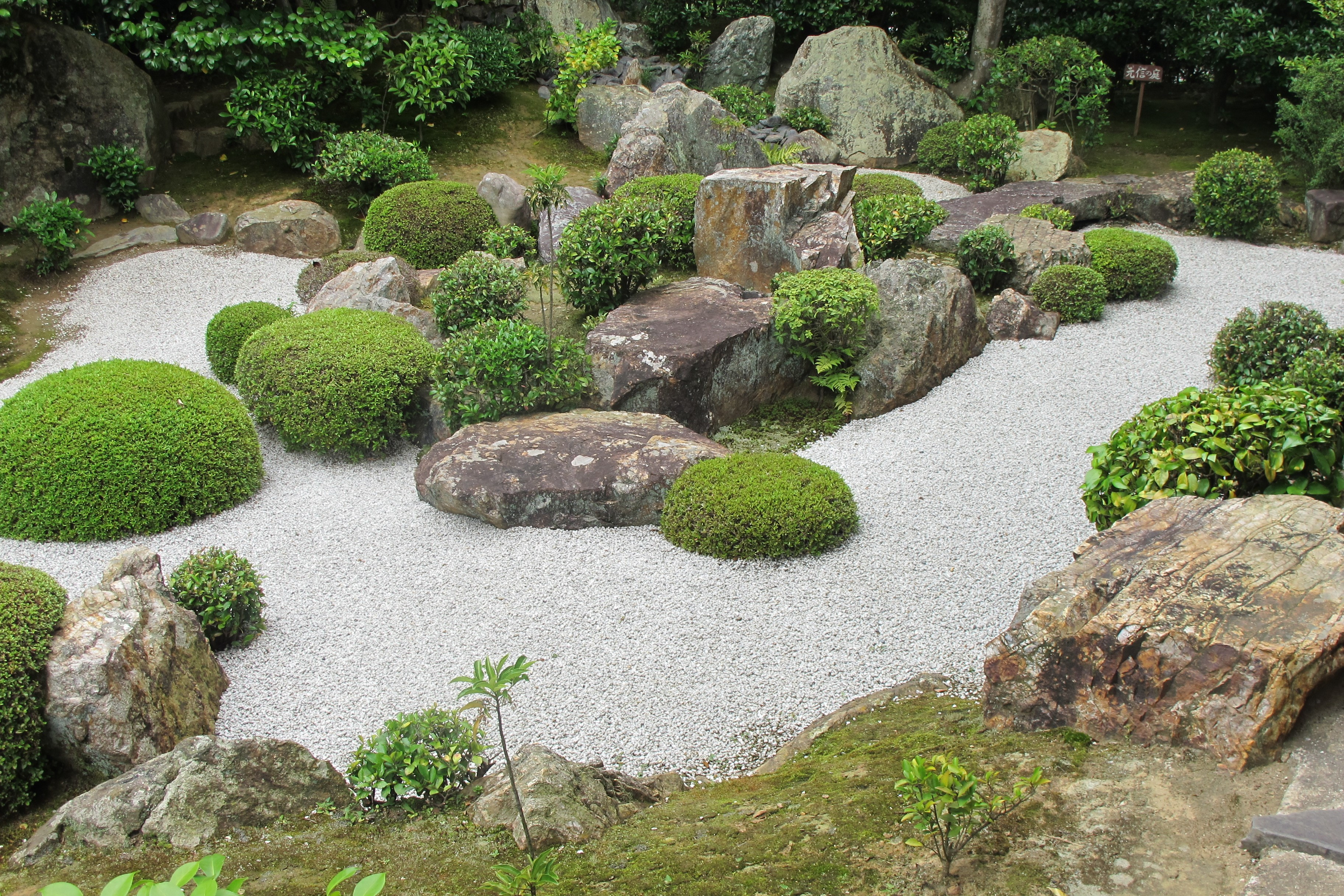
Motonobu's Garten

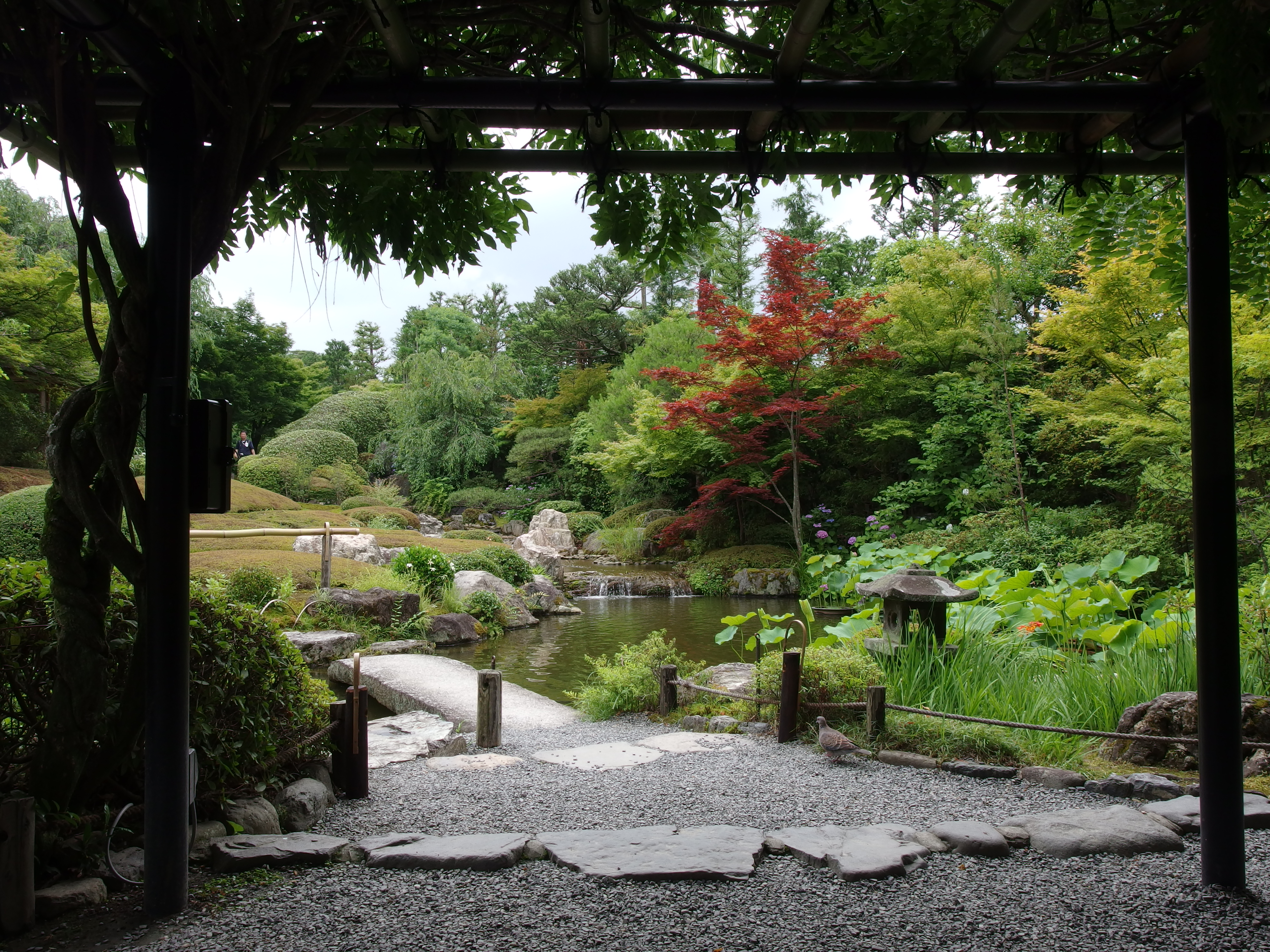
Motonobu-no-niwa

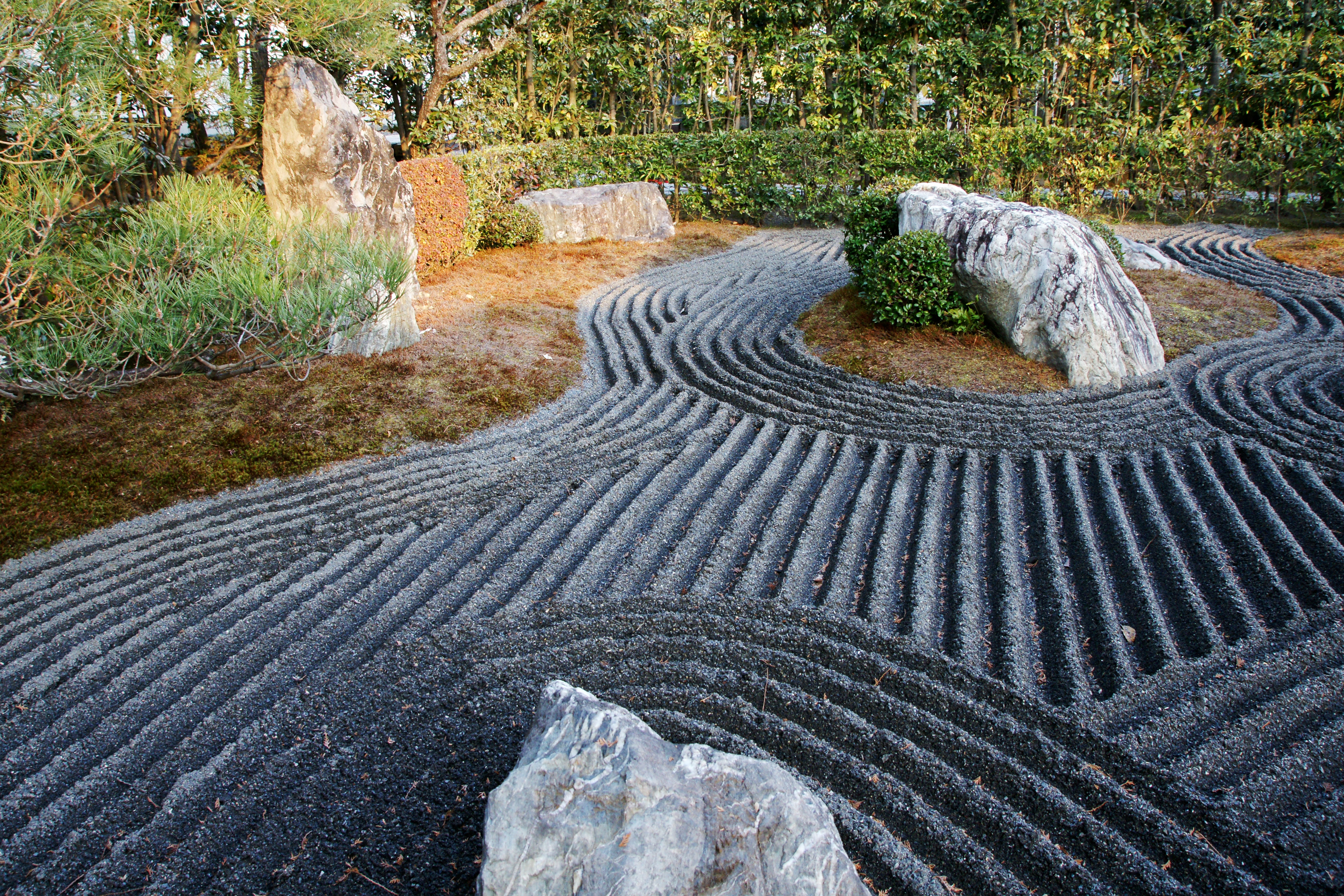
Taizō-in Garden

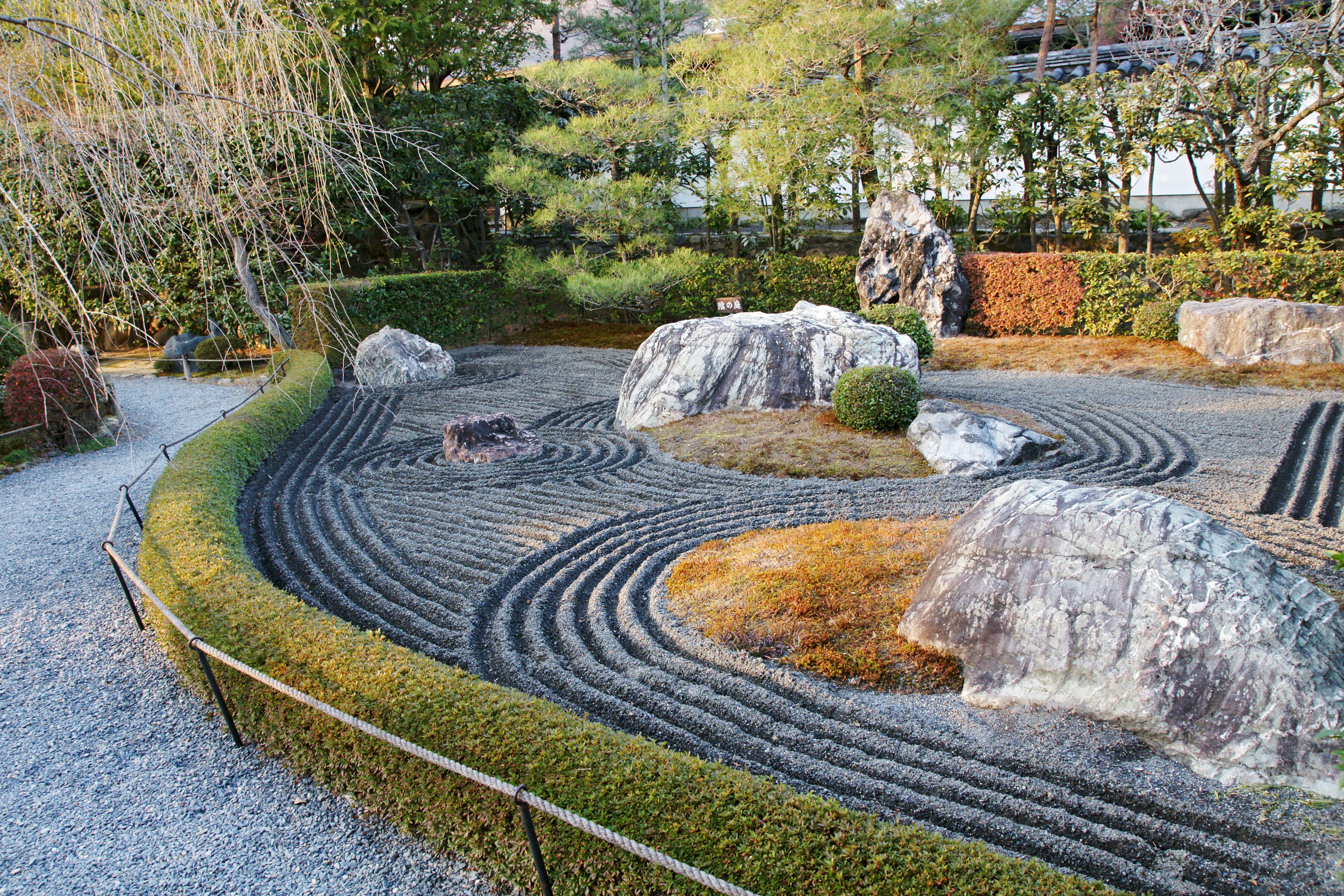
Taizō-in Garden

Taizō-in is located a ten-minute walk from Hanazono Station on the JR West Sagano Line.

== See also ==
- List of Historic Sites of Japan (Kyoto)
- List of Places of Scenic Beauty of Japan (Kyoto)
