= Buddhist painting =

Painting that can be used in Buddhist worship and rituals

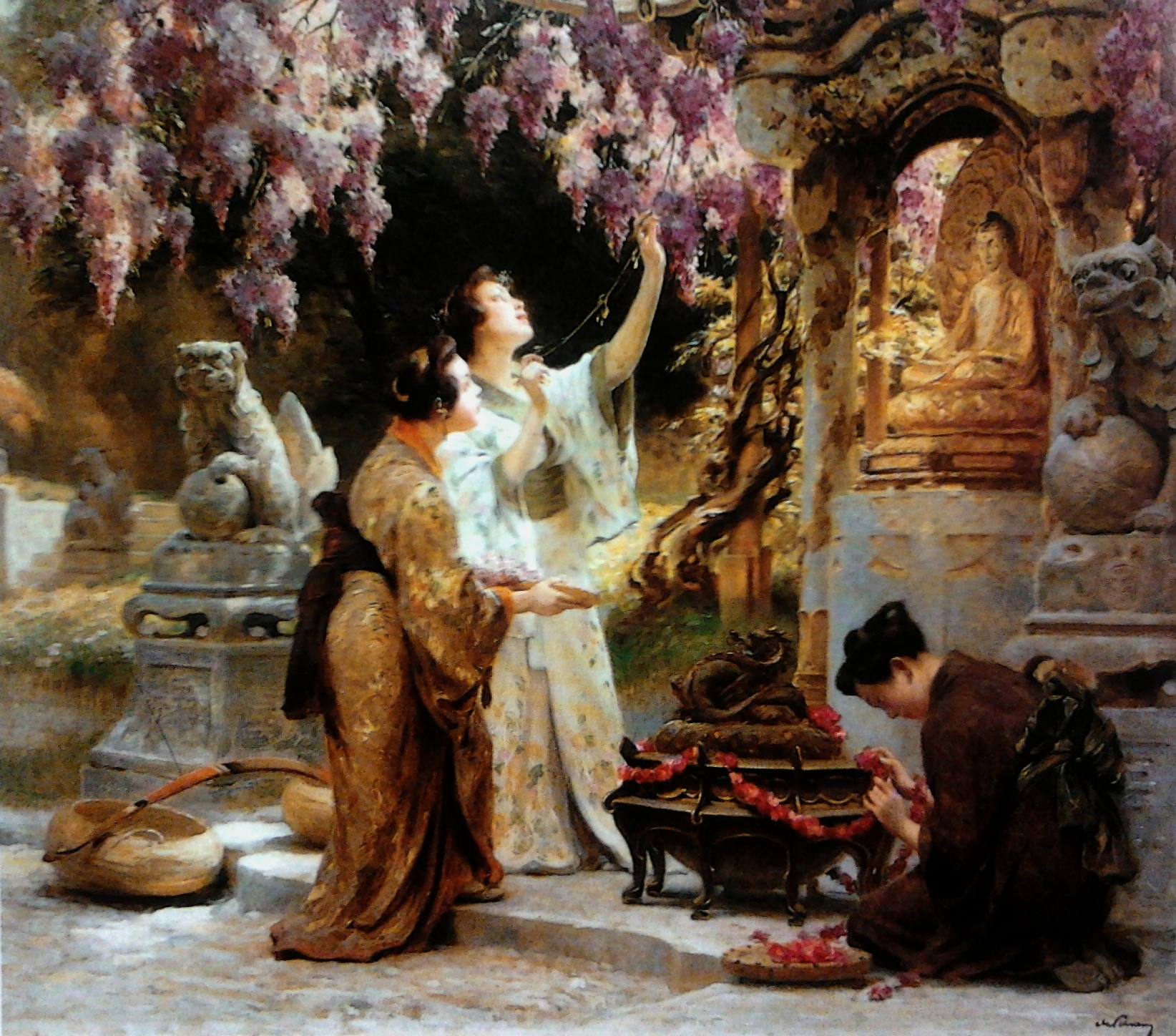
Artistic depiction of women offering devotional worship to The Buddha by Alois Hans Schram c. 1897

Buddhist painting, Butsuga (仏画) in a broad sense, refers to Buddhist paintings in general, including Buddhist biographies, Jataka tales, Pure Land variant paintings (such as Taima mandala), Raigō, Buddhist narrative paintings such as the Two Rivers White Path and Six Paths paintings, Ancestors biographies, Emaki, E-toki, Taenghwa, Ancestors drawings, Chinsō portraits of Zen monks, and portraits of ordinary monks. Chinsō, portraits of Zen monks, and portraits of ordinary monks.

Narrowly defined, a painting used in the worship and rituals of Buddhism, especially esoteric sects. Paintings (single or group) depicting the Buddha (Tathāgata), Bodhisattvas, ancient Indian gods, Chinese and Japanese gods, and other deities worshipped in Buddhism, as well as Mandala of the Two Realms, Mandala of the Separate Realms, etc.

Buddhist paintings include not just framed paintings but also include mandalas, hanging scrolls, and prints

== See also ==
- Kirikane - The decorative techniques of Buddhist painting handed down from the Asuka period
- Silken Painting of Emperor Go-Daigo
