= Namazu =

Japanese mythical creature

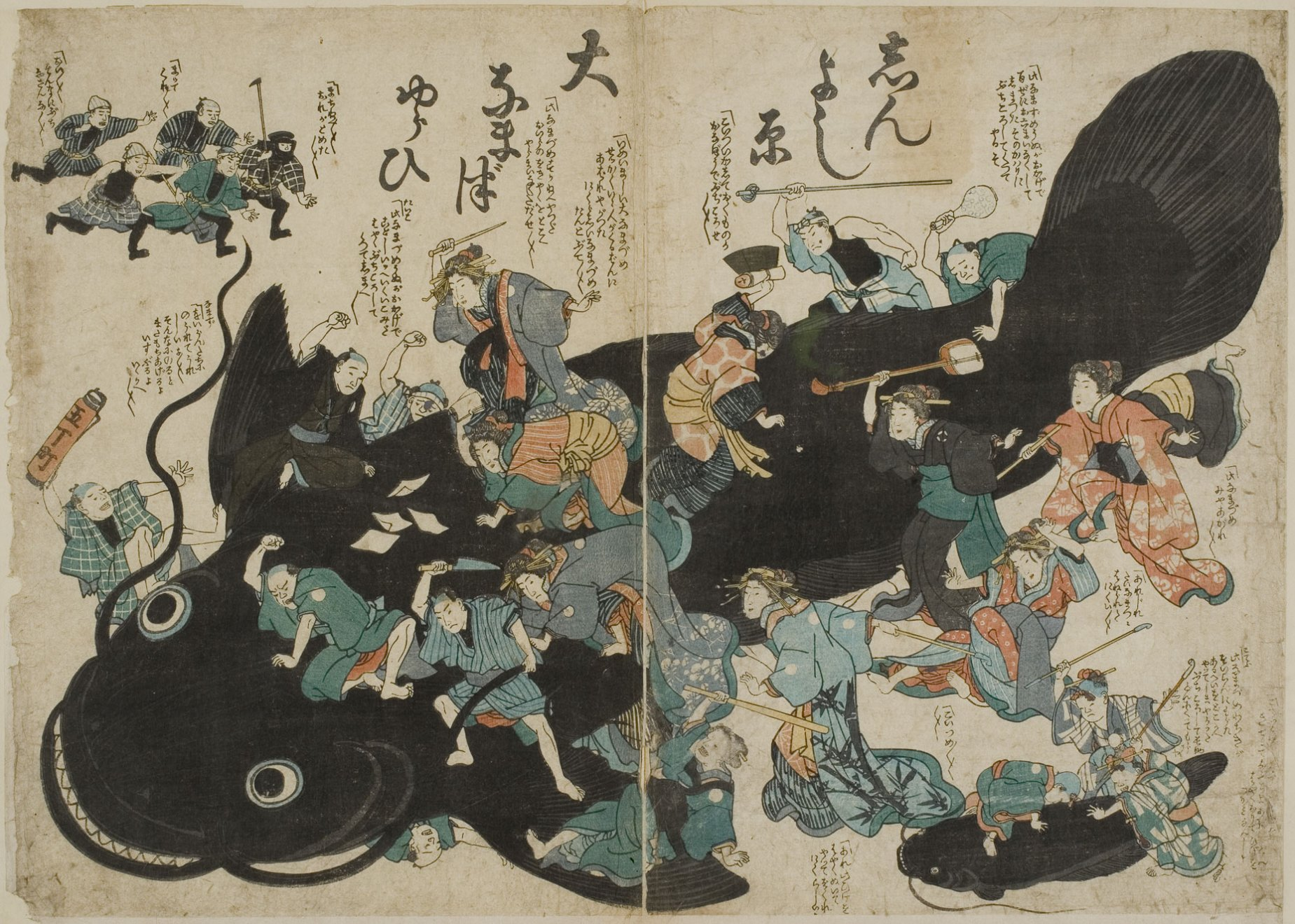
An image of humans battling a Namazu

In Japanese mythology, the Namazu (鯰) or Ōnamazu (大鯰) is a giant underground catfish that causes earthquakes.

The creature lives under the islands of Japan and is guarded by the god Takemikazuchi enshrined at Kashima, who restrains the catfish with a stone. When the Kashima-god lets his guard fall, Namazu thrashes about, causing violent earthquakes.

== Myth ==
The legend or myth in Japan is that a gigantic namazu (catfish) lives inside or beneath the earth (or in the mud) which causes earthquakes.

The association of the namazu with earthquake seems to have first occurred in the area around Lake Biwa, around the 16th century. The namazu had been depicted in the Ōtsu-e ("pictures from the city of Otsu") which were manufactured in that area. (Note: Ōtsu-e are regarded as precursors to ukiyo-e.)

This earthquake-causing creature became associated with the deity and "foundation stone" in Kashima, Ibaraki. According to myth, the god Takemikazuchi enshrined at Kashima restrains the catfish underneath a stone (要石, kaname-ishi, perhaps "foundation stone" but maybe more aptly "cap stone"). When the Kashima-god lets his guard fall, Namazu thrashes about, causing violent earthquakes.

=== Explanation ===
Widespread connections between catfish and earthquakes in Japan were not present until the late 17th century, and only rose to popularity as symbolically causing or predicting earthquakes during the 19th century. Prior to the 1855 Edo earthquake, an eel fisherman reportedly spotted unusually active catfish in a river, which he took as a predictor of an earthquake. Later that night, the earthquake struck. The anecdote, recorded in an 1856 chronicle of journalistic reporting on the earthquake, is the earliest known claim that catfish can naturally predict earthquakes. In the 1930s, Japanese seismologists Shinkishi Hatai and Noboru Abe demonstrated that catfish in aquaria showed increased agitation several hours before earthquakes occurred, and were able to predict quakes with 80% accuracy.

== History ==
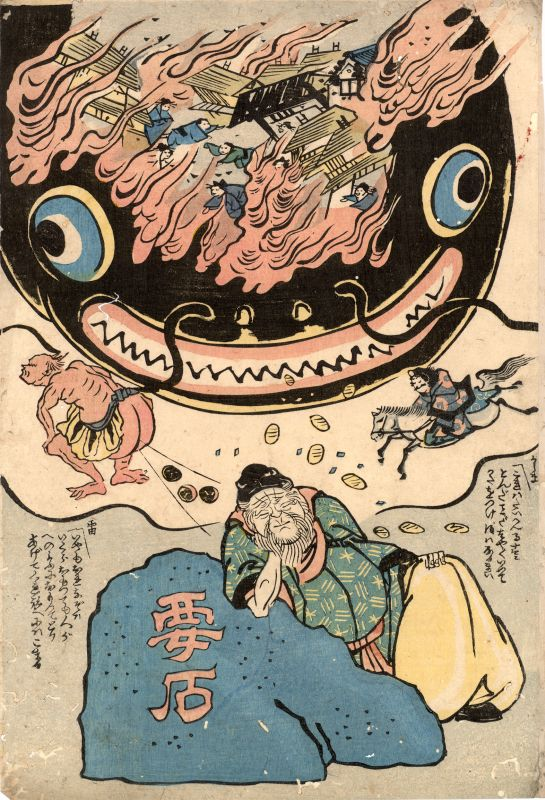
Ebisu falls asleep guarding the stone for Kajima, who returns belated on horseback. Kaminari creating thunder from the posterior.

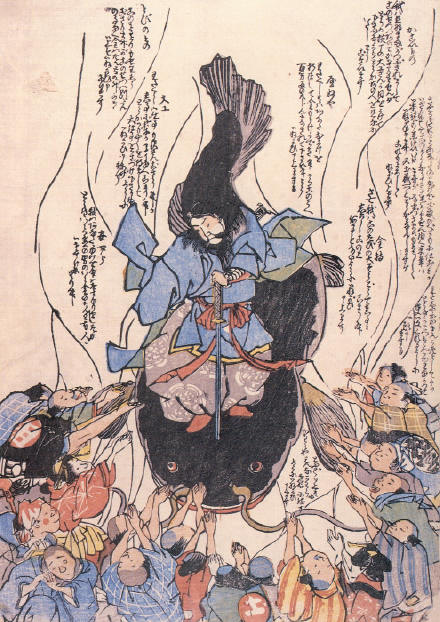
Kashima controls the namazu.

=== Namazu-e ===
Namazu-e (鯰絵; "catfish prints") were a known item in the 19th century, and these broadsides were printed in great quantity following the 1855 earthquake near Edo (modern day Tokyo), one of the Ansei great earthquakes.

These namazu-e woodblock-prints encompass a large variety of scenes, typically depicting the god subduing the earthquake-causing catfish under a sword or the kanameishi stone. The creature is sometimes referred to as just the "earthquake fish" (jishin-no-uo), and despite the text calling it a catfish, the illustration may be that of a dragon-serpent.

Even though the Namazu was held responsible for the disaster, (Note: And even referred to as norakura namazu ("good-for-nothing namazu") for being such an opportunist catching the gods off-guard.) it was also ironically hailed as a yonaoshi daimyōjin (god of "world rectification"), that is to say, a sort of an "avenger of social injustice" which expressed the public's political sentiment at the time. The rich had hoarded their wealth but these were largely disgorged due to the earthquake, and redistributed to the world at large: such is the symbolism of the large gold coins (koban, etc.) scattered by the earthquake depicted in the pictures. A large amount of money went into the rebuilding effort, and the job opportunities resulted in a redistribution of wealth.

One documented origin of a namazu-e series involves the artist Kawanabe Kyōsai, who illustrated a catfish sketch to accompany an account of the 1855 earthquake written by the author Kanagaki Robun; this print is considered Kyōsai's first single-sheet ukiyo-e woodblock print. Its commercial success led Robun to commission a further sequence of catfish images.

One picture is printed with a jingle with the refrain "yo-naoshi, yo-naoshi, tate-naoshi" (literally "world-fixing, world-fixing, re-building", which explicitly makes this connection.

== Modern use ==
- Catfish are depicted on pictures of emergency earthquake preparedness activities in Japan. For example, the Earthquake Early Warning (EEW) logo by the Japan Meteorological Agency utilizes pictures of the catfish on devices capable of issuing an early warning. The popular earthquake early warning mobile application Yurekuru Call also has a catfish as their icon.
- The Open-Source Seismic Hazard Analysis (OpenSHA) software platform has used a catfish logo since its publication to an SVN repository circa 2008.
- The Pokémon Whiscash, named "Namazun" in Japan, resembles a catfish and has "Earthquake" as its signature move. An episode of the Pokémon anime featuring Whiscash was scheduled to air on November 4, 2004, but was skipped over after the 2004 Chūetsu earthquake.
- The Namazu was featured in the episode of River Monsters, "Cold-Blooded Horror".
- Namazu appears in a crossover comic book featuring Stan Sakai's Usagi Yojimbo and IDW's Teenage Mutant Ninja Turtles.
- The Namazu are a race that resemble short, chubby, bipedal catfish in Final Fantasy XIV: Stormblood. The player can undertake crafting and gathering quests for them, or fight Namazu that have forsaken "civilized" garments and have taken up banditry.
- In S1:E7 of Dragon Ball GT, the character Zoonama appears as a giant catfish that wiggles his whiskers when detecting earthquakes, and repeats the word "Namazu" in his speech.
- The myth of Namazu and a scroll of namazu-e is referenced throughout the 2022 Japanese animated fantasy film of Makoto Shinkai, Suzume.

== Gallery ==
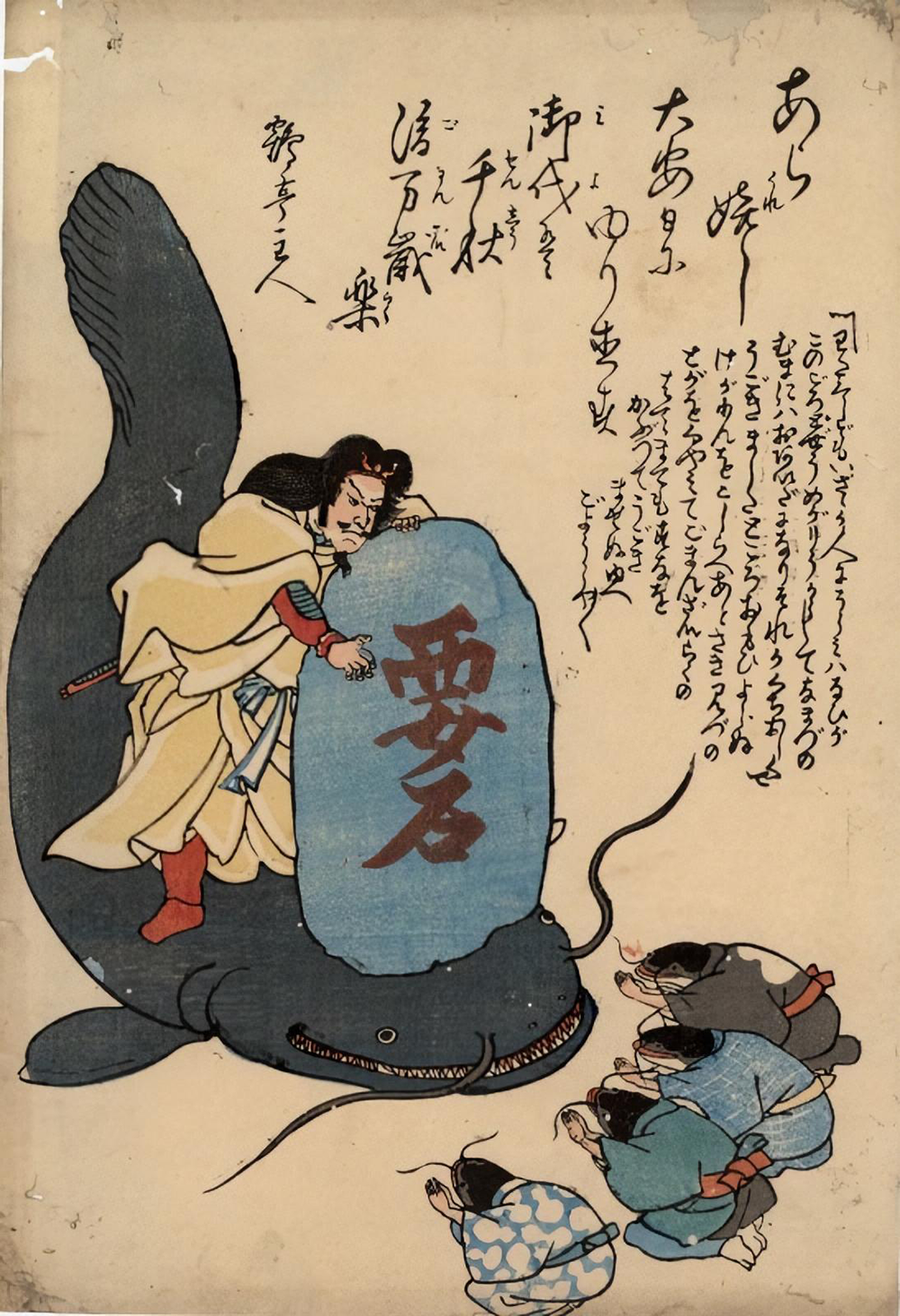
Takemikazuchi pins down a catfish (namazu) with a spirit stone (kaname-ishi) to prevent earthquakes 1855.

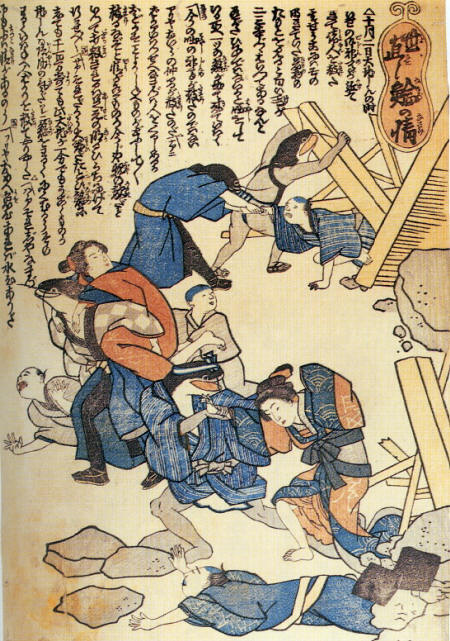
Namazu the savior

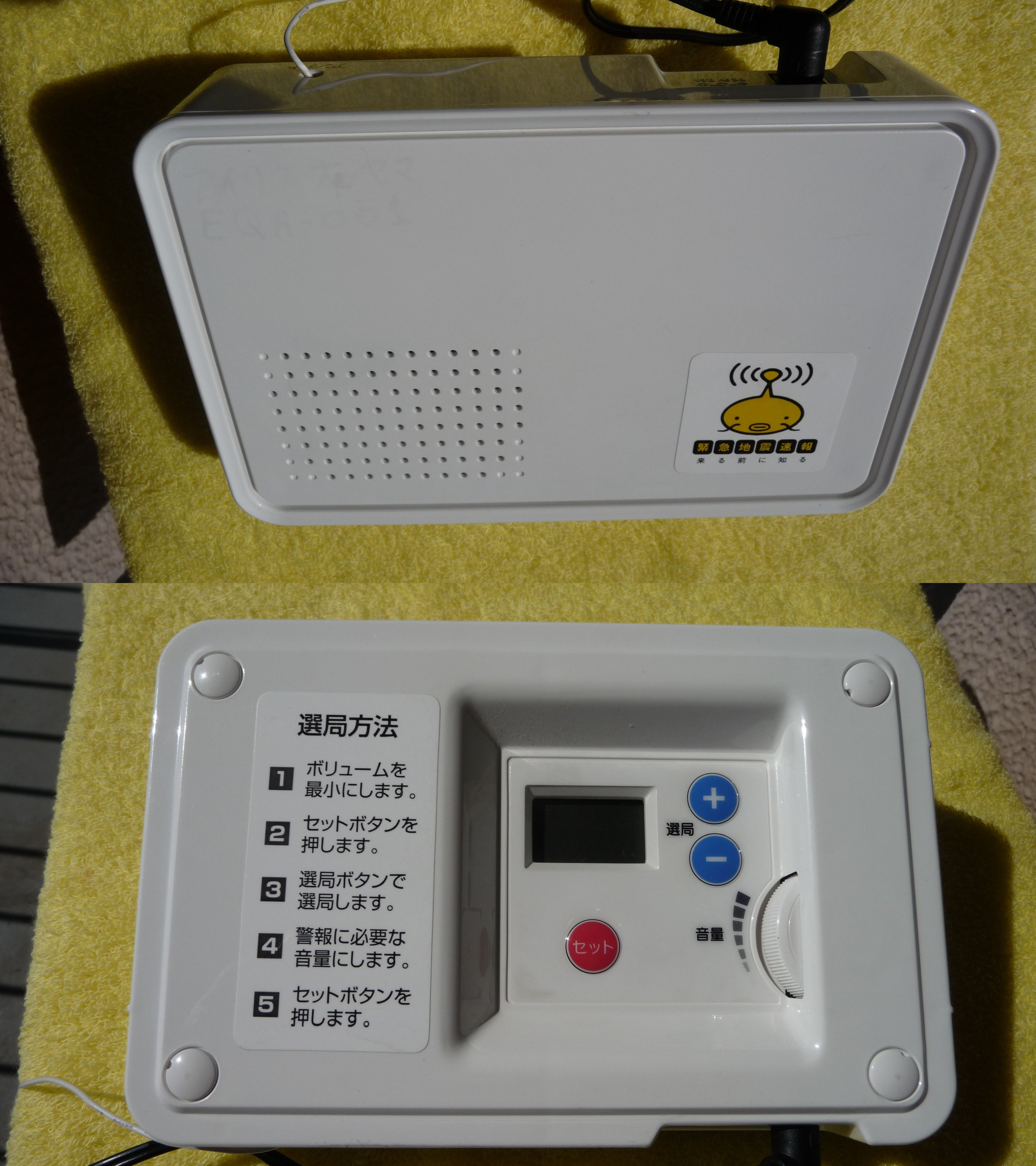
Earthquake Early Warning FM Radio containing an EEW Namazu logo (lower right of top photo)
