= Josetsu =

Japanese painter (1405–1496)

Catching catfish with a gourd (Hyōnen-zu) by Josetsu

Josetsu (如拙, fl. 1405–1496) was one of the first suiboku (ink wash) style Zen Japanese painters in the Muromachi Period (15th century). He was probably also a teacher of Tenshō Shūbun at the Shōkoku-ji monastery in Kyoto.

The best known of his paintings belongs to Taizō-in, a sub-temple of Myōshin-ji in Kyoto, which is entitled Catching a Catfish with a Gourd (c. 1413). It shows a comical-looking man fishing against a background of a winding river and a bamboo grove. It is thought to have been inspired by a riddle set by the Ashikaga shōgun, "How do you catch a catfish with a gourd?" It can be viewed as a piece of Zen humour, or as a kōan in visual form designed to provoke the viewer into new ways of "seeing". Josetsu was an amazing figure in ink painting at that period of time and also influenced many painters as well.

== See also ==
- Tenshō Shūbun
- Japanese painting
