= Tenshō Shūbun =

Japanese monk and painter

Reading in a Bamboo Grove (1446)

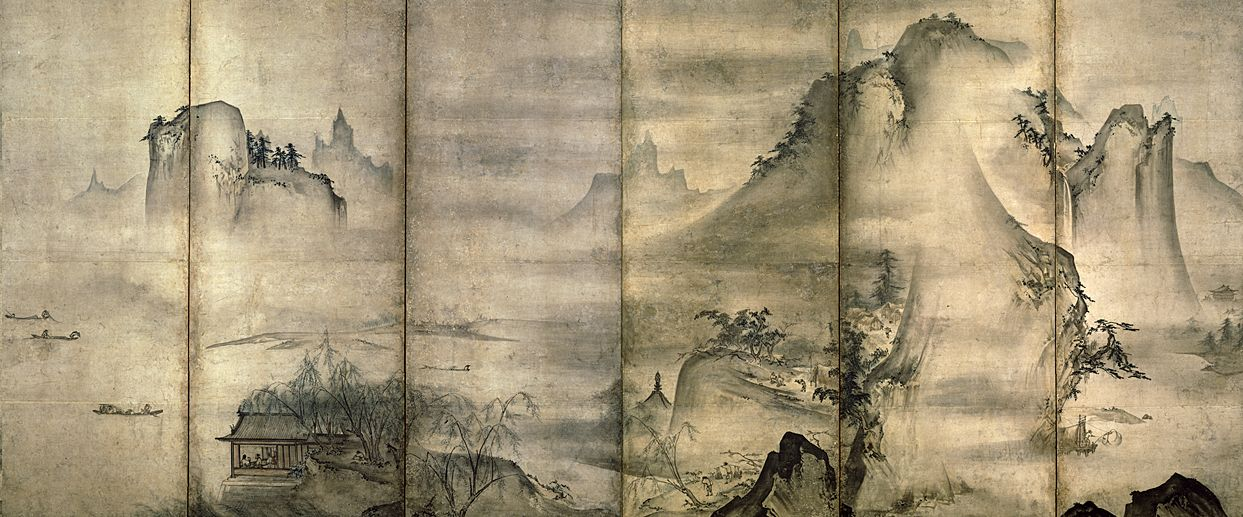
Landscape of the Four Seasons in the collection of Tokyo National Museum, attributed to Shūbun

Tenshō Shūbun (天章 周文; died c. 1444–50) was a Japanese Zen Buddhist monk and painter of the Muromachi period.

== Biography ==
Shūbun was born in the late 14th century in Ōmi Province and became a professional painter around 1403. He settled in Kyoto, then the capital city. He became director of the court painting bureau, established by Ashikaga shōguns, which consisted of influential art patrons. He was chosen by the members of the diplomatic mission to Joseon in 1423.

Shūbun is considered to be the founder of the Chinese style of suiboku ink painting in Japan. He was influenced by Chinese landscape painters Xia Gui and Ma Yuan.

Throughout his life, Shūbun was associated with the Zen Buddhist temple, Shōkoku-ji. Early in his career, he studied painting there under Josetsu, a Chinese immigrant who became the father of the new Japanese ink painting tradition. Under Josetsu's influence, Shūbun started studying Chinese Song dynasty painting by masters such as Xia Gui and Ma Yuan; consequently, Shūbun's style was an intermediate step between early Japanese artists who imitated Chinese models very closely, and later artists, who developed a national style. Later in life, Shūbun became overseer of buildings and grounds at Shōkoku-ji.

In the 1440s he taught the young Sesshū Tōyō, who became his best pupil and the most highly regarded Japanese artist of his time. Another important pupil may have been Kanō Masanobu, who succeeded Shūbun as the chief painter of the Ashikaga shogunate, and also founded the Kanō school of painting.

Shūbun's most well-known painting, designated as a National Treasure in Japan, is Reading in a Bamboo Grove, now kept in the Tokyo National Museum. The same museum houses a few other works attributed to Shūbun, among them a pair of folding screens (屏風, byōbu) titled Landscape of Four Seasons (四季山水図屏風, Shiki sansui zu byōbu). Two more pairs of folding screens depicting landscapes of the four seasons are held by the Seikadō Bunko Art Museum. As with many Japanese and Chinese artists of this and earlier periods, many works survive that are attributed to Shūbun, but only for a few is this attribution secure. Contemporary accounts describe Shūbun as a very versatile artist, yet the only extant works with the authorship issue resolved are landscapes.

== See also ==
- Annals of the Joseon Dynasty
