= Kinsaku Nakane =

Japanese garden designer (1917–1995)

Kinsaku Nakane (1917 – 1 March 1995) was a landscape garden designer, builder, restorer, and professor. He was the president of the Nakane Garden Research Institute and president of the Osaka University of Fine Arts.

Nakane studied city planning in college and became interested landscape architecture on a vacation trip in Kyoto, Japan. There he learned about Japanese architecture and landscape architecture, professions he was not familiar with before his trip. He visited structures such as the Silver Pavilion, Ryoan-ji Temple, and the Katsura and Shugakuin detached palaces. He inspired by what he saw in Kyoto, and consequently turned down a position in the Tokyo Metropolitan City Planning Department after graduation to better understand what he saw in Kyoto.

Nakane returned to Kyoto where he lived the rest of his life. He had a son, Shiro Nakane, who also made contributions to landscape architecture. Shiro Nakane took over as president of Nakane and Associates, a garden research center and landscape consultancy that was founded by Nakane in 1966. Nakane, by the end of his career, had projects in multiple countries, not just in Kyoto, Japan.

Nakane died from a heart attack in Kyoto, Japan on 1 March 1995; he was 77 years old.

== Career ==
=== Starting in landscape architecture ===
Kinsaku Nakane began his landscape architecture career by constructing a complicated fence design in the gardens in which he worked. Once he worked his way up to having his own gardening crew working for him, he believed that there are two phases of being an apprentice in the landscape architecture industry, both lasting five years each. The first phase consisted of apprentices learning the basic skills of construction and maintenance within a garden. The second phase consisted of apprentices making their own construction decisions and being their own teachers by learning from their decisions. The apprentices had to learn the ritualized ceremony of drinking powdered tea because the orientation of the garden is crucial in the ceremonial process.

Nakane admired the aesthetic of the tea-drinking ceremony because anyone could copy the operations of the ceremony, but not everyone could replicate the aesthetic in them, much like building gardens. Nakane did not build his own garden till he was thirty-eight years old, thirteen years after he started working in Kyoto.

=== Process of designing and building a garden ===
Nakane started the process of building a garden by looking into what the client wants the garden to represent. Especially outside of Japan, where some clients want gardens to represent the climate and environment in the country in which the garden will be located, so Nakane mixed traditions, but some clients still want the Japanese style of garden, so those were easier to design and build.

Once Nakane had an idea of the style of garden, he began sketching a design in plan of what he wanted the garden to generally look like. From there he created a detailed plan which was more precise so he can begin to understand how he wanted the important things, like rock-setting, to be arranged in the garden. When all the plans are complete, materials will be ordered, and his workers will begin to get the site ready. Nakane is onsite directing his workers where to organize the important materials like the rocks and the trees. With the organization of the less important materials like moss and bushes, Nakane believed that his workers knew what he wanted, so he did not pay much attention to that side of the work. Nakane believed that if countries did not have their own style of garden, they should not just copy the Japanese style of garden; they should instead use the Japanese style as a model of how their gardens and their society should be interlinked.

=== Works of art ===
Kinsaku Nakane contributed to gardens and even gardens of his own in Japan, the United States of America, and Singapore. One of his most notable gardens outside Japan is the Tenshin-en (Garden of the Heart of Heaven) at the Museum of Fine Arts, Boston, USA, which he built in 1987. Tenshin-en is a 10,000-square-foot garden that features 178 boulders and over 1750 plants, which exemplifies symbolisms to the New England landscape. Nakane flew in a helicopter over the area to get an idea of what the landscape looked like and to start piecing together ideas for the Fine Arts Museum.

Many people know Nakane from his renovating work done to the great Ryoan-ji Temple in Kyoto, Japan. The Ryoan-ji Temple was built in the 15th century and went through many rebuilds from fires and old age. It was in 1977 when Nakane dared to change the topping of the boundary wall from clay tiles to roof shingles which to many people was controversial because he was not keeping the originality of the Temple.

Some of his other work includes his first project, the Jonangu Shinto Shrine in Kyoto. The Jonangu Shinto Shrine is a garden in a Shinto shrine where people go to pray for good health and fortune. Another notable project of his in the United States is the Japanese garden at the Jimmy Carter Library and Conference Center in Atlanta, Georgia. His garden at the Adachi Museum of Art in Singapore is another project which he completed outside of Kyoto. This garden used the Japanese style because Singapore did not have a style of garden at the time and the client, Mr. Adachi, wanted a unique garden built in a traditional style.
