= Chinsō =

Form of East Asian art

Chinsō (Japanese: 頂相 [tɕiɰ̃soː]; alternatively pronounced Chinzō [tɕindzoː]) are commemorative portraits of Zen masters, a traditional form of East Asian art, specifically Zen art. They can be painted or sculpted and usually present a Zen master ceremonially dressed and seated upright in chair. Chinsō include realistic portraits of prominent Zen monks, possibly commissioned by them and painted while they were alive or shortly after they died, as well as depictions of famous Zen patriarchs from the past commissioned by his disciples.

Chinsō were believed to have been passed down by Zen masters to their disciples as a symbol of dharma transmission, and known to have been meant for use in rituals, especially to represent the deceased during memorial services, and as an icon for their followers. Before monks would die, they would sometimes write a simple poem in the upper part of their portrait called eulogy, or have another author or monk write an inscription at the top. In Japan many remaining sculptural Buddhist chinsō are made out of wood, which may explain why so few remain in China and Korea on account of the Huichang persecution when most wooden sculptures perished. Some of the oldest surviving chinsō of Chan masters were brought from China to Japan; about 12 of those are extant.

== Background and history ==
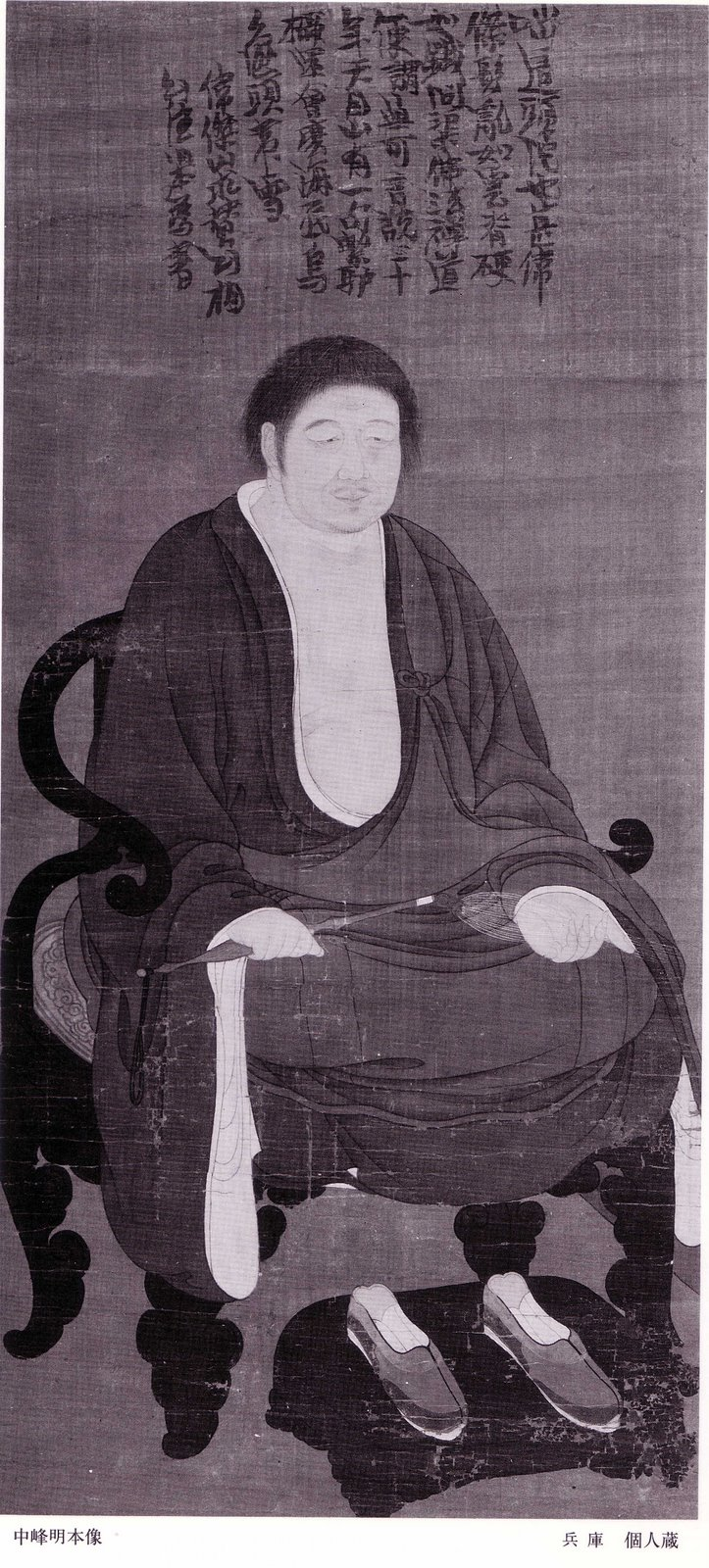
Portrait of Chinese Monk Zhongfeng Mingben

Chinsō flourished during the Song (960-1279) and Yuan (1279–1368) dynasties in China, and were introduced in Japan during the Kamakura period (1185–1333). They are considered historically significant because of their antiquity, preservation and artistic quality. There are about 70 known surviving chinsō from China and Japan from the 13th and 16th centuries that are designated “national treasures,” but about 10 times that number have survived in Japanese museums and temple collections.

=== In China ===
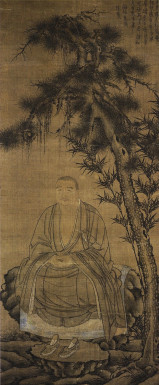
Another portrait of Monk Zhongfeng Mingben

Chinsō emerged from mainstream traditions of Chinese portraiture during the Song dynasty (960–1279). Nothing visually distinguished them from other portraits done at the time of Chinese elite; the formal qualities were all the same. Chinsō are mainly understood to follow this basic formula: the monk is seated cross-legged in a chair, feet hidden, with his shoes on a footstool in front of him, in a three-quarter view, and ceremonially dressed with inner and outer robes and a kasaya or surplice draped over his left shoulder. The surplice can be held together with an ornamental ring right over the monk's heart. He usually holds something in his right hand, like a whisk, scepter, staff or bamboo. They follow the highest standard for painting at the time. As well as following the same basic formula of Chinese portraiture, chinsō assumed the characteristics of Chinese portraiture in general. These included private ownership, verse inscriptions, their role in social networks. Surviving chinsō also include many works created in Japan once Zen Buddhism was brought there from China.

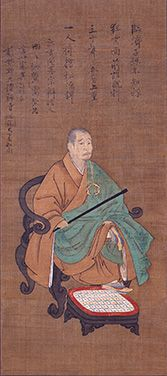
Portrait of Japanese Monk Ikkyū Sōjun (1394–1481)

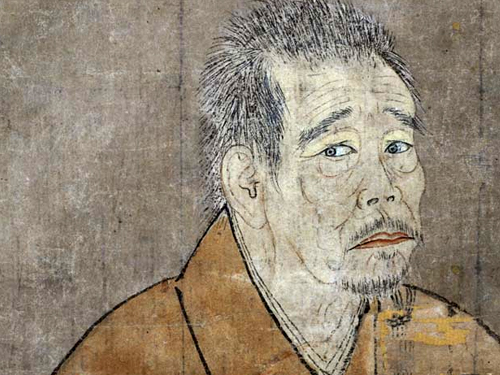
Another portrait of Ikkyū Sōjun

=== In Japan ===
When Zen Buddhism was brought to Japan from China, the Chinese style of portraiture as well as these traditions surrounding chinsō, were brought with them. This realistic style was not typical in Japan and set chinsō apart from other portraits at the time in Japan because of their high degree of verisimilitude. Although most easily identifiable chinsō have the subject seated in a chair, in three-quarter profile against a black background, with an inscription at the top, not all chinsō followed this rigid formula. The portraits of Japanese monks Mokuan Shuyu and Ikkyu Sojun represent this identifiable formula, but the alternative version of Ikkyu Sojun does not. Instead of being seated in three-quarter view, the monk or patriarch could be shown frontally, or as a full figure, and could be in a circular frame instead of simply as a figure against a blank background. Less common are chinsō showing a monk in meditation in a landscape setting, where he could be either walking or sitting. Chinsō are usually inscribed at the top with a eulogy written in free verse, describing who the patriarch was, why it was made and possibly who wrote the eulogy and why. Some scholars distinguish chinsō from the soshizō 祖師像 category, which includes portraits of legendary patriarchs from the distant past, by checking whether or not the portrait is inscribed. It's also important to note that the soshizō were not as realistic as the chinsō.

== Etymology ==
Chinsō, or dingxiang in Chinese, is a Chinese Buddhist neologism, and was originally a translation for the Sanskrit term uṣṇīṣa. The usnisa is the term coined for the fleshy protuberance on top of the Buddha's head. In India it was said to be invisible because it is unable to be seen by living beings. During the Song dynasty in China, the term chinsō began being used for portraits of Zen monks as we know the term today. The existence of a protuberance on top of a Buddha's head represented the fact he had reached enlightenment, similar to how chinsō were thought to prove enlightenment when passed down from a monk to his disciple.

== Functions ==
Chinsō have been known to serve many purposes throughout their history. The category includes portraits commissioned by the Zen monks themselves and painted while they are alive or shortly after they had died, and portraits commissioned by famous Zen patriarchs’ disciples to be used for worship. Scholars have also concluded that they could have been used as certificates or proof of dharma transmission. By proof of dharma transmission, it is meant that the portraits were thought to have been passed down from Zen master to their disciples when they became enlightened, since dharma transmission is the recognition of the enlightenment in a monk's successor and the passing down of lineage. This theory has since been questioned by scholars. Since the category of chinsō is so broad and includes portraits used for worship as well as portraits used to represent dharma transmission, the category could use stricter guidelines for classifying portrait as chinsō. The true function of chinsō is under question by scholars for the purpose of clarifying the category.

More recently (since about 1994) it has come to the attention of scholars that chinsō were used in a mortuary context, rather than used to certify or authenticate dharma transmission. This was particularly the case in China. They were used after monks had died, meaning that they were used like other icons are: as a receptacle for a deity in a ritual context, like objects of worship in temples. An article by T. Griffith Foulk and Robert Sharf published in 1994 attempted to demystify this part of Zen culture by clarifying that chinsō did not serve as evidence of dharma transmission but are simply a category of Buddhist portraiture used in a mortuary context. Their inscriptions provide possible legitimization to lineage of transmission and possible affiliation, but are said to not have been given for the sole purpose of certifying enlightenment. This argument is supported by their claims that chinsō, unlike more important items for representing transmission like a monk's robes, were passed out freely in China to “laymen, novices, merchants, and the like”. Their argument goes on to say chinsō could have just been part of the regular gift-giving tradition. Different recipients of chinsō include designated dharma heirs associated with specific lineages, another meaningful relation to the monk, who received the portrait as a gift or an anonymous person who received the portrait at a fundraiser (a “hauzshu” in Chinese). The purpose and usage of chinsō is still in question by scholars.

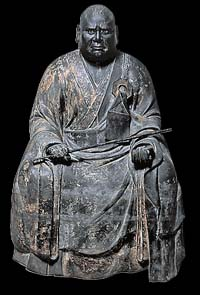
Statue of Monk Chikotsu Dai'e

Some dharma lineages have been heavily influenced by portraiture. For example, the Portrait of Chikotsu Dai’e established Chikotsu Dai’e 癡兀大慧 (1229–1312) as a disciple of the Chan monk Enni Ben’e 円爾弁円(1202–1280) because the inscription of the chinsō is similar to that of Enni Ben’en's on his own portrait, and Enni's is similar to that of his predecessor Wuzun Shifan 無準師範 (1178–1249), a Chinese Chan monk. The portrait of Wuzun Shih-fan was brought by his disciple Enni Ben’en to Japan in 1241 and is one of the oldest surviving chinsō. Chikotsu Dai’e's portrait thus establishes the genealogical sequence of Wuzun Shih-fan to Enni and then to Chikotsu. Though it is unclear if chinsō served as certificates of dharma transmission, throughout history they have been used to show a direct line of dharma transmission and lineage. The portraits of these three monks show a clear acknowledgment of enlightenment from one monk to his disciple, from Wuzun Shih-fan to Enni Ben’en to Chikotsu Dai’e. Although each monk may not have passed down their chinsō to his disciple as proof of transmission, we can understand the history of lineage as being shown through the passing down of the portraits.
