= Otsu-e =

Japanese folk art

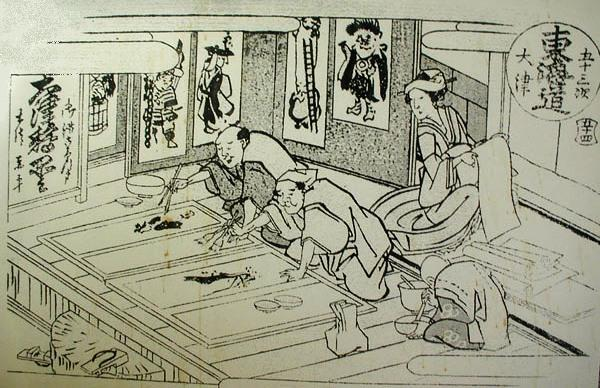
A Japanese family collaborating in producing Ōtsu-e

Ōtsu-e (大津絵, "pictures from Ōtsu") was a folk art that began in 17th century Japan and depended on the busy road traffic of the trade route through the district where it was produced in Ōtsu, near Kyoto. With the coming of railways, especially of the Tōkaidō line in the late 19th century, it largely disappeared.

== Context ==
In the early 17th century, Ōtsu, a port on Lake Biwa just east of the imperial capital of Kyoto, lay at a famous cross-roads for trading routes and particularly the important highway to the administrative capital of Edo, where the newly-installed government of the Tokugawa resided. Here and in the villages near it, there developed a tradition of rudimentary folk art that catered to passers-by. The trade is dated to around 1624/44 and depended on the busy traffic passing through Oiwake, near Ōtsu-juku, the last post station on the Tōkaidō and Nakasendō roads before travellers from Edo reached Kyoto, where the pictures were sold from roadside stalls.

The origins of the art remain unclear: some historians credit its invention to a painter named Matabei (not to be confused with the better-known Iwasa Matabei), active in the village of Ōtsu, from which the style is thought to take its name.It was quickly and cheaply produced, often with whole families collaborating on the work of producing the pictures. Religious and popular themes were originally brushed onto a light clay wash over rough, brownish paper. The pictures were then displayed for sale on roadside stalls and were intended to be attached to doorways or pasted on pillars and sliding doors in the home. Among the techniques used to speed their production was the use of compasses to produce haloes on holy figures and a woodblock to provide the rough outline of a head that was then painted over.

The trade seems to have begun sometime in the first half of the 17th century. Buddhist subjects with a protective religious purpose were commonest at first, to which were added themes from folklore which eventually came to prevail. During the 18th century, illustrations were given a moral didactic purpose and explanatory text was introduced about the picture. Often, though, there was a satirical bite: demons were portrayed as monks on alms round, or as taking a bath with a comment inscribed such as "Many wash the body but not the mind". After the foot trade dwindled with the emergence of rail travel, the style lingered on among a few locally and is even having a present-day revival.

== Reception ==
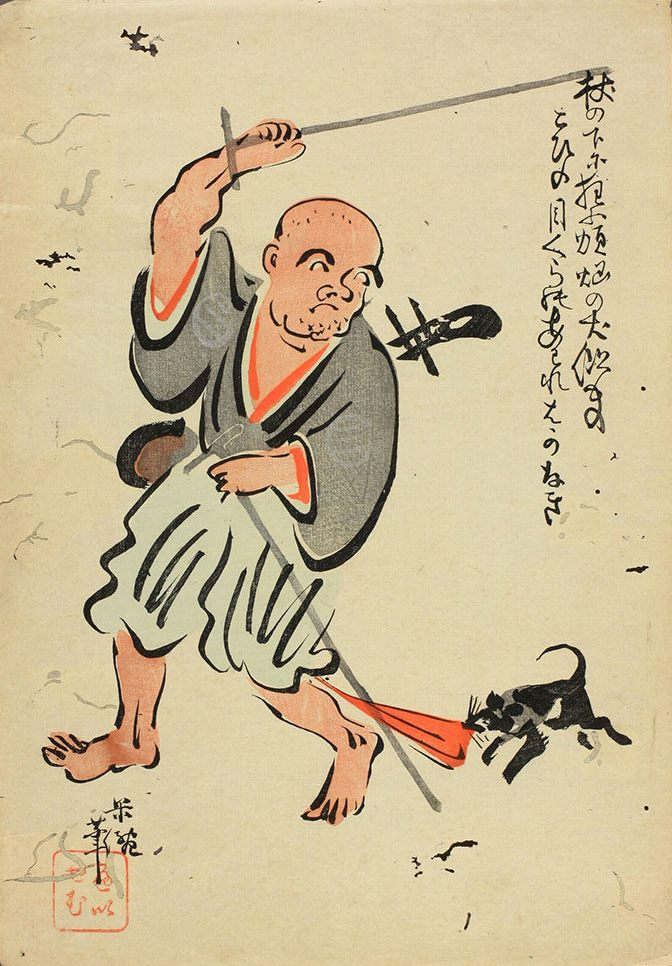
A blind musician fending off a dog with his crutch

From the start, the style was produced by and aimed at commoners. It was dismissed by the sophisticated with cheerful insults, as in Yosa Buson's haiku "Skywards a swallow / darts and targets with droppings / the Ōtsu-e below". Only Matsuo Bashō, with his respectful appreciation of community culture, treated it more sympathetically: "How did it begin, / the brush in Ōtsu paintings, / with what Buddha's name?"

Some have claimed Ōtsu-e as an ancestor of the ukiyo-e woodblock prints that replaced them nationally, but such printing techniques were not employed there until the 19th century, well after the ukiyo-e style had become popular. However, several artists in the Utagawa school incorporated Ōtsu-e elements into their prints. This is evident, for example, in Utagawa Kuniyoshi's composite triptych titled Ōtsu-e Paintings Coming Alive; or in the popular figures incorporated into Utagawa Hiroshige's The Bon-odori dance.

One image from this source was particularly popular for its ambivalent meaning. It pictured a blind musician who fends off a dog that is worrying at his trailing clothes. Its original humorously moral purpose was "intended as a warning against being caught unawares, the loose sash representing a 'loose' or unfocused mind. However, around the mid 19th century, the image may have been read as a satire on the declining power of the Tokugawa shogunate, with the blind man representing the government being caught unawares by aggressive foreign powers, symbolized by the dog." Utagawa Toyokuni I made the theme his own in a print of two blind men striking at dogs that bark at their heels. Kuniyoshi went further in the series he created under the name Hodomoyoshi, each of which incorporated an Ōtsu-e image in one corner, accompanying his own more dynamic imitation of the scene depicted there. The theme of the blind man attacked by a dog is reinterpreted as the warrior Shimizu Kwanja Yoshitaka raising his sword at a giant rat that is gnawing the end of the scroll he carries. In this way Kuniyoshi makes an appeal to the popular tradition of mass production at a time that his own more elegant version was replacing it.

== See also ==
- Ukiyo-e
- Tosa and Kano schools
