= Autumn and Winter Landscapes =

National Treasure Landscape by Sesshu

Autumn and Winter Landscape
- Shihon Bokuga Shūtō Sansuizu, 紙本墨画秋冬山水図 (Japanese)
- Artist: Sesshū Tōyō
- Year: 1470s
- Dimensions: 47.7 cm × 29 cm × 30.2 cm (18 in × 11.5 in × 11.9 in)
- Designation: National Treasure
- Location: Tokyo National Museum, Ueno, Tokyo
- Accession: A-1398

Autumn and Winter Landscapes (Japanese: 紙本墨画秋冬山水図, Romaji: Shihon Bokuga Shūtō Sansuizu) is a Japanese ink painting created by Sesshū Tōyō, a Zen monk and prominent landscape painter during the Muromachi period. Currently held at the Tokyo National Museum, it is considered a masterpiece of Chinese-style landscape painting, and was designated National Treasure on 31 March 1953.

== Description ==
In 1468, at the age of 48, Sesshū embarked on a trip to Ming China to study contemporary modes and styles of landscape paintings. Though initially studying under the auspices of Tenshō Shūbun and Josetsu, the expedition and visits to vast regions and cities from Beijing and Ningbo helped expanded and developed the styles that would be utilized in Autumn and Winter Landscapes.

As a Zen monk, Sesshū's expeditions involved observation and contemplation of nature, and thus, the paintings were designed to provoke ambiance of the seasonal landscapes. He modelled his painting style based upon the works of Xia Gui, with the use of splattered ink (hatsuboku).

=== Autumn Landscape ===
The Autumn Landscape depicts a river flowing up the scroll with a tall building in the distance. The space in the top portion of the painting accentuates the subtle mountain background and the autumn sky. On the bottom left, two people are engaged in conversation at the bottom, and the upper half of the painting has an infinite expanse.

In a feature about the piece Yomiuri Shimbun, by Cultural Affairs Agency specialist Minoru Watada, the Autumn Landscape could have been "Summer Landscape" or a "Spring Landscape", the latter of which, claims that the depiction of an ume tree is a motif characteristic of the Spring season.

=== Winter Landscape ===
Winter Landscape contrasts with the infinite expanse of Autumn Landscape with its depiction of a cliffside in winter, and a solitary figure climbing towards a distant building. The jagged vertical line at the center conveys the texture of the cliff and its size as well as dimension with respect to the field of vision, as well as providing a recession into the background space. Trees in the background are barren to evoke the sense of winter.

The use of greyscale in the painting, provides dimension to the winter landscape and the snow, with the whites conveying the snow, and the greys to accentuate texture, shadow, and slush from the snow melt. The background also blurred as to convey falling snow.

== Exhibition History ==
A regular fixture of the Tokyo National Museum, it was first acquired in 1936, transferred from Manshu-in, a Tendai monastery in Sakyō-ku, Kyoto. In 1939, the paintings, along with many designated National Treasures were displayed abroad at the Staatliche Museen zu Berlin, in the Ausstellung Altjapanischer Kunst exhibit of 1939 as a result of Germany–Japan relations with the Anti-Comintern Pact. In 1953, its designation as National Treasure makes it among Sesshū's six works to receive that designation. It received additional conservation work in 1976 with the paintings receiving a new mounting and box.

The works are exhibited in regular rotations as part of the Tokyo National Museum's Permanent Collection, in addition to travelling in retrospectives on Sesshū and masterpieces of Japanese art.

== See also ==
- Landscape by Sesshū
