= Haboku =

Japanese ink based painting techniques

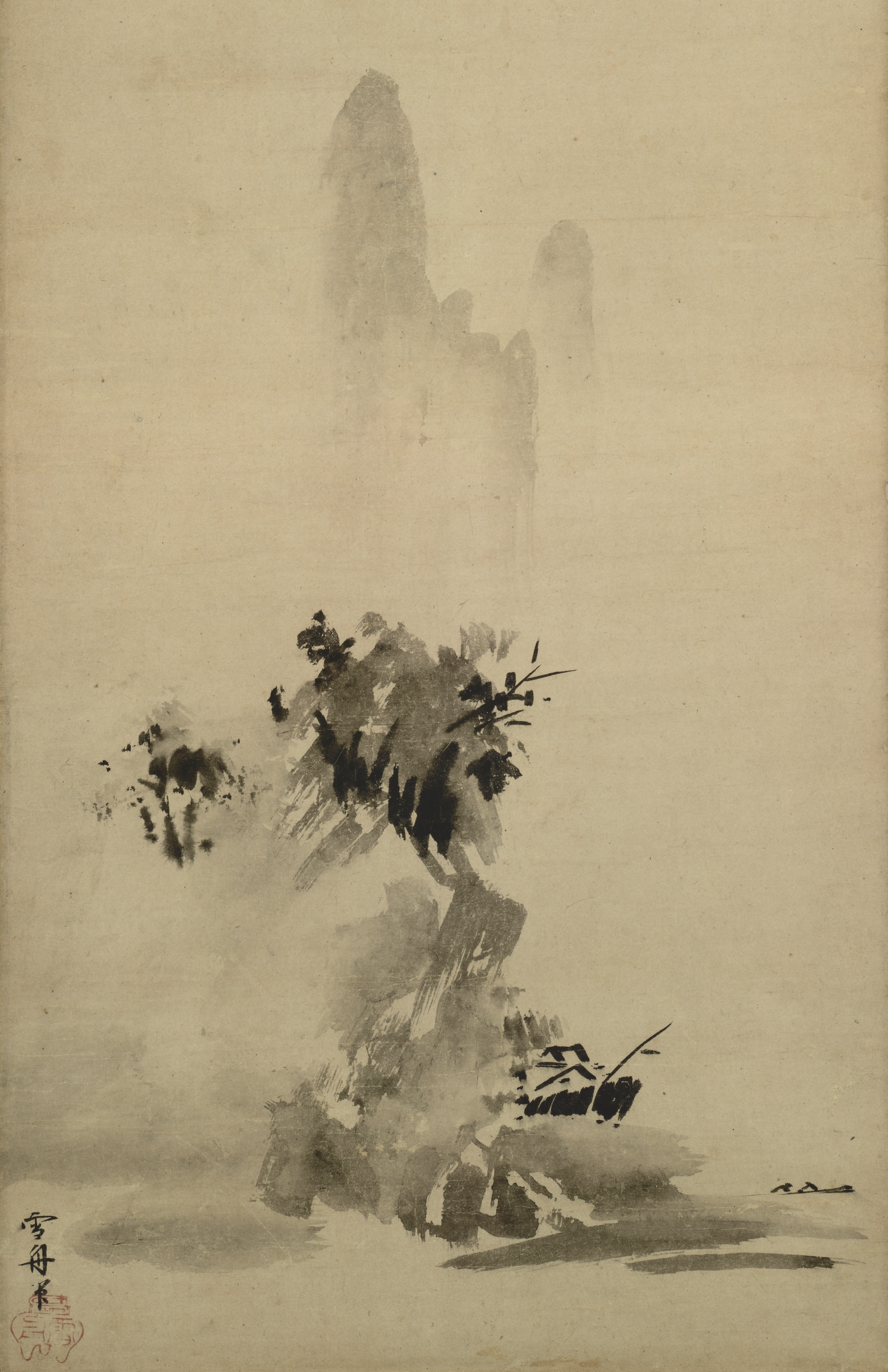
Splashed-ink Landscape (破墨山水, Haboku sansui) by Sesshū Tōyō, 1495

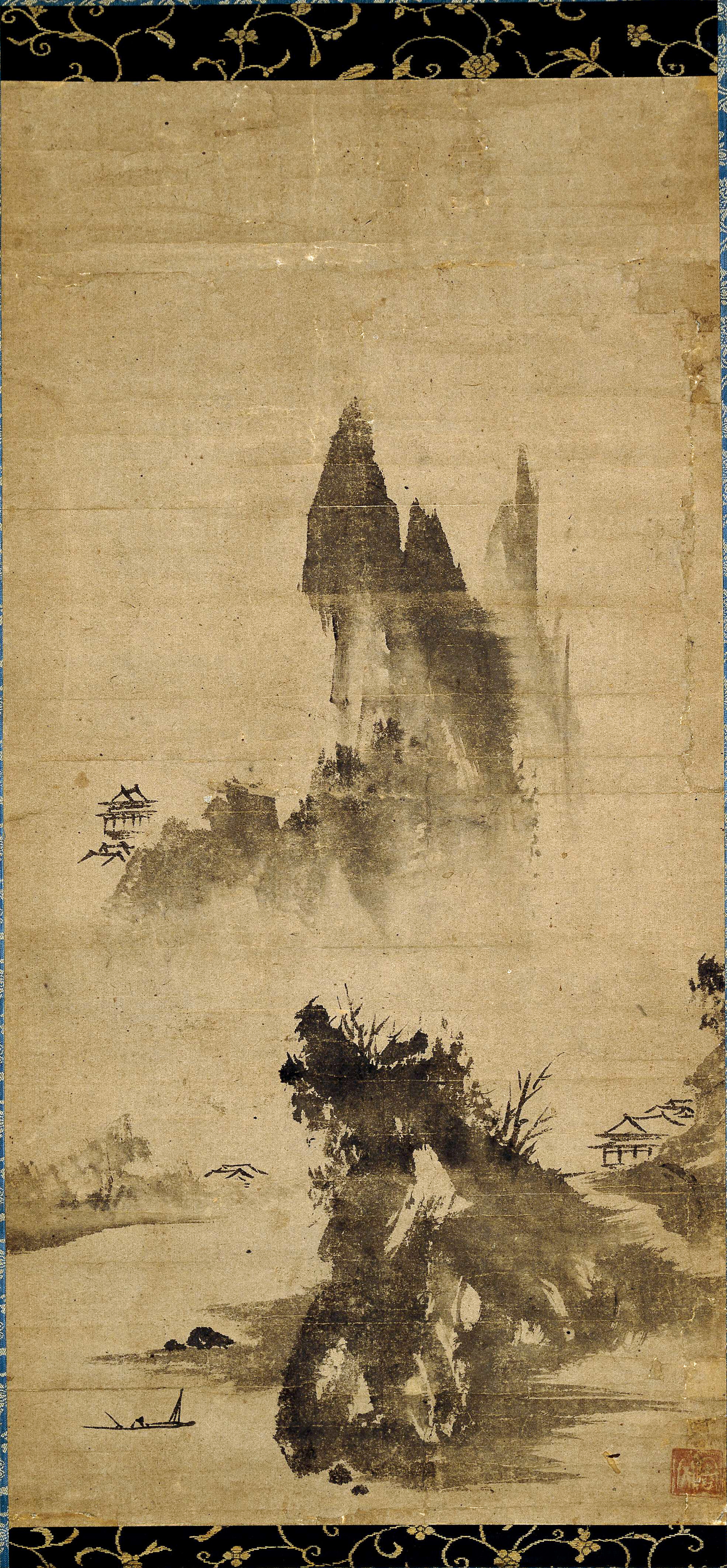
Sesshu's landscape in hatsuboku style

Haboku (破墨) and Hatsuboku (溌墨) are both painting techniques employed in suiboku (ink-wash painting) in China and Japan, as seen in landscape paintings, involving an abstract simplification of forms and freedom of brushwork. The two terms are often confused with each other in ordinary use. Generally, haboku relies on a layered contrast black, gray and white, whereas hatsuboku utilizes "splashes" of ink, without leaving clear contours or outlines. The style apparently started in the Tang dynasty China with the painter Wang Qia (王洽, fl. 785–805, also known as Wang Mo), but none of his paintings remains. According to Zhu Jingxuan:

Whenever he wanted to paint a picture, Wang Mo would first drink wine, and when he was sufficiently drunk, would splash the ink onto the painting surface. Then, laughing and singing all the while, he would stamp on it with his feet and smear it with his hands, besides swashing and sweeping it with the brush. The ink would be thin in some places, rich in others; he would follow the shapes which brush and ink had produced, making these into mountains, rocks, clouds and mists, wash in wind and rain, with the suddenness of Creation. It was exactly like the cunning of a deity; when one examined the painting after it was finished he could see no traces of the puddles of ink.

During the Song dynasty, some landscapes of Mu Qi's paintings on the Xiao and Xiang rivers exhibit many of its characteristics, and were highly praised in Japan. It was with Yu Jian (玉澗) in China when we have the first paintings in the style, for example Evening Market. In Japan, these styles of painting were spread by the Japanese painter Sesshū Tōyō. Later, the Kano school of painting also made many paintings in this style.

== Japanese Origin ==
A Japanese zen monk, Sesshū Tōyō, traveled to china in 1468-1469 to study contemporary Ming painting and through his studies he created the Haboku style. He returned to western Japan specifically Masuda (present day Shimane Prefecture) or Yamaguchi Prefecture in Suō province where he set up Tenkaitoga-ro studio and enjoyed the patronage of the Mori family.
