= Landscape by Sesshū =

Painting by Sesshū Tōyō

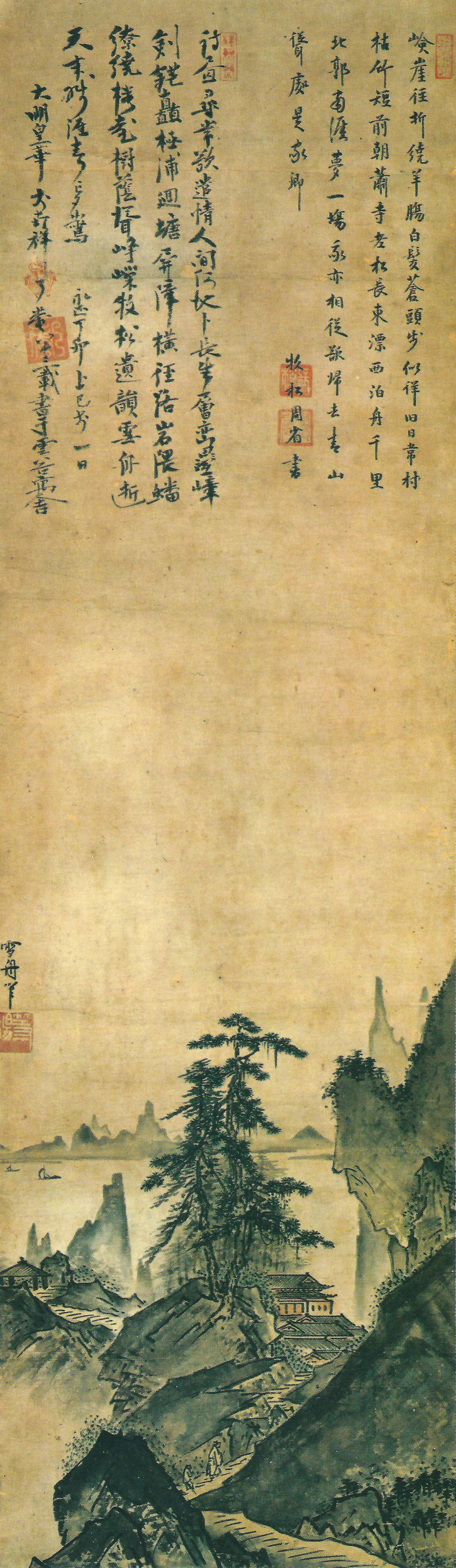
Landscape by Sesshū (NT), private collection; ink and light colour on paper; 118.0 centimetres (46.5 in) by 35.5 centimetres (14.0 in)

Landscape by Sesshū is one of the most securely authenticated works of the Japanese Muromachi period artist Sesshū (1420–1506). It is an ink wash landscape (山水図) in the private collection of the Ōhara family in Kurashiki, Okayama Prefecture, Japan. The hanging scroll has been designated a National Treasure.

== Painting ==
Executed in the shin (真) or carefully delineated (as opposed to sō (草) or hatsuboku 'splashed ink') style, the landscape is thought to be one of the artist's final works. The vertical accent of two pine trees takes the place of a central mountain peak, while the distant shore has a "modern" horizon line unusual for the period. The zigzag path leading to a pavilion on a lookout point contributes to the painting's considerable "spatial depth". Journeying along the path are an old wanderer accompanied by a young attendant, recurrent figures in Sesshū's landscapes. The contrast between the dilute ink of the sea and sky and the more concentrated rocks and vegetation, and the expressive use of the background tone of the paper, helps give the painting its "impression of extreme intensity". Touches of colour include green wash over the pine needles and of orange in the buildings; ink added to the pale yellow wash on the path almost gives the effect of shadows cast by the rocks.

== Inscriptions ==
To the left are Sesshū's signature and seal, while above are two poetic inscriptions or gasan (画賛), by friends of the painter. The one on the right is by Bokushō Shūshō (牧松周省), a Zen priest with connections, like Sesshū, with the Ōuchi clan. That on the left by Ryōan Keigo is dated 1507, the year after the painter's death.

嶮崖径折繞羊腸 Mountain precipice, the winding path twists along,
白髪蒼頭歩似徉 a grey-haired man, his servant wandering on foot,
旧日韋村枯竹短 from distant times tanned-leather village, withered bamboo stumps,
前朝簫寺老松長 close at hand flute temple, towering old pines,
東漂西泊舟千里 to the east afloat, west at anchor, boats to journey a thousand li,
北郭南涯夢一場 northern districts, southern shores united in a dream.
我亦相従欲帰去 I too would follow on this journey,
青山聳処是家郷 where blue mountains rise up, my family village.
牧松周省書 by Bokushō Shūshō

詩画尋常欲遣情 Poetry and painting inspire pleasant feelings,
人間何地卜長生 but where do men live for long?
層巒畳嶂剣鋩矗 In the mountain range peaks jut out like daggers,
極浦廻塘屏障横 far away a curving bay separated off,
径路岩隈蟠繚繞 a narrow path winds between rocks,
楼台樹蔭聳崢嶸 towers and trees soar up high.
牧松遣韻雪舟逝 Bokushō has left his poem, Sesshū too has passed away,
天末残涯春夢驚 their loss disturbs the landscape and my dreams.
永正丁印上巳前一日 Eishō 4, third month, second day
大明皇華前南褝 了庵八十三載書于雲谷寓舎 by Ryōan, imperial envoy to the Ming, formerly of Nanzen-ji, aged 83, at the Unkoku-an

== History ==
The landscape was known in the seventeenth century, when it was copied by Kanō Tan'yū. Subsequently disappearing from the record, it turned up in a "curio dealer's shop" in Kyoto in 1906. Sold for ten thousand yen, it was later acquired by Magosaburō Ōhara for the sum of 160,000 yen. It remains today in the private collection of the Ōhara Family.

== See also ==
- List of National Treasures of Japan (paintings)
- Ohara Museum of Art
