= Haboku sansui =

1495 painting by the Japanese artist Sesshū Tōyō

The full hanging scroll of Broken Ink Landscape by Sesshū Tōyō, 1495, including dedicatory inscription by the artist, and six poems by Zen Buddhist monks.

Haboku sansui (破墨山水図, haboku sansui-zu; Broken Ink Landscape) is a splashed-ink landscape painting on a hanging scroll. It was made by the Japanese artist Sesshū Tōyō in 1495, in the Muromachi period. The ink wash painting is classified as a National Treasure of Japan and currently held by the Tokyo National Museum.

== Overview ==
Sesshū Tōyō (雪舟等楊) was a Zen Buddhist monk and painter. The work is a development of suibokuga (水墨画) paintings made with Chinese ink (墨, sumi), using dark and light shades on a silk or paper medium. The monochromatic style can result in artworks similar to calligraphy. In spite of its title, the work is not one of "broken ink" (破墨, haboku) but rather one of "splashed ink" (溌墨, hatsuboku). In this style, the painter avoids strongly defined outlines, with shapes indicated by colour washes in lighter and darker tones.

The work slowly reveals itself to the viewer. Emerging from the undefined forms is the suggestion of misty mountains in the background. In the foreground are cliffs and bushes, and the triangular roofline and a sloping banner for a wine shop with vertical lines forming a fence. Below is indicated the flat surface of a body of water, with two people to the right in a rowing boat.

The scroll measures 148.6 by 32.7 centimetres (58.5 in × 12.9 in). It bears a dedicatory inscription by the artist, dating it to the middle of the third month in the fourth year of the Meiō era (that is, April or May 1495), when Sesshū was aged 76. It was presented to Sesshū's pupil Josui Sōen, at his request, as a physical demonstration that he had studied under Sesshū in Suō Province (now in Yamaguchi Prefecture). As an indication of the artistic heritage passed on to his pupil, Sesshū wrote on the scroll that he had travelled to China where he said he had studied the works of Li Zai and Zhang Yousheng, and had studied in Japan with Tensho Shubun, who was a pupil of Taikō Josetsu. It is unlikely that he actually met Li Zai, however, as the latter died a considerable time before Sesshū's visit to China.

On his journey home to Engaku-ji in Kamakura, Josui Sōen stopped in Kyoto, where he asked six Zen Buddhist monks from Gozan temples to add poems to the scroll. A similar work by Sesshū is currently held by the Cleveland Museum of Art, and another is preserved at the Idemitsu Museum of Arts in Tokyo.

== Gallery ==
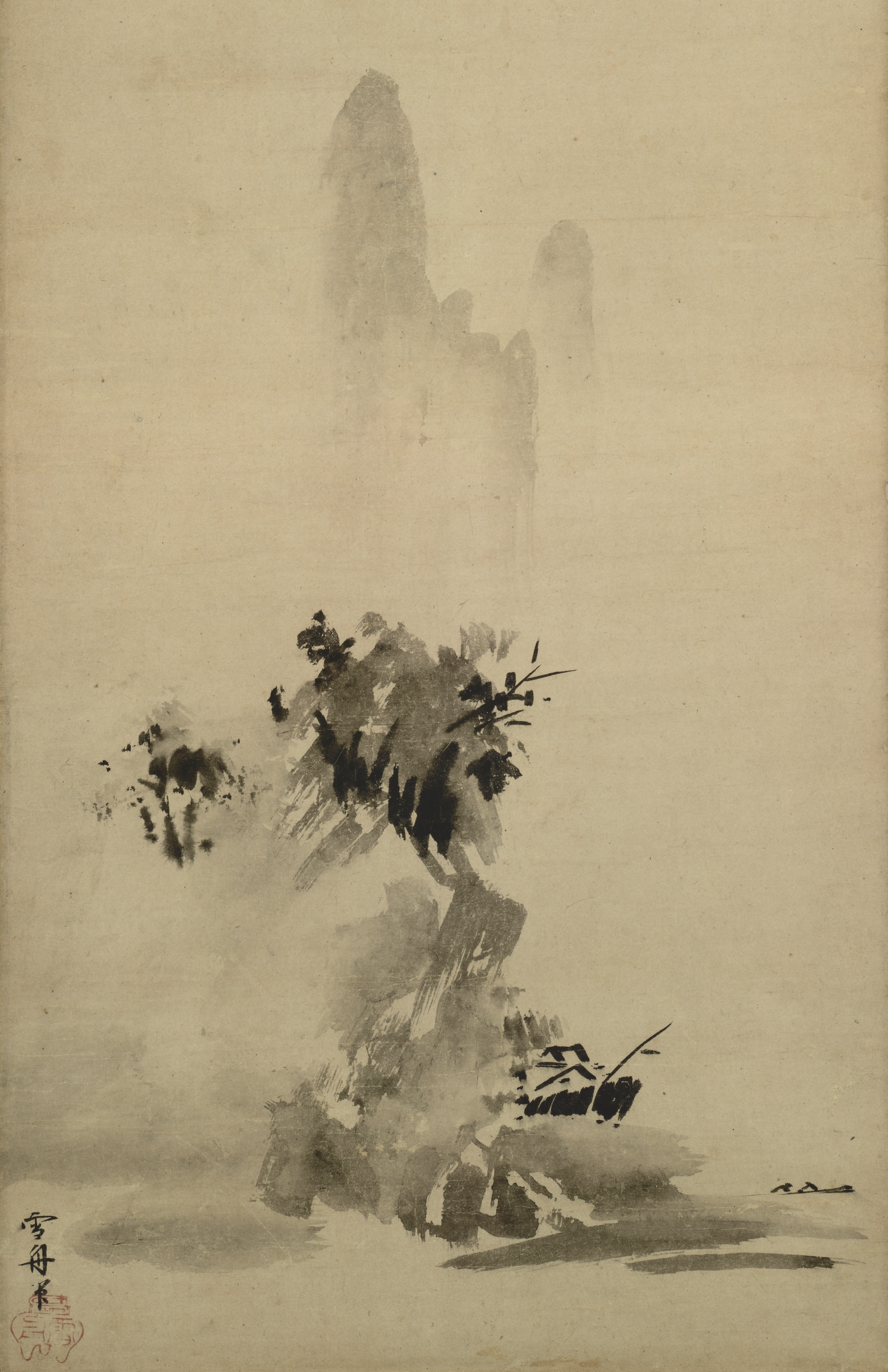
Main image

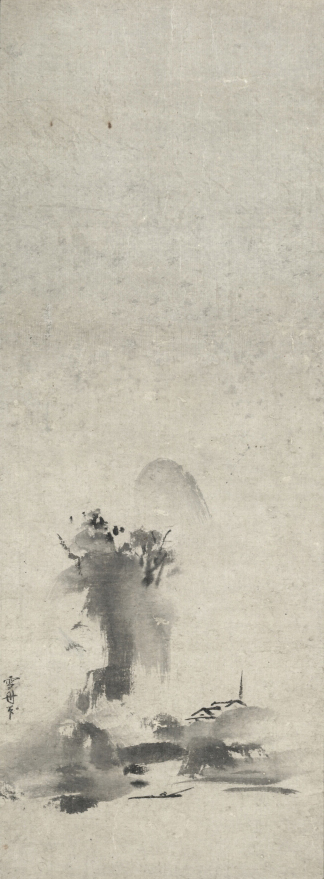
Cleveland

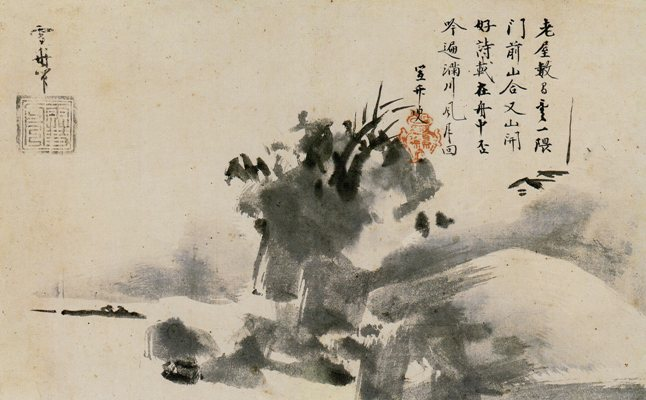
Idemitsu

== See also ==
- List of National Treasures of Japan (paintings)
