= Sesshū Tōyō =

Japanese painter (c. 1420–1506)

Sesshū
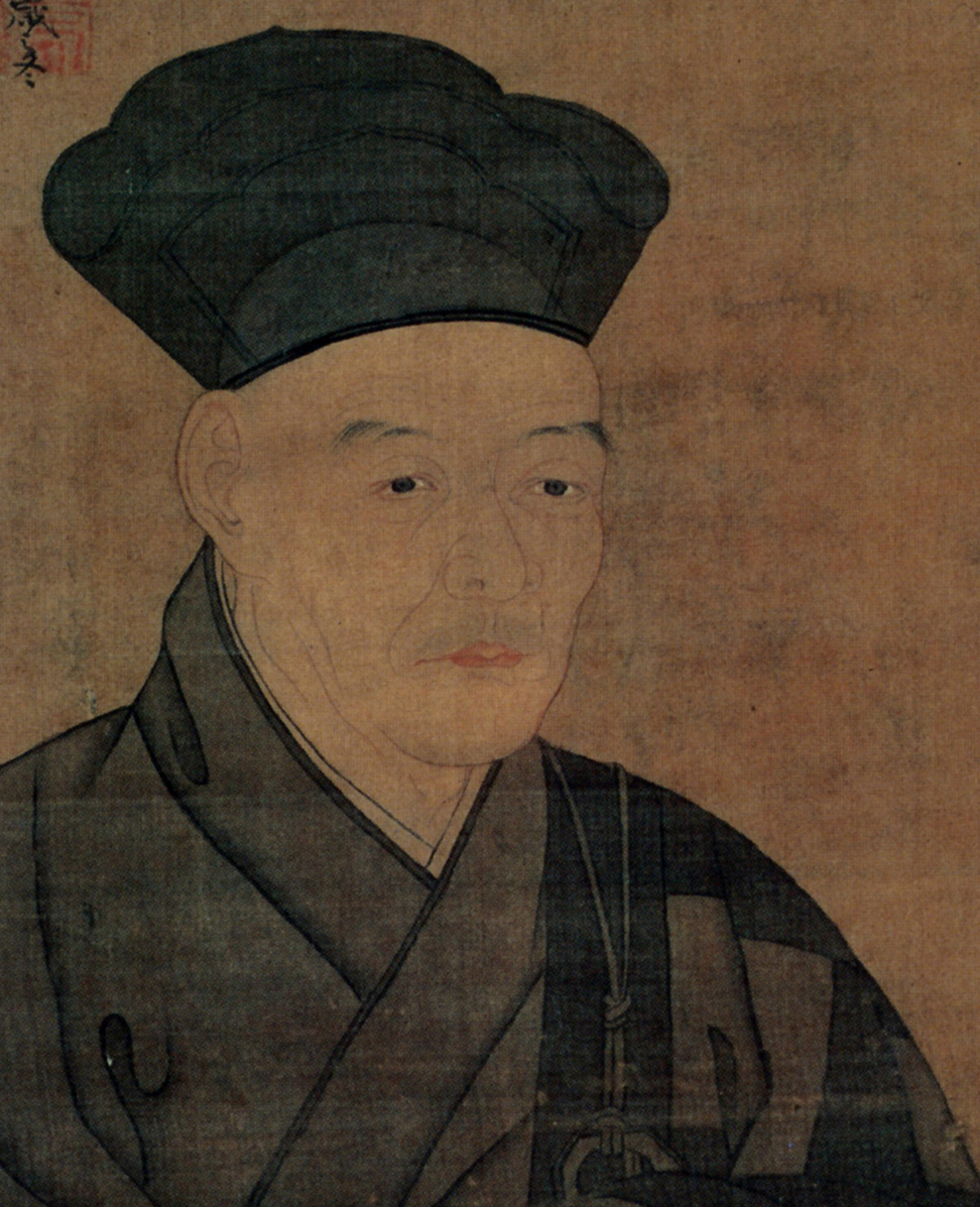
- A 16th century copy of Sesshū's 1491 self-portrait
- Title: Suibokuga master; Zen Master

Personal life
- Born: c. 1420 Bitchū, Ashikaga shogunate
- Died: 26 August 1506 (aged 85–86)
- Notable work: Landscape by Sesshū

Religious life
- Religion: Buddhism
- School: Rinzai

Senior posting
- Teacher: Tenshō Shūbun

Sesshū Tōyō (雪舟 等楊; c. 1420 – August 26, 1506), also known simply as Sesshū (雪舟; Japanese pronunciation: [seꜜɕ.ɕɯː]), was a Japanese Zen monk and painter who is considered a great master of Japanese ink painting. Initially inspired by Chinese landscapes, Sesshū's work holds a distinctively Japanese style that reflects Zen Buddhist aesthetics. His prominent work captured images of landscapes, portraits, birds and flowers paintings, infused with Zen Buddhist beliefs, flattened perspective, and emphatic lines.

Sesshū was born into the samurai Oda family (小田家) and trained at Shōkoku-ji temple in Kyoto, Japan, as a Zen monk. From his early childhood, Sesshū showed a talent for painting and eventually became widely revered throughout Japan as a wise, reputable Zen scholar, and the greatest painter priest of Zen-Shu.

Sesshū worked in a painting atelier whilst training under Tenshō Shūbun (c. 1418–1463). But upon visiting China, his work took on a distinctive Chinese influence, merging Japanese and Chinese styles to develop his individualistic style of Zen paintings. Sesshū's influence on painting was so wide that many schools of art appointed him their founder. Sesshū's most acclaimed works are Winter Landscape (c. 1470s), Birds and Flowers (1420–1506) and Four Landscape Scrolls of the Seasons (1420–1506).

== Biography ==
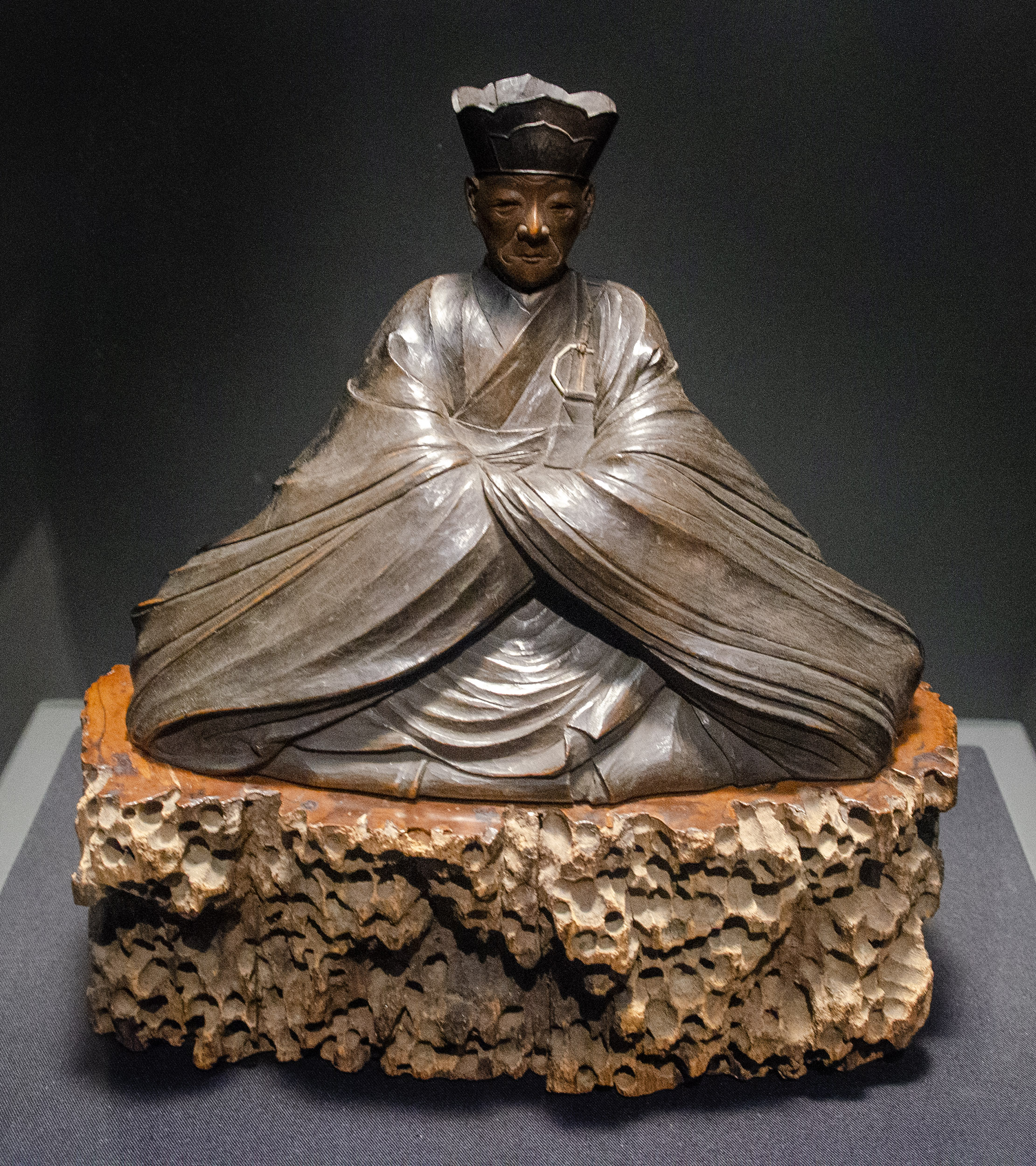
Sculpture of Sesshū, by Miwa Zaiei. Edo period, 1787

=== Early life ===
Sesshū Tōyō was born in Akahama (now Sōja City), a settlement in Bitchū Province, which is now a part of the Okayama Prefecture, during the Muromachi period. As a child, Sesshū entered the Buddhist community at the Hofukuji temple in Okayama, Japan. Little is known about Sesshū's early life, but there is a well-known tale that, whilst at Hofukuji Temple, Sesshū's instructor was forced to discipline him by tying him to a temple post. After a few hours passed, Sesshū used his tears as ink to draw a mouse on the wooden floor. The mouse was so realistic that it sprung to life and gnawed at the tight ropes to set him free.

At the age of twelve or thirteen years old, Sesshū entered the Shōkoku-ji temple in Kyoto, Japan, as an acolyte under the head priest of all zen temples, Shunrin Shuto, and eventually became a zen monk. Shōkoku-ji temple held a close relationship with the Muromachi government as the temple's main supporters were a part of the ruling Ashikaga family. Whilst at Shōkoku-ji temple, Sesshū was a pupil of Tenshō Shūbun, who was often regarded as Japan's first great master of ink landscape painting. Sesshū worked under Shūbun for 20 years before leaving Kyoto for a small provincial zen temple in western Japan. Here, he was left free from monastic and political duties to focus on painting.

=== China ===
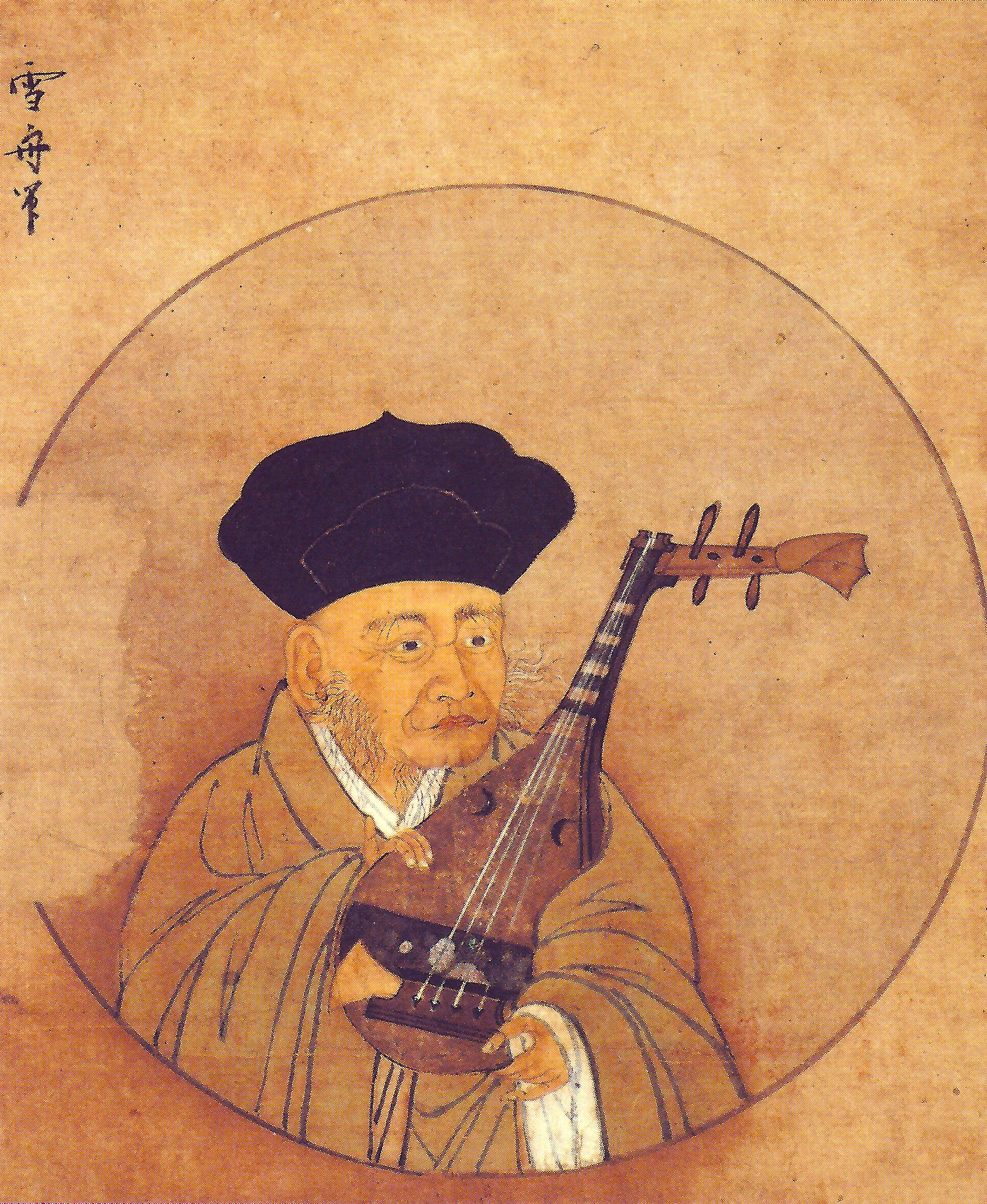
Self-portrait by Sesshū

Funded by a wealthy warrior clan that engaged in trade with China, then ruled by the Ming Dynasty, Sesshū travelled to China in 1467 as a member of a Japanese envoy. He travelled to China for three years, exploring the Chan monasteries, landscapes, and studied professional artists' Chinese paintings, rather than those by literati masters. Here, Sesshū had the opportunity to study traditional Chinese master paintings, learning about their realistic styles. During his travels from Ningbo to Peking, Sesshū felt the vastness of nature, learning from the original references used in Chinese ink painting. This influenced his following work greatly since, before visiting China, Sesshū worked under Shūbun's style. Following Sesshū's three years in China, his familiarity with Chinese landscapes showed in succeeding works as they held a distinct Chinese influence with his developing individualistic style.

=== Return to Japan and death ===
In the last years of Sesshū's life, he visited Masuda, Japan, to study zen whilst painting and creating spiritual gardens called Sesshū's gardens. In 1506, at 87 years old, Sesshū died at Tokoji temple, but his remains were taken to Ikoji temple, subsequently known as Sesshū temple, where they were cremated. Following Sesshū's death, his pupil, Shutoku, inherited his studio, Unkoku-an.

== Paintings and techniques ==
Sesshū's works are predominantly suibokuga, meaning "water and ink paintings". For suibokuga artists, the exclusivity of black ink allowed them to focus on the essential character of the subject since Zen Buddhism stresses material simplicity and sensitivity to the natural world. To create his monochrome paintings in diluted greys and black ink, Sesshū used black sumi, meaning charcoal or soot-based solid ink on paper or silk, thus following the art of sumi-e Some of Sesshū's most acclaimed works include Winter Landscape (c. 1470s), Four Landscape Scrolls of the Seasons (c. 1420 – 1506) and, Birds and Flowers (c. 1420 – 1506), demonstrating his style of flattened space, emphatic outlines, and angular brushstrokes to portray zen beliefs.

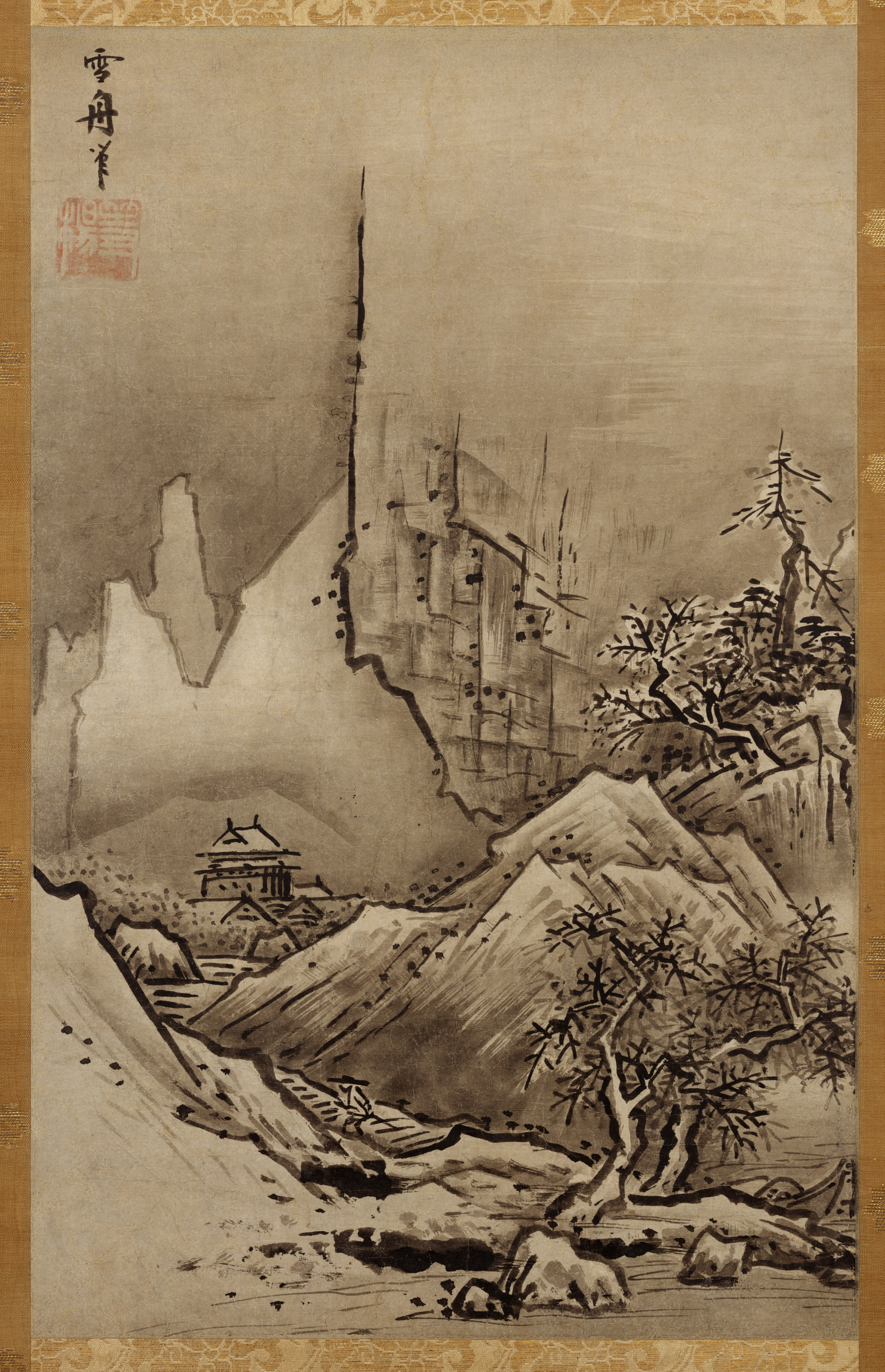
Winter Landscape (c. 1470s), Collection of the Tokyo National Museum.

=== Winter Landscape (c. 1470s) ===
Following his sojourn in China, Sesshū painted Winter Landscape (c. 1470s) in Japan's rural provinces, demonstrating how Sesshū combined his artistic techniques and zen concepts. Sesshū solely used black sumi ink diluted to shades of grey. Flat, overlapping mountains depict the snowy landscape. Through short, expressive brushstrokes, Sesshū depicts a male figure trekking up a steeped pathway to a barren temple complex, suggesting the arduousness of his journey during the peak of winter. Common to Sesshū's paintings, the single figure is surrounded by a towering landscape that draws on the concept of mono no aware, humankind being present with nature, to create a secluding atmosphere. Throughout the composition, Sesshū uses the shumpo technique, varying the firmness and thickness of outlines to depict three-dimensionality and textures. This modelling is enhanced by the diluted ink washes and rendering using fine lines. In the foreground, the rocks and trees show weighted, dark lines whilst the left distant mountains are outlined against the grey sky with a single brushstroke to capture the moment. The intensity of Sesshū’s work is shown by the sharp, angular brushstrokes in the centre, reflecting Zen Buddhism's influence. Similarly, he uses ink wash for the rolling mist to divide the space between solid and void, mirroring the Taoist metaphysical concept of tension between subjects. This is heightened by the sharp diagonals of the opposing foreground rocks as they bring a sense of inescapable, pent up energy. The background features a single, strong, lightning-like brushstroke that outlines the central cliffs as the tip vanishes into the mist, suggesting transitory moments in time, as believed in Zen Buddhism. Overall, Winter Landscape represents Sesshū's stylistic choices and implementation of Zen Buddhist concepts, notably drawing on Chinese landscapes that symbolised a virtuous man’s dedication to remaining honourable during strenuous moments.

=== Four Landscape Scrolls of the Seasons (c. 1420–1506) ===
Painted at 67 years old, Sesshū Tōyō's Four Landscape Scrolls of the Seasons (c. 1420–1506) depicts the flow of the four seasons whilst reflecting on his experiences with Japanese and Chinese landscapes. Each scroll is composed of two silk strips as the paintings were originally screen panels, but were later arranged on a single kakemono. Despite depicting the seasons sequentially as Spring-Summer-Autumn-Winter, the Autumn scroll is distinctively different. From Sesshū's travels, Autumn holds a dominating Chinese stylistic influence. For example, Sesshū's use of the Chinese technique progressive vision, where using several viewpoints creates an image more accurate to one's experience with nature, suggesting a synthesis of time and space. Sesshū's treatment of pine needles aligns with the method of sung-yeh-tien whilst the dotted leaves mirror ku-chiao-tien (black-pepper-dots), which were techniques shared by Chinese artists before Sesshū. Within this painting, Sesshū reduces proportions as the space recedes whilst placing distant objects higher in the composition. This is heightened through atmospheric perspective where Sesshū ambiguously manipulates the line quality and texture for recession. Overall, Four Landscape Scrolls of the Seasons demonstrates Chinese influences on Sesshū's work and his use of space and composition to represent the soul of nature in the landscapes.

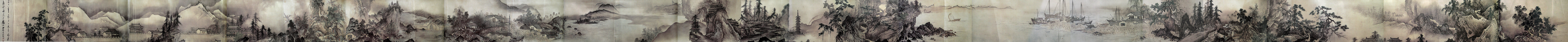
Landscapes of the Four Seasons

=== Birds and Flowers (c. 1420–1506) ===
The influences of Sesshū's studies in China are reflected in two famous hanging scrolls of seasonal landscape paintings of birds and flowers, painted in ink and colour on silk, in the Perry Collection. Sesshū paints assertive rock contours and textures using a wet brush with splitting hairs. This brings a scratchy, rough texture to give the rocks a sense of solidity and tangibility. Such technique can be seen in the Four Landscape Scrolls of the Seasons Autumn and Winter landscapes. As a recurring motif in Sesshū's landscapes, the rock is trapezoidal with two indentations on top. Like in Winter Landscape, Sesshū uses a zigzag, or lighting shape to contribute to the composition's structure. Within this composition, Sesshū flattens space using spatial ambiguities and variations in scale. Sesshū's contrast in scale creates an illusion similar to the Zen notion of zero time and space, where there are no distinctions between past, present or future. Compositionally, there is no distinction between the whole image and the subjects that make it. Sesshū purposefully controls tonal intensities to suggest atmospheric perspective through subtle ink gradations for the mist to evoke poetic autumnal feelings.

View of Amanohashidate (1501–1506)

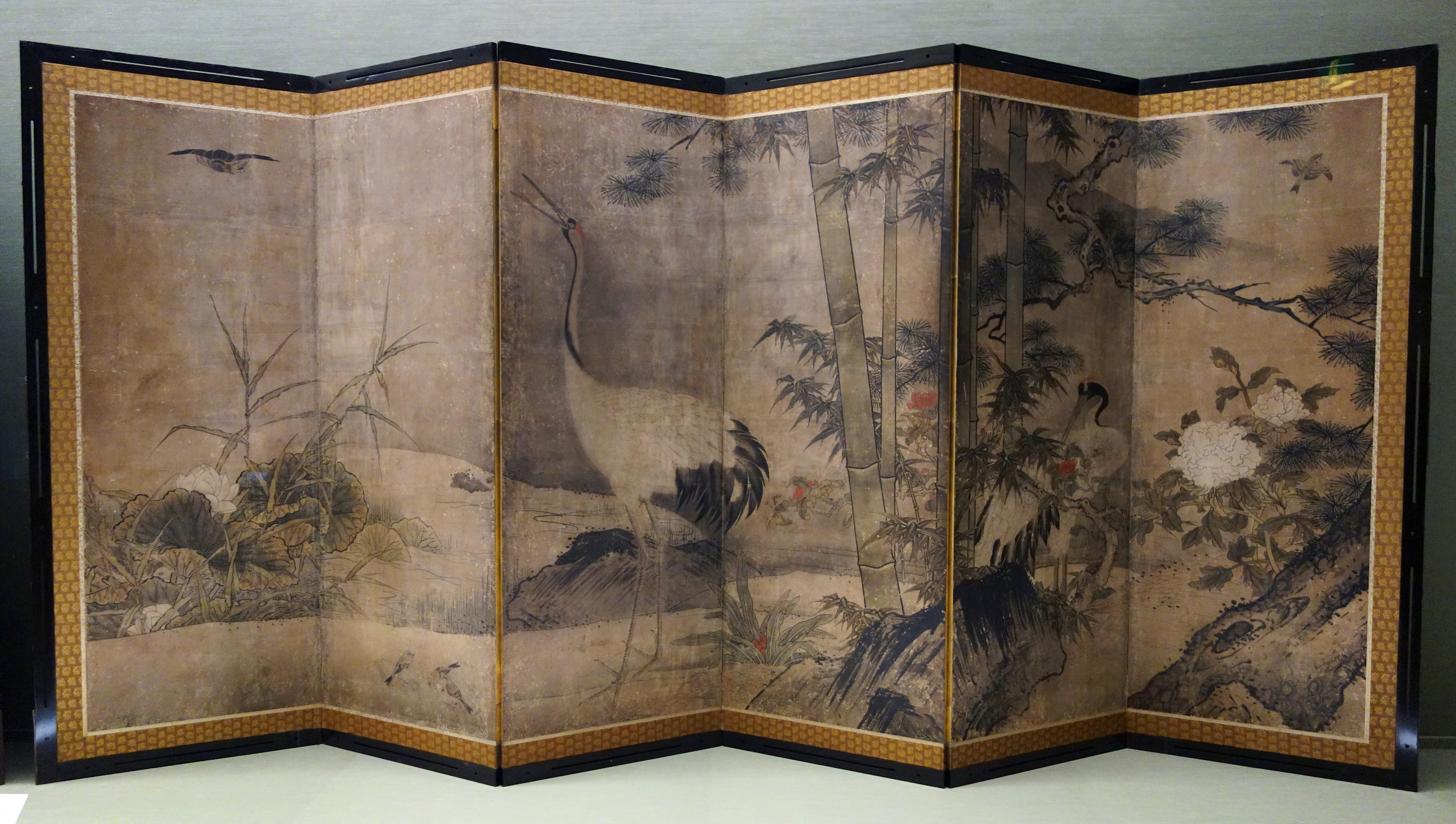
Flowers and Birds of the Four Seasons, second panel of a byōbu

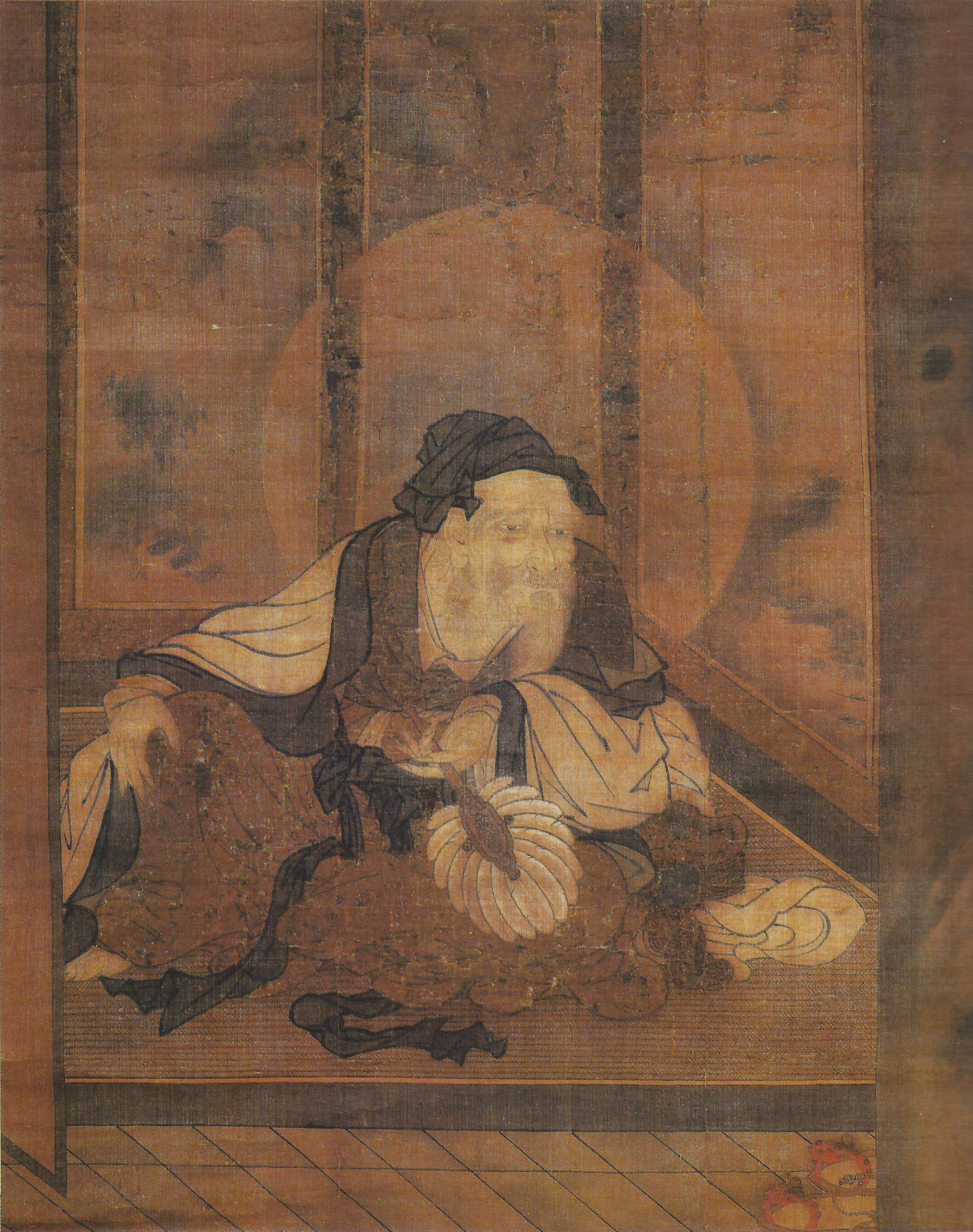
Vimalakirti

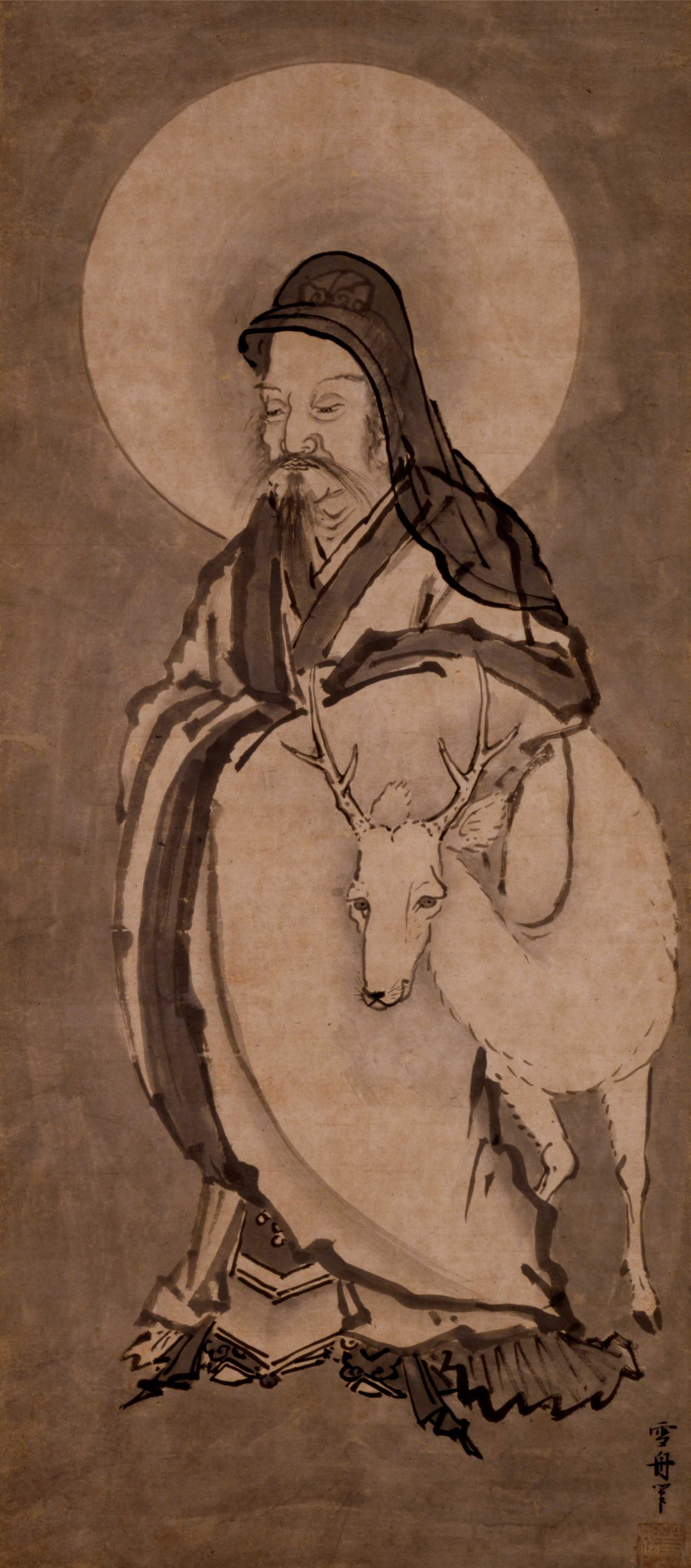
Jurōjin

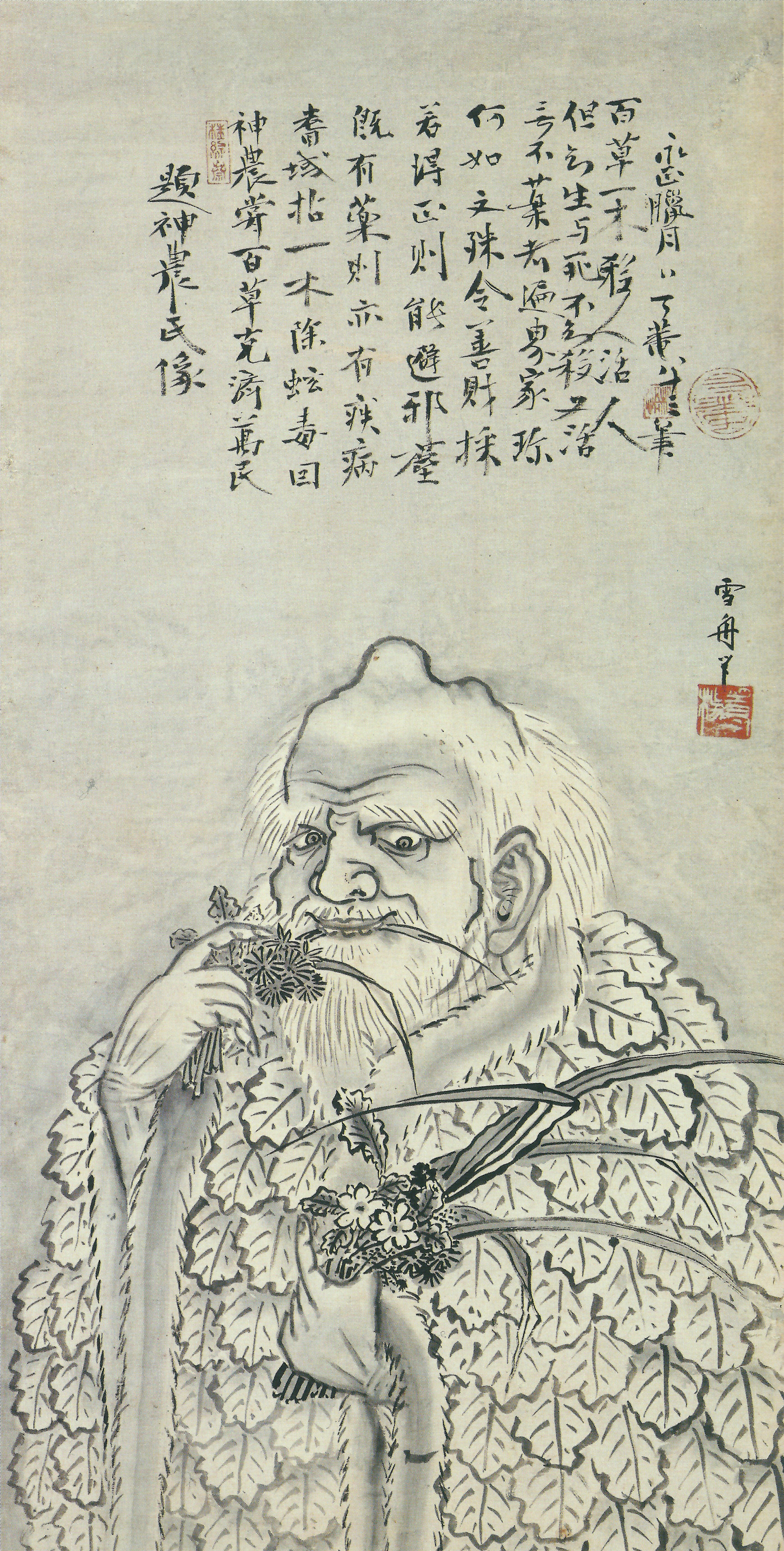
Shennong

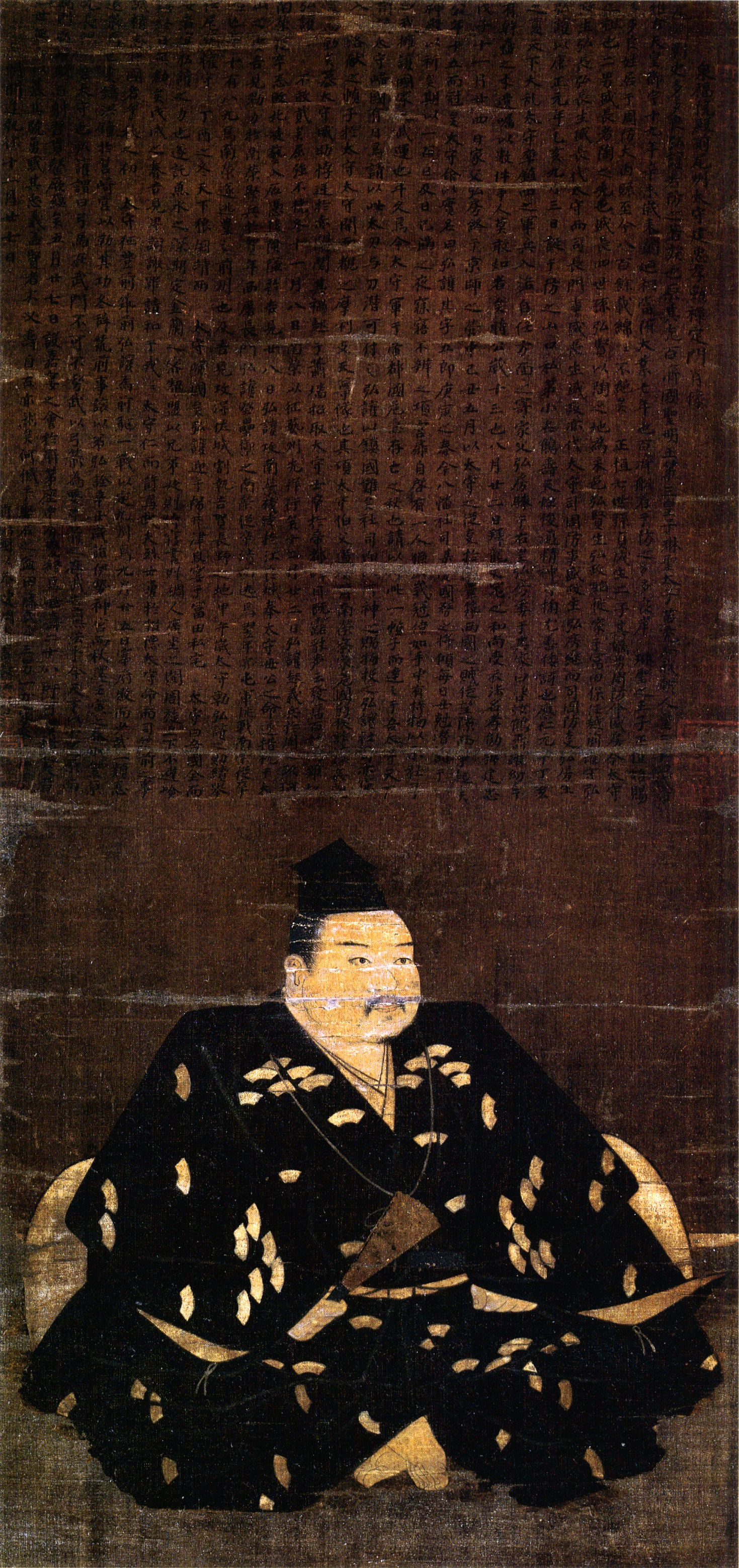
Portrait of Sue Hiromori (1484)

Huike Offers His Arm to Bodhidharma (1496)

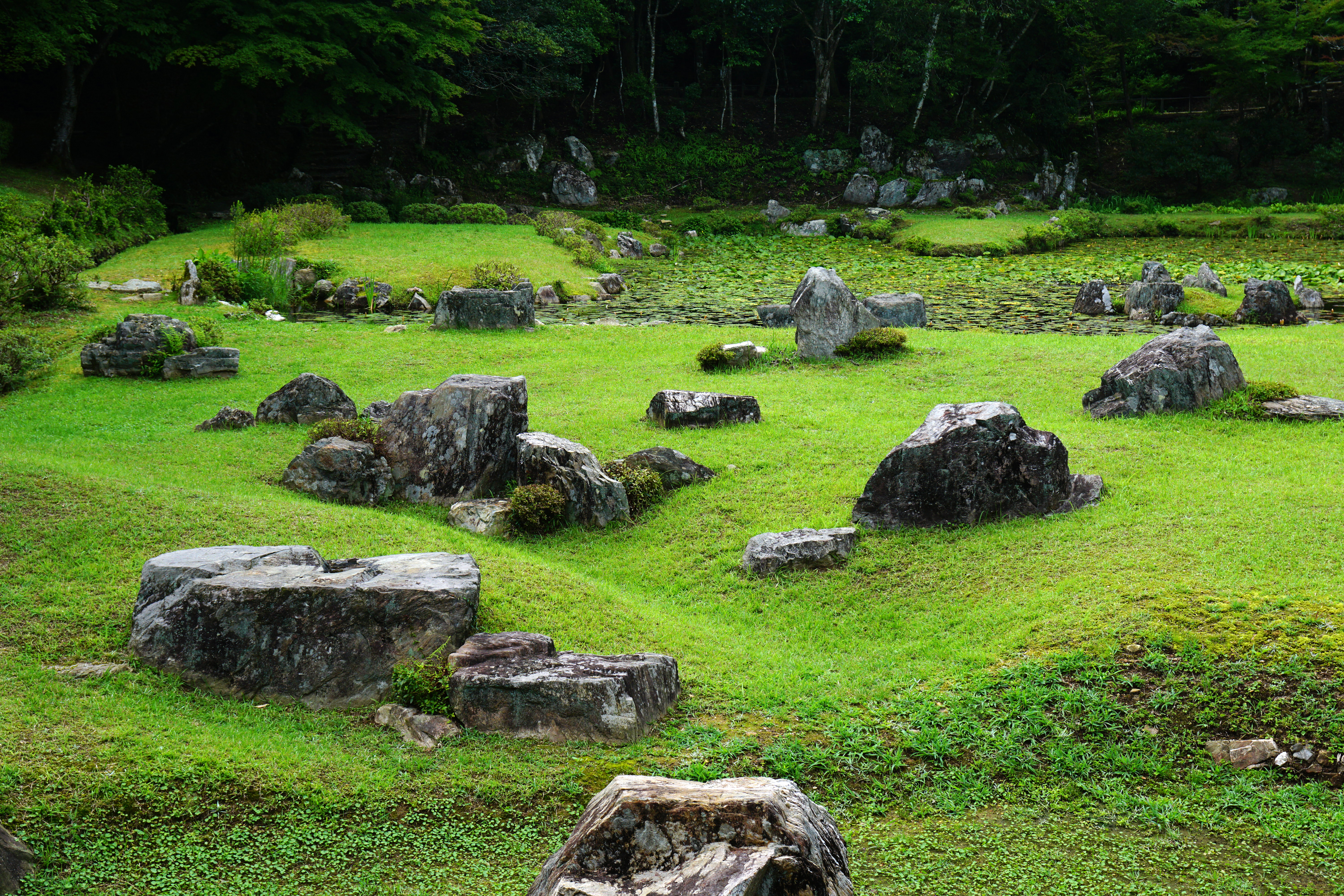
Jōei-ji Temple Gardens, design attributed to Sesshū

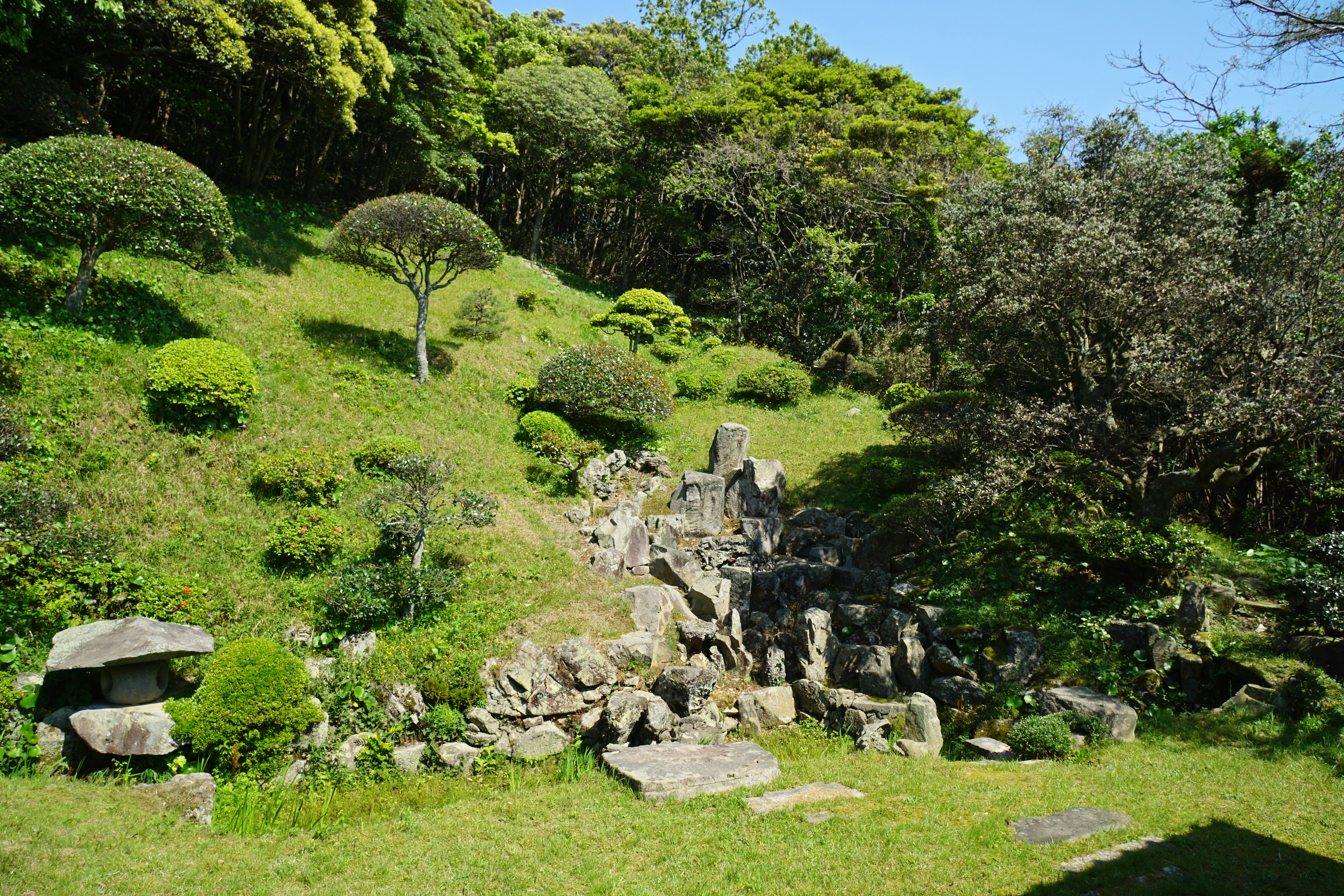
Ogawa Family Gardens, Shimane

== Legacy ==
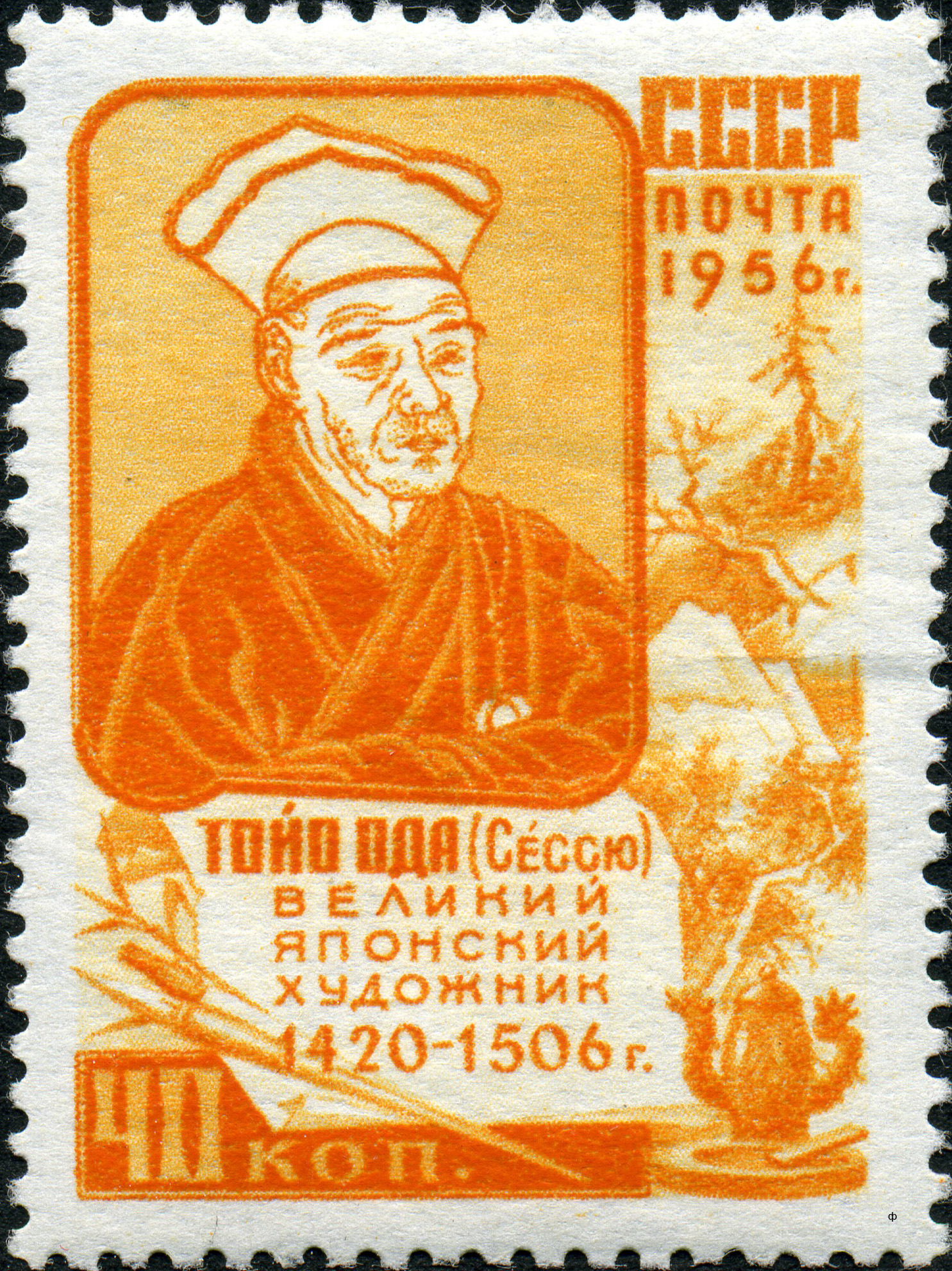
Sesshū depicted on a 1952 USSR stamp

Sesshū's emphasis on Zen Buddhism, personal interpretation and economical expression in painting was the basis of his legacy for succeeding Japanese artists. Subsequently, his rendering techniques were widely used by sixteenth-century artists, notably those who attended Sesshū's painting schools.

The canonization of Sesshū in Japanese modern art history began "in late nineteenth to early twentieth centuries". This included an incorporation into a new dynamic or system with participation of government officials, academics, and collectors.

== List of selected works ==
=== Landscapes ===
- Four Landscape Scrolls of the Seasons (c. 1420–1506)
- Winter Landscapes from Landscapes of the Four Seasons (c. 1420–1506); Tokyo National Museum)
- Autumn and Winter Landscapes (c. 1470s; Tokyo National Museum)
- Short Scroll of Landscapes (c. 1474–1490; Kyoto National Museum)
- Long Scroll of Landscapes (Sansui Chokan) (c. 1486; Mori Collection, Yamaguchi, Japan)
- Haboku Sansui, "splashed-ink" technique scroll (1495; Tokyo National Museum)
- View of Ama-no-Hashidate (c. 1502–1505; Kyoto National Museum)
- Landscape by Sesshū
- Chinese Landscape with rocky mountains (circa 1440-1460); British Museum

=== Other ===
- Portrait of Masuda Kanetaka (1479; Masuda Collection, Tokyo)
- Huike Offering His Arm to Bodhidharma (Daruma and Hui K'o) (1496; Sainen-ji, Aichi, Japan)
- Flowers and Birds, pair of sixfold screens (undated; Kosaka Collection, Tokyo)

== See also ==
- Tenshō Shūbun, similar Muromachi era painter
- Suibokuga, painting style adopted by Sesshū
- Hasegawa Tōhaku
- Buddhism in Japan
- Taoism
- List of Rinzai Buddhists
