= Buddhism in Japan =

- Flag

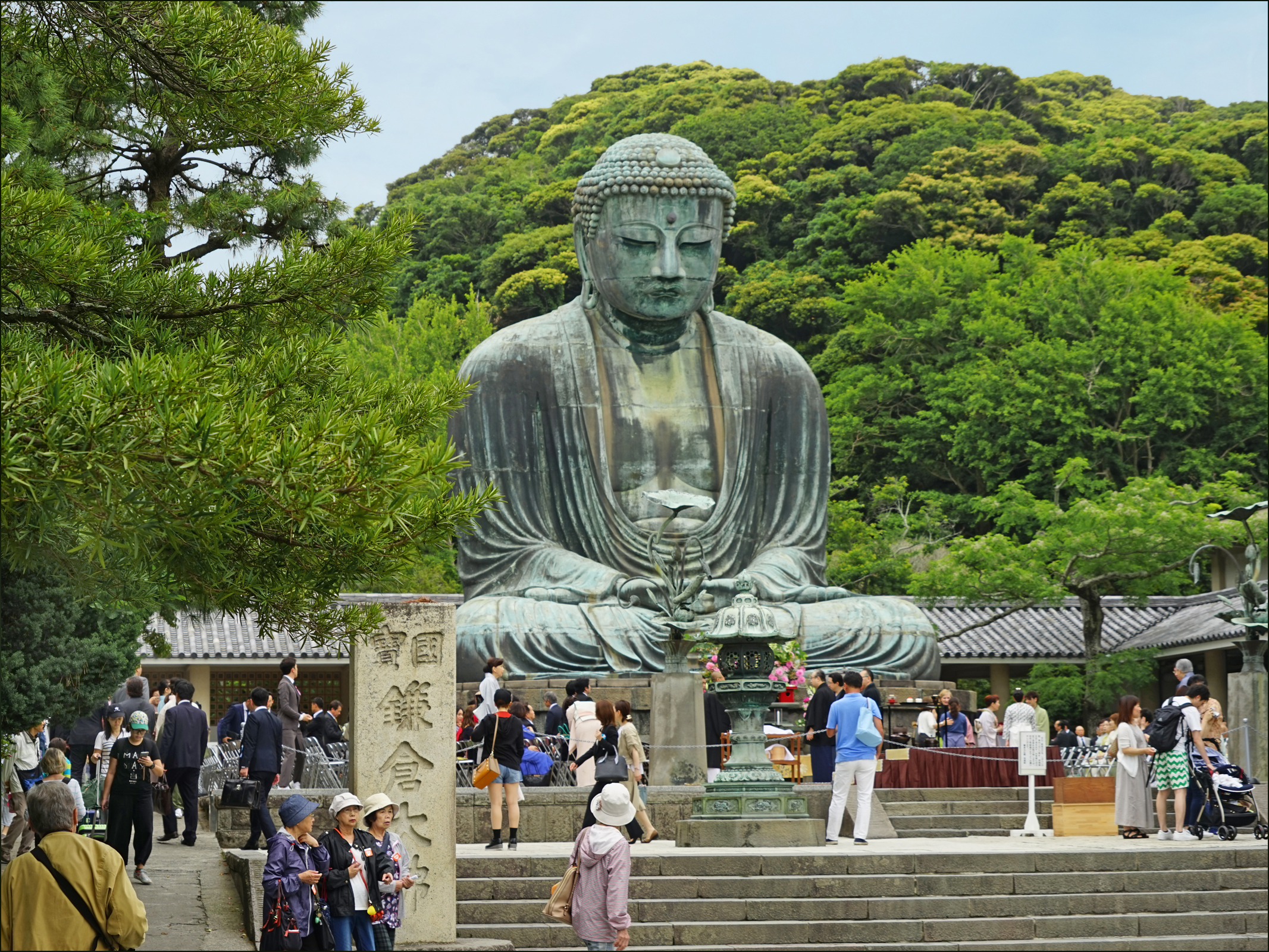
- The Great Buddha (Amida) (Daibutsu) at Kōtoku-in, Kamakura, in Kanagawa Prefecture, Japan (National Treasure)

Total population
- Estimates vary, from c. 46 million or 46% (Pew Research est., 2023) to under 20% (JGSS Research Center, 2017).

Regions with significant populations
- Throughout Japan

Religions
- Buddhism (mostly East Asian Buddhism)

Languages
- Japanese and other languages

Buddhism was first established in Japan in the 6th century CE. Most of the Japanese Buddhists belong to new schools of Buddhism which were established in the Kamakura period (1185－1333). During the Edo period (1603–1868), Buddhism was controlled by the feudal Shogunate. The Meiji period (1868–1912) saw a strong response against Buddhism, with persecution and a forced separation between Buddhism and Shinto (Shinbutsu bunri).

The largest sects of Japanese Buddhism are Pure Land Buddhism with 22 million believers, followed by Nichiren Buddhism with 10 million believers, Shingon Buddhism with 5.4 million, Zen Buddhism with 5.3 million, Tendai Buddhism with 2.8 million, and only about 700,000 for the six old schools established in the Nara period (710－794).

== History ==
=== Early Buddhism (5th-13th century) ===
==== Arrival and initial spread of Buddhism ====
Originating in India, Buddhism arrived in Japan by first making its way to China and Korea through the Silk Road and then traveling by sea to the Japanese archipelago. Though often overlooked in Western academia, Buddhism was transmitted through trade routes across South East Asia in addition to the Sinosphere. As such, early Japanese Buddhism is strongly influenced by Chinese Buddhism and Korean Buddhism, which were influenced by Indian Mahayana Buddhism. Though most scholars date the introduction of Buddhism to the middle of the sixth century, Deal and Ruppert note that immigrants from the Korean Peninsula, as well as merchants and sailors who frequented the mainland, likely brought Buddhism with them independent of the transmission as recorded in court chronicles. Some Japanese sources mention this explicitly. For example, the Heian period Fusō Ryakuki (Abridged Annals of Japan, lit. 'Brief history of Fusang') mentions a foreigner known in Japanese as Shiba no Tatsuto, who may have been Chinese-born, Baekje-born, or a descendant of an immigrant group in Japan. He is said to have built a thatched hut in Yamato and enshrined an object of worship there. Immigrants like this may have been a source for the Soga clan's later sponsorship of Buddhism.

The Nihon Shoki (Chronicles of Japan) provides a date of 552 for when King Seong of Baekje (now western South Korea) sent a mission to Emperor Kinmei that included an image of the Buddha Shakyamuni, ritual banners, and sutras. This event is usually considered the official introduction of Buddhism to Japan. Other sources, however, give the date of 538 and both dates are thought to be unreliable. However, it can still be said that in the middle of the sixth century, Buddhism was introduced through official diplomatic channels.

According to the Nihon Shoki, after receiving the Buddhist gifts, the Japanese emperor asked his officials if the Buddha should be worshipped in Japan. They were divided on the issue, with Soga no Iname (506–570) supporting the idea while Mononobe no Okoshi and Nakatomi no Kamako worried that the kami of Japan would become angry at this worship of a foreign deity. The Nihon Shoki then states that the emperor allowed only the Soga clan to worship the Buddha, to test it out.

Thus, the powerful Soga clan played a key role in the early spread of Buddhism in the country. Their support, along with that of immigrant groups like the Hata clan, gave Buddhism its initial impulse in Japan along with its first temple (Hōkō-ji, also known as Asukadera). The Nakatomi and Mononobe, however, continued to oppose the Soga, blaming their worship for disease and disorder. These opponents of Buddhism are even said to have thrown the image of the Buddha into the Naniwa canal. Eventually outright war erupted. The Soga side, led by Soga no Umako and a young Prince Shōtoku, emerged victorious and promoted Buddhism on the archipelago with support of the broader court.

Based on traditional sources, Shōtoku has been seen as an ardent Buddhist who taught, wrote on, and promoted Buddhism widely, especially during the reign of Empress Suiko (554 – 15 April 628). He is also believed to have sent envoys to China and is even seen as a spiritually accomplished bodhisattva who is the true founder of Japanese Buddhism. Modern historians have questioned much of this, seeing most of it as a constructed hagiography. A popular quote attributed to Shōtoku that became foundational for Buddhist belief in Japan is translated as "The world is vain and illusory, and the Buddha's realm alone is true." Regardless of his actual historical role, however, it is beyond doubt that Shōtoku became an important figure in Japanese Buddhist lore beginning soon after his death if not earlier.

Taoist traditions of immortality and becoming a xian made it to Japan in the times of early Buddhism, but Buddhism absorbed them. "[U]nder Buddhist influence," these stories were "associated with certain ascetic monks who were devoted to the Lotus Sutra."

==== Asuka Buddhism (552–645) ====
Asuka period (538 to 710) Buddhism (Asuka bukkyō) refers to Buddhist practice and thought that mainly developed after 552 in the Nara Basin. Buddhism grew here through the support and efforts of two main groups: immigrant kinship groups like the Hata clan, who were experts in Chinese technology as well as intellectual and material culture, and through aristocratic clans like the Soga clan.

Immigrant groups, like the Korean monks who supposedly instructed Prince Shōtoku, introduced Buddhist learning, administration, ritual practice, and the skills to build Buddhist art and architecture. They included individuals like Hyegwan (dates unknown), a Goguryeo priest of the Madhyamaka school, who, according to the Nihon Shoki, was appointed to the highest rank of primary monastic prelate (僧正, sōjō).

Aside from the Buddhist immigrant groups, Asuka Buddhism was mainly the purview of aristocratic clans like the Soga and related clans, who patronized clan temples to express their power and influence. These temples mainly focused on the performance of rituals which were believed to provide magical effects, such as protection. During this period, Buddhist art in Japan was dominated by the style of Tori Busshi, who came from a Korean immigrant family.

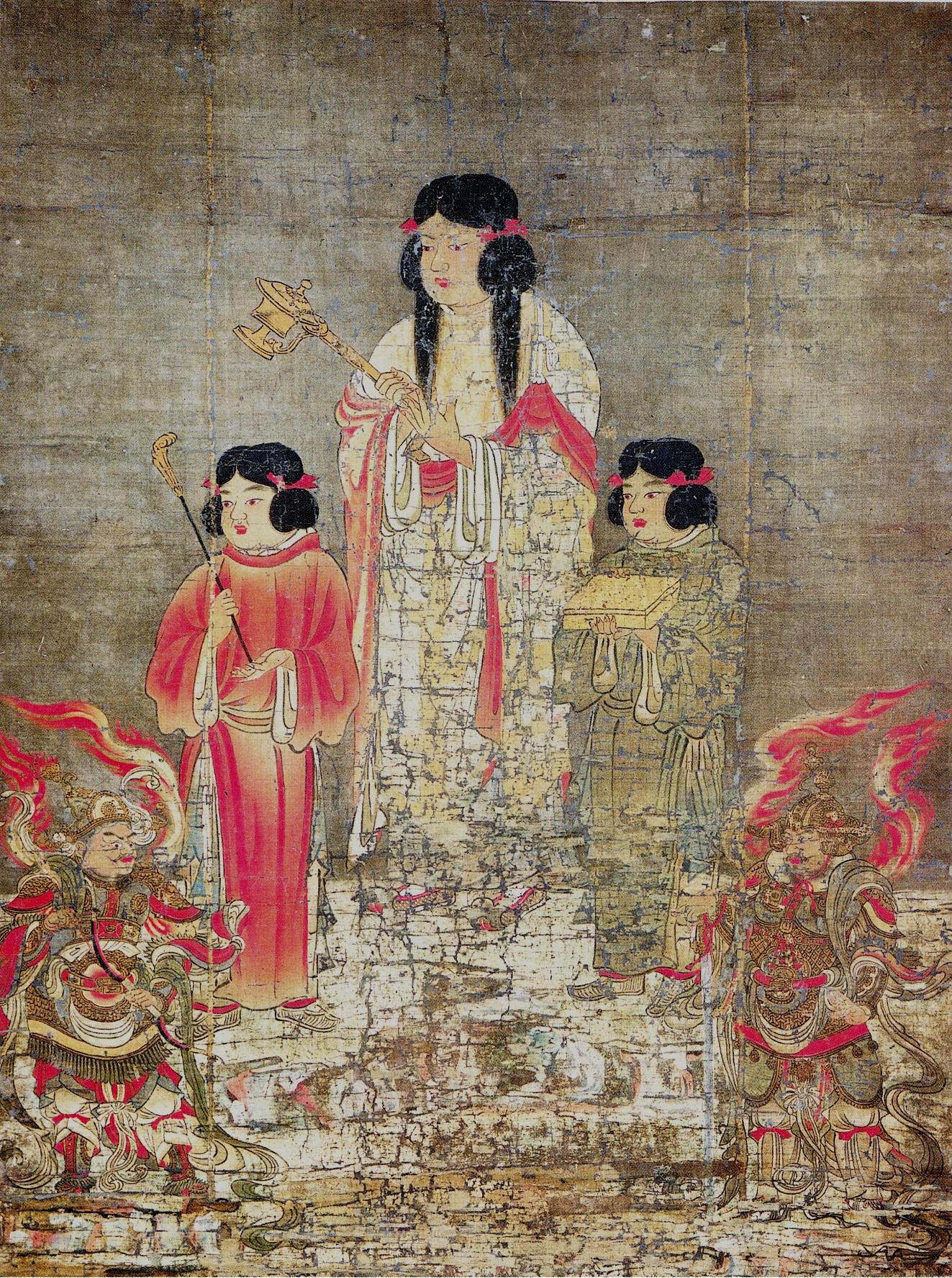
Painting on silk of the semi-legendary Prince Shōtoku, first major sponsor of Buddhism in Japan

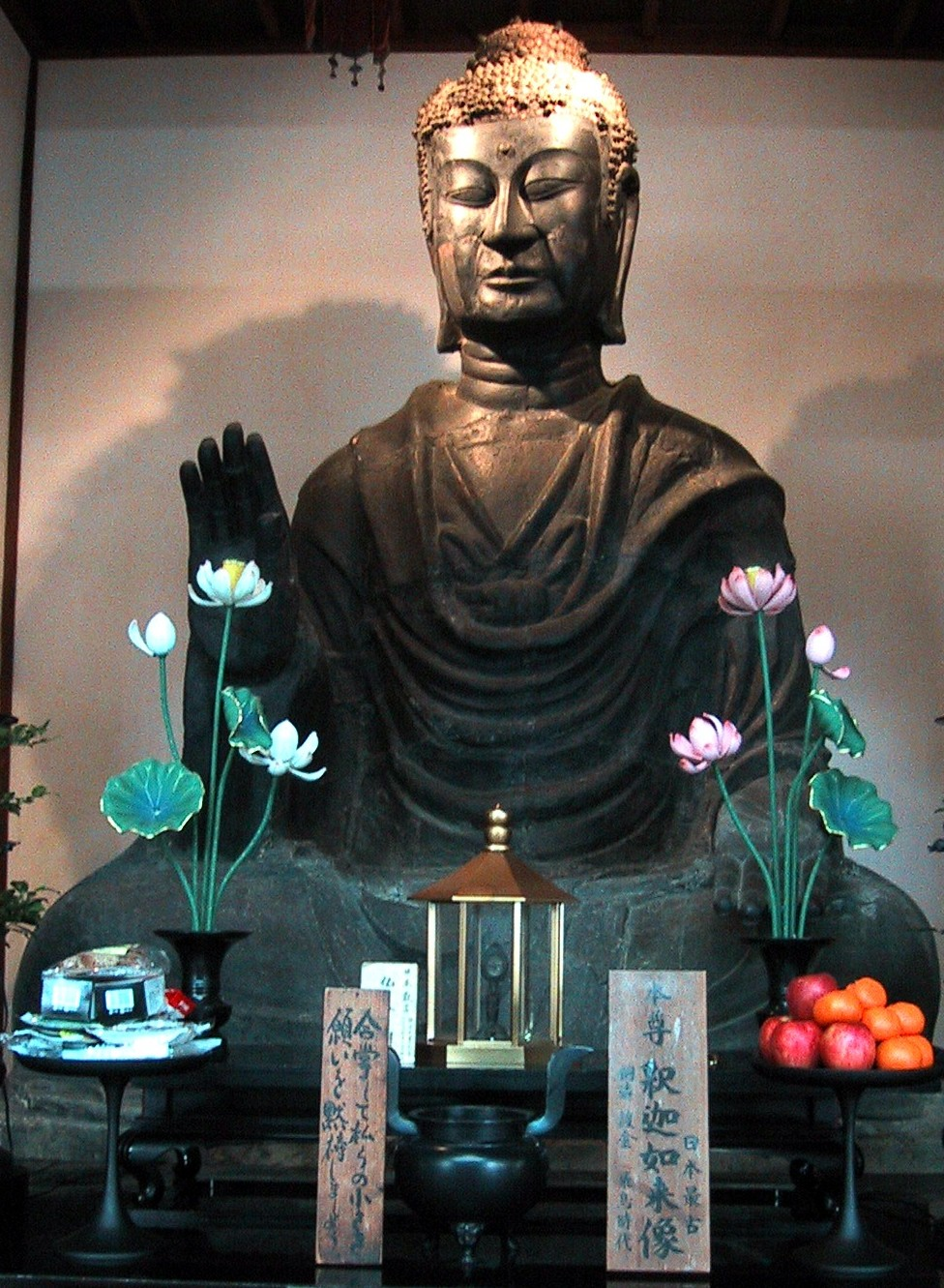
The Great Buddha of Asuka-dera, the oldest Buddha statue in Japan, and an example of the Tori style

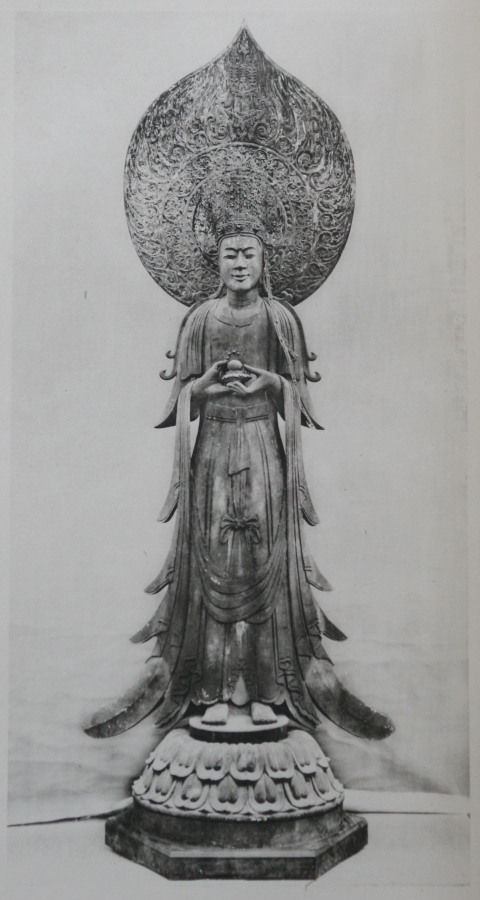
The Kannon of the Dream Hall of Hōryū-ji, another example of Tori style

==== Hakuhō Buddhism (645–710) ====
Buddhism during the reign of Emperor Tenmu (the Hakuhō period, 673 through 686) saw the Imperial House assume official patronage of Buddhism, replacing the Soga as its main patron. Japanese Buddhism at this time was also influenced by Tang dynasty (618–907) Buddhism. It was also during this time that Buddhism began to spread from the Yamato Province to the other regions and islands of Japan. An important part of the centralizing Taika Reform of this era was the use of Buddhist institutions and rituals, often performed at the palace or capital, in service of the state.

The imperial government also actively built and managed temples and the monastic community. The Nihon Shoki states that in 624, there were 46 Buddhist temples. Some of these temples include Kawara-dera and Yakushi-ji. Archeological research has also revealed numerous local and regional temples outside of the capital. At the state temples, Buddhist rituals were performed in order to create merit for the royal family and the well-being of the nation. Particular attention was paid to rituals centered around Buddhist texts such as the Golden Light Sutra.

The sangha (monastic community) was overseen by the complex and hierarchical imperial Monastic Office (sōgō), which managed everything from the monastic code to the colour of the robes.

==== Nara Buddhism (710–794) ====
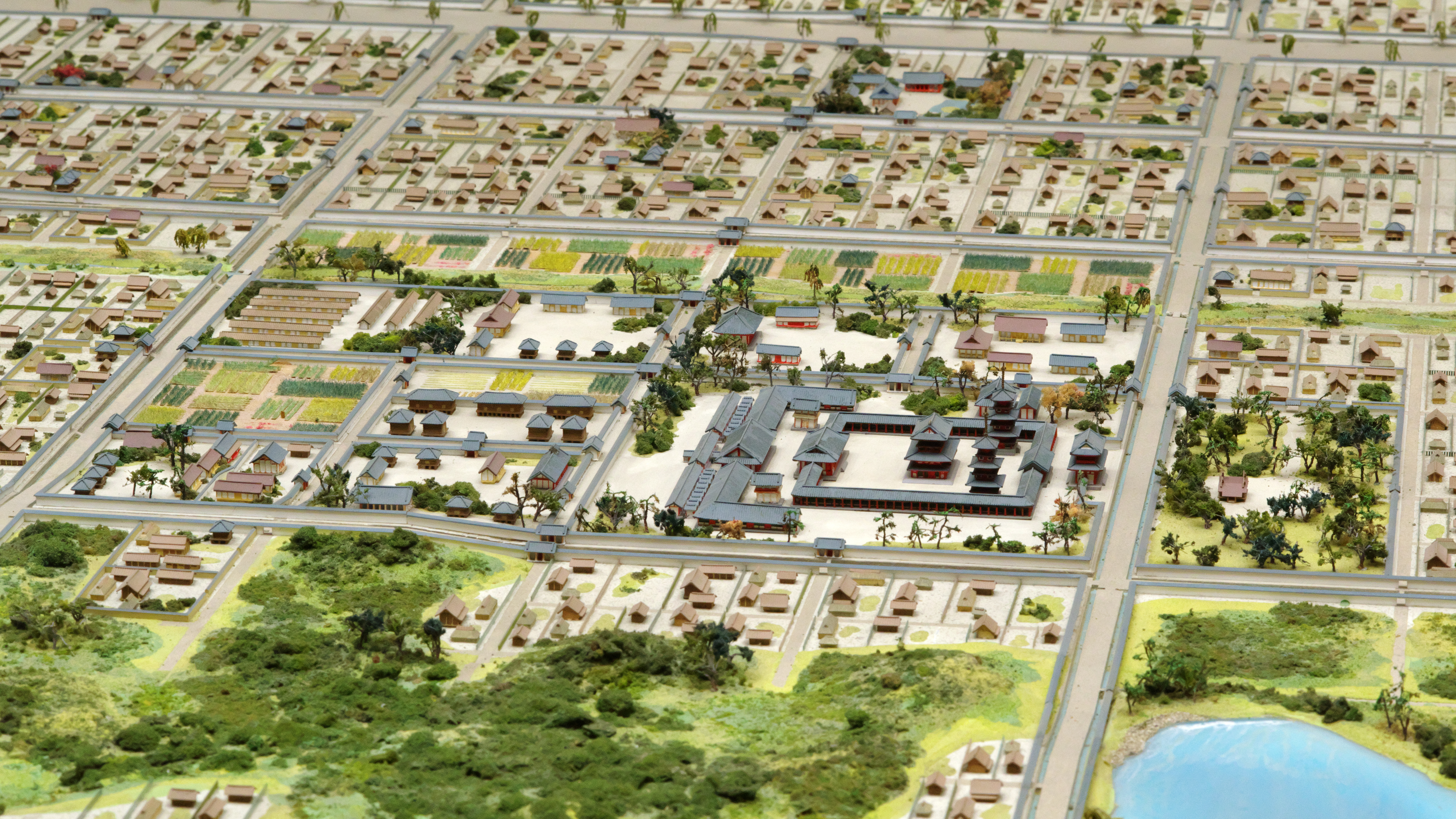
A model of Yakushi-ji, a major imperial temple of Nara

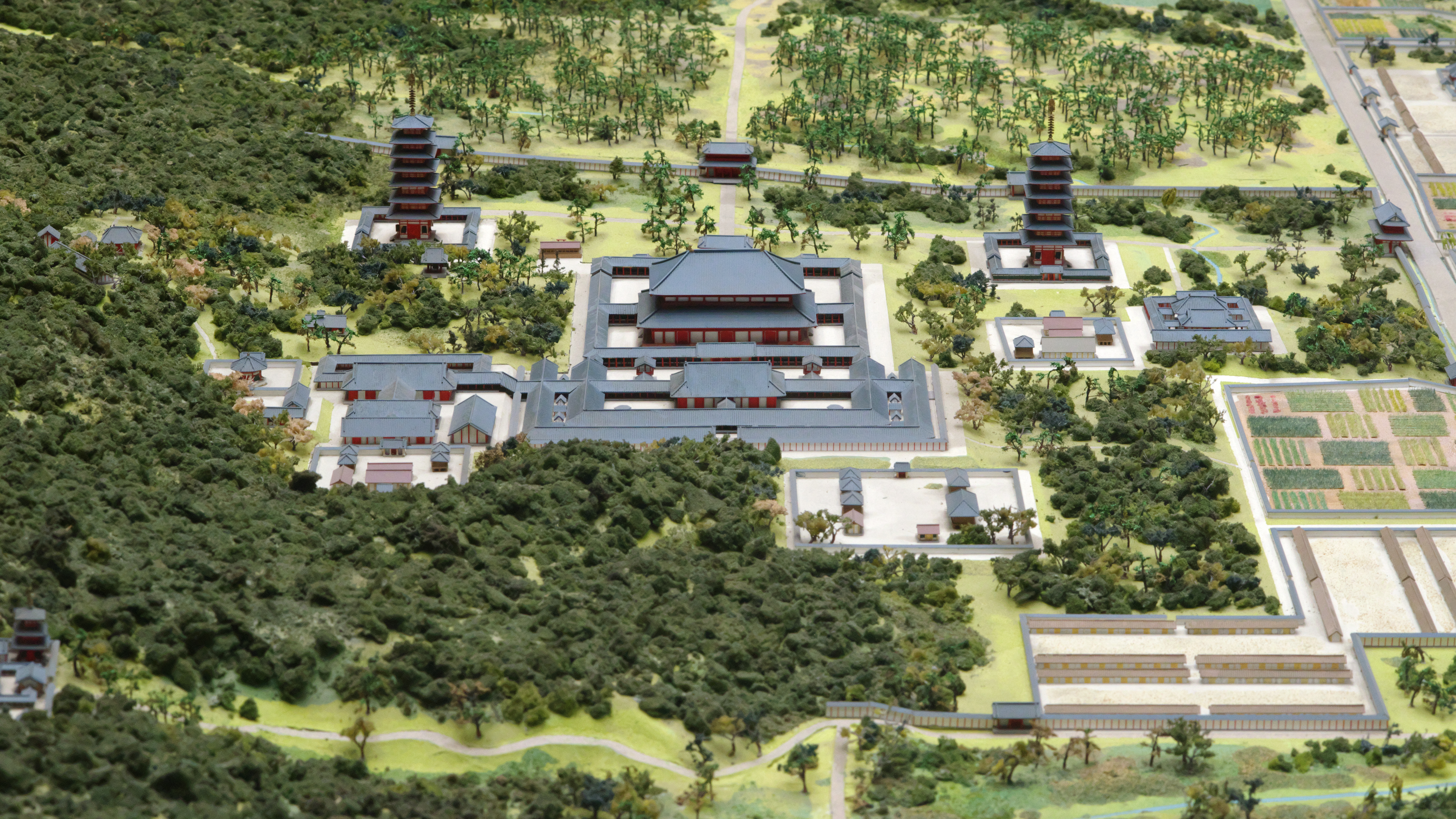
Model of the garan of Todai-ji seen from the north side

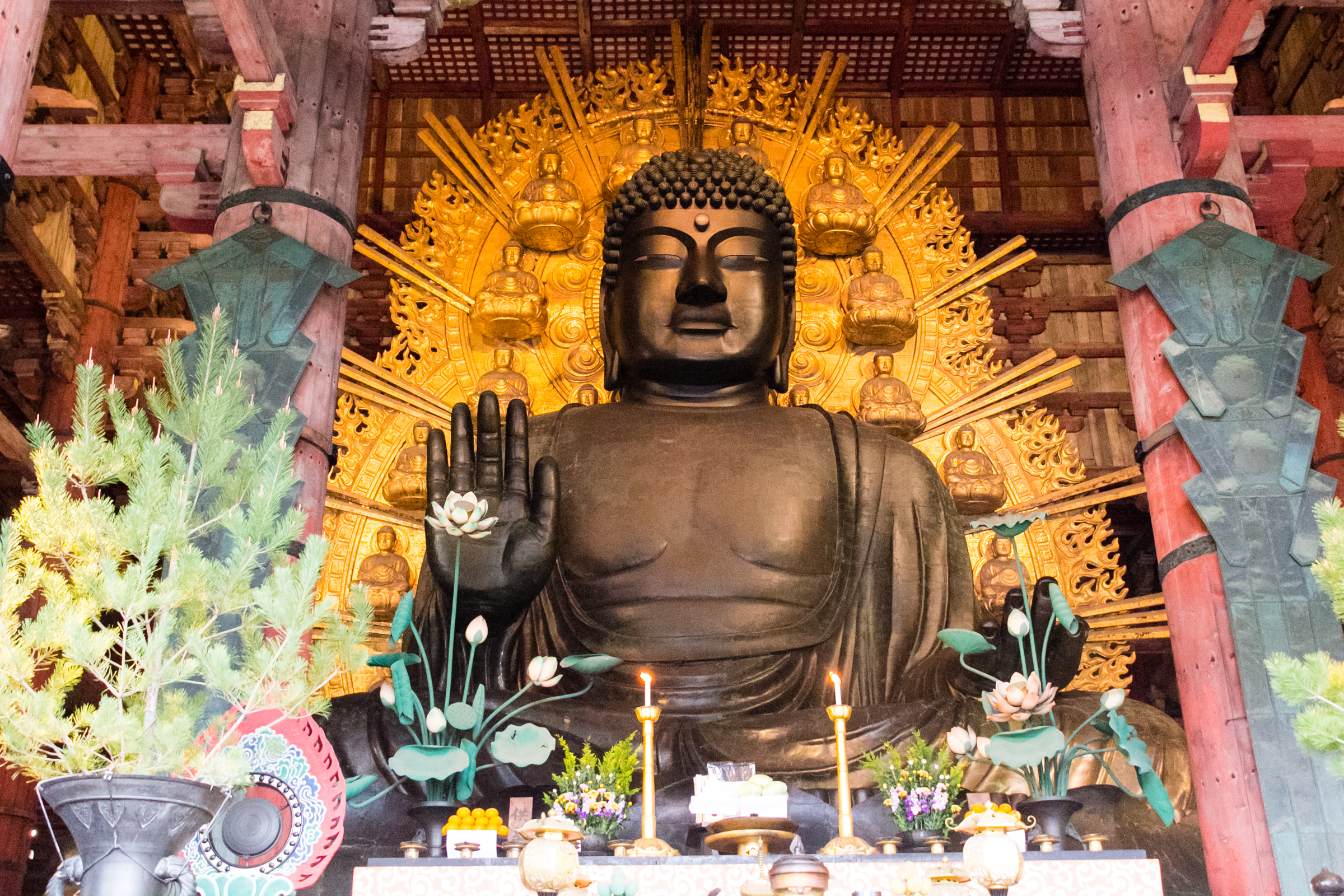
Todai-ji's Great Buddha (Daibutsu)

In 710, Empress Genme moved the state capital to Heijōkyō, (modern Nara) thus inaugurating the Nara period. This period saw the establishment of the kokubunji system, which was a way to manage provincial temples through a network of national temples in each province. The head temple of the entire system was Tōdai-ji (completed in 752).

Nara state sponsorship saw the development of the six great Nara schools, called Nanto Rokushū (南都六宗, lit. the Six Sects of the Southern Capital), all were continuations of Chinese Buddhist schools. The temples of these schools became important places for the study of Buddhist doctrine. The six Nara schools were: Ritsu (Vinaya), Jōjitsu (Tattvasiddhi), Kusha-shū (Abhidharmakosha), Sanronshū (East Asian Mādhyamaka), Hossō (East Asian Yogācāra) and Kegon (Huayan).

These schools were centered around the capital where great temples such as the Asuka-dera and Tōdai-ji were erected. The most influential of the temples are known as the "seven great temples of the southern capital" (Nanto Shichi Daiji). The temples were not exclusive and sectarian organizations. Instead, temples were apt to have scholars versed in several of schools of thought. It has been suggested that they can best be thought of as "study groups".

State temples continued the practice of conducting numerous rituals for the good of the nation and the imperial family. Rituals centered on scriptures like the Golden Light and the Lotus Sūtra. Another key function of the state temples was the transcription of Buddhist scriptures, which was seen as generating much merit. Buddhist monastics were firmly controlled by the state's monastic office through an extensive monastic code of law, and monastic ranks were matched to the ranks of government officials. It was also during this era that the Nihon Shoki was written, a text which shows significant Buddhist influence. The monk Dōji (?–744) may have been involved in its compilation.

The elite state sponsored Nara Buddhism was not the only type of Buddhism at this time. There were also groups of unofficial monastics or priests (or, self-ordained; shido sōni) who were either not formally ordained and trained through the state channels, or who chose to preach and practice outside of the system. These "unofficial" monks were often subject to state punishment. Their practice could have also included Daoist and indigenous kami worship elements. Some of these figures became immensely popular and were a source of criticism for the sophisticated, academic and bureaucratic Buddhism of the capital.

==== Early Heian Period Buddhism (794–950) ====
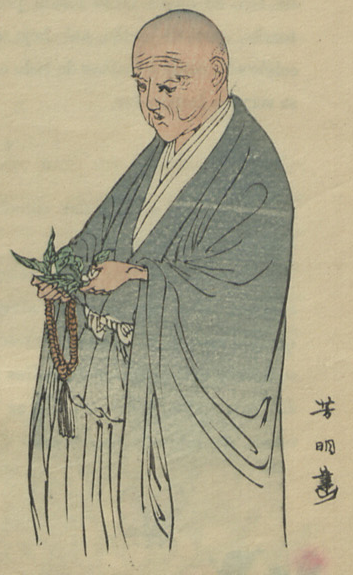
An illustration of Saichō with tea leaves. He is known for having introduced tea to Japan.

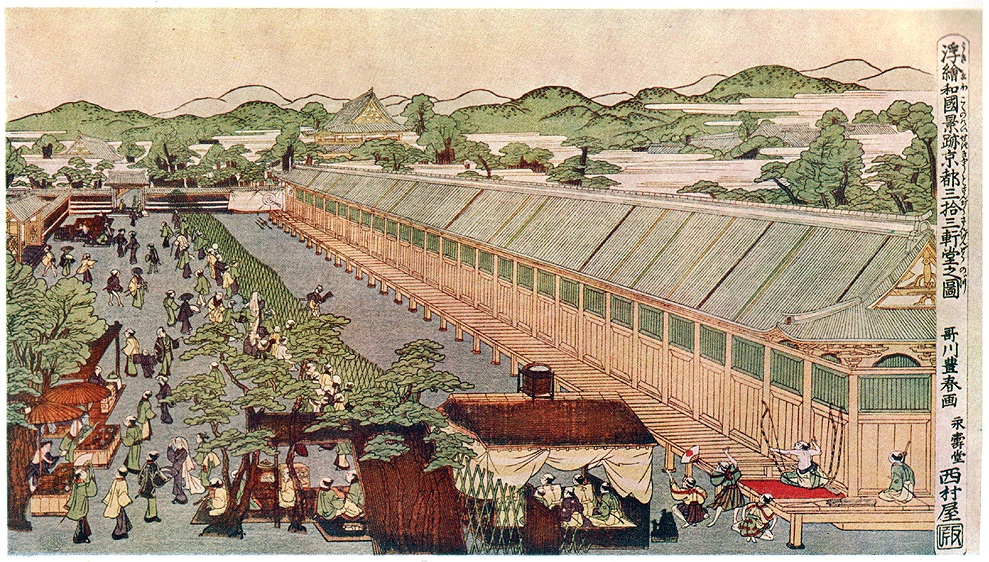
Sanjūsangen-dō in Kyoto, a print of a Tendai temple, by Toyoharu, c. 1772–1781

During the Heian period, the capital was shifted to Kyoto (then known as Heiankyō) by emperor Kanmu, mainly for economic and strategic reasons. As before, Buddhist institutions continued to play a key role in the state, with Kanmu being a strong supporter of the new Tendai school of Saichō (767–822) in particular. Saichō, who had studied the Tiantai school in China, established the influential temple complex of Enryakuji at Mount Hiei, and developed a new system of monastic regulations based on the bodhisattva precepts. This new system allowed Tendai to free itself from direct state control.

Also during this period, the Shingon ( Ch. Zhenyan; "True Word", from Sanskrit: "Mantra") school was established in the country under the leadership of Kūkai. This school also received state sponsorship and introduced esoteric Vajrayana (also referred to as mikkyō, "secret teaching") elements.

The new Buddhist lineages of Shingon and Tendai also developed somewhat independently from state control, partly because the old system was becoming less important to Heian aristocrats. This period also saw an increase in the official separation between the different schools, due to a new system that specified the particular school which an imperial priest (nenbundosha) belonged to.

==== Later Heian Period Buddhism (950–1185) ====
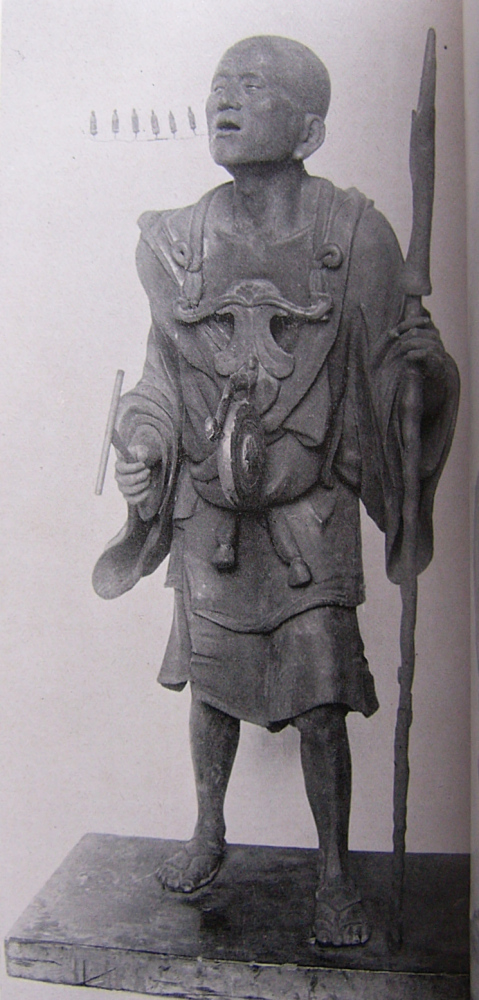
Statue of Kūya by Kōshō, son of Unkei, dating to the first decade of the thirteenth century. The six syllables of the nembutsu, na-mu-a-mi-da-butsu, are represented literally by six small Amida figures streaming from Kūya's mouth.

During this period, there was a consolidation of a series of annual court ceremonies (nenjū gyōji). Tendai Buddhism was particularly influential, and the veneration of the Lotus Sūtra grew in popularity, even among the low class and non-aristocratic population, which often formed religious groups such as the "Lotus holy ones" (hokke hijiri or jikyōja) and mountain ascetics (shugenja). Shugendō is an example of the fusion of Shinto mountain worship and Buddhism. The aim of Shugendo practitioners is to save the masses by acquiring supernatural powers through rigorous training while walking through steep mountains.

Furthermore, during this era, new Buddhist traditions began to develop. While some of these have been grouped into what is referred to as "new Kamakura" Buddhism, their beginning can actually be traced to the late Heian. This includes the practice of Japanese Pure Land Buddhism, which focuses on the contemplation and chanting of the nenbutsu, the name of the Buddha Amida (Skt. Amitābha), in hopes of being reborn in the Buddha field of Sukhāvatī. This practice was initially popular in Tendai monasteries but then spread throughout Japan. Texts discussing miracles associated with the Buddhas and bodhisattvas became popular in this period, along with texts which outlined death bed rites.

During this period, some Buddhist temples established groups of warrior-monks called Sōhei. This phenomenon began in Tendai temples, as they vied for political influence with each other. The Genpei war saw various groups of warrior monks join the fray.

There were also semi-independent clerics (who were called shōnin or hijiri, "holy ones") who lived away from the major Buddhist monasteries and preached to the people. These figures had much more contact with the general populace than other monks. The most well known of these figures was Kūya (alt. Kōya; 903–972), who wandered throughout the provinces engaging in good works (sazen), preaching on nembutsu practice and working with local Buddhist cooperatives (zenchishiki) to create images of bodhisattvas like Kannon.

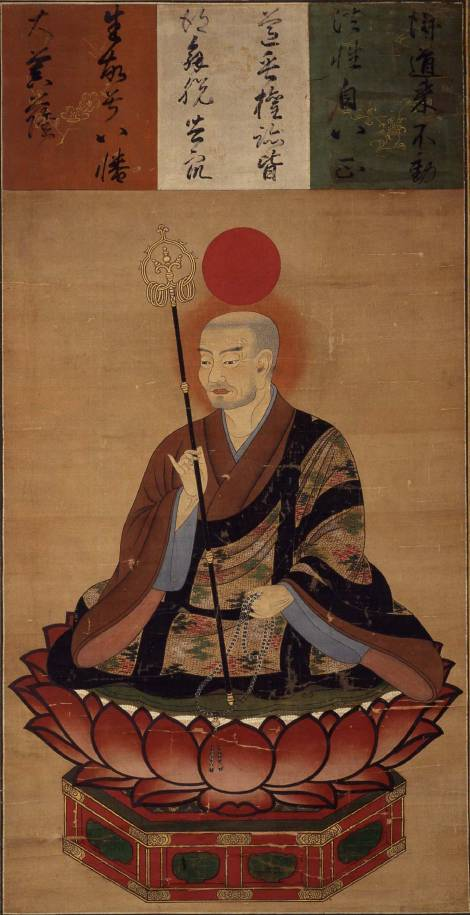
A scroll depicting the kami Hachiman dressed as a Buddhist monk, an example of Shinbutsu-shūgō ("syncretism of kami and buddhas").

Another important development during this era was that Buddhist monks were now being widely encouraged by the state to pray for the salvation of Japanese kami (divine beings in Shinto). The merging of Shinto deities with Buddhist practice was not new at this time. Already in the eighth century, some major Shinto shrines (jingūji) included Buddhist monks which conducted rites for shinto divinities. One of the earliest such figures was "great Bodhisattva Hachiman" (Hachiman daibosatsu) who was popular in Kyūshū.

Popular sites for pilgrimage and religious practice, like Kumano, included both kami worship and the worship of Buddhas and bodhisattvas, which were often associated with each other. Furthermore, temples like Tōdai-ji also included shrines for the worship of kami (in Tōdai-ji's case, it was the kami Shukongōjin that was enshrined in its rear entryway).

Buddhist monks interpreted their relationship to the kami in different ways. Some monks saw them as just worldly beings who could be prayed for. Other saw them as manifestations of Buddhas and bodhisattvas. For example, the Mt. Hiei monk Eryō saw the kami as "traces" (suijaku) of the Buddha. This idea, called essence-trace (honji-suijaku), would have a strong influence throughout the medieval era.

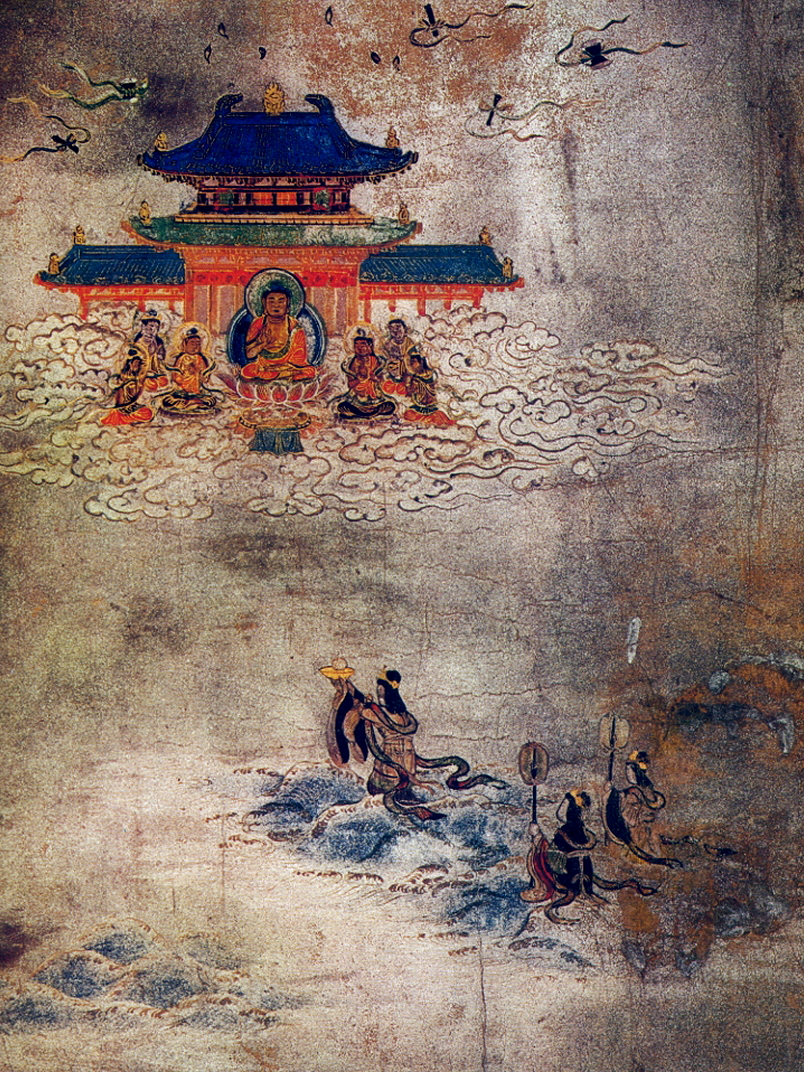
Sutra art from the Heike-Nôkyô, chapter 12.

The copying and writing of Buddhist scripture was a widespread practice in this period. It was seen as producing merit (good karma). Artistic portraits depicting events from the scriptures were also quite popular during this era. They were used to generate merit as well as to preach and teach the doctrine. The "Enshrined Sutra of the Taira Family" (Heikenōkyō), is one of the greatest examples of Buddhist visual art from this period. It is an elaborately illustrated Lotus Sūtra installed at Itsukushima Shrine.

The Buddhist liturgy of this era also became more elaborate and performative. Rites such as the Repentance Assembly (keka'e) at Hōjōji developed to include elaborate music, dance and other forms of performance. Major temples and monasteries such as the royal Hosshōji temple and Kōfukuji, also became home to the performance of Sarugaku theater (which is the origin of Nō Drama) as well as ennen ("longevity-enhancing") arts which included dances and music. Doctrinally, these performative arts were seen as skillful means (hōben, Skt. upaya) of teaching Buddhism. Monks specializing in such arts were called yūsō ("artistic monks").

Another way of communicating the Buddhist message was through the medium of poetry, which included both Chinese poetry (kanshi) and Japanese poetry (waka). An example of Buddhist themed waka is Princess Senshi's (964–1035) Hosshin waka shū (Collection of Waka of the Awakening Mind, 1012). The courtly practice of rōei (performing poetry to music) was also taken up in the Tendai and Shingon lineages. Both monks and laypersons met in poetry circles (kadan) like the Ninnaji circle which was patronized by Prince Shukaku (1150–1202).

=== Kamakura Buddhism (1185–1333) - new schools of Buddhism ===
The Kamakura period (1185–1333) was a period of crisis in which the control of the country moved from the imperial aristocracy to the samurai. In 1185 the Kamakura shogunate was established at Kamakura.

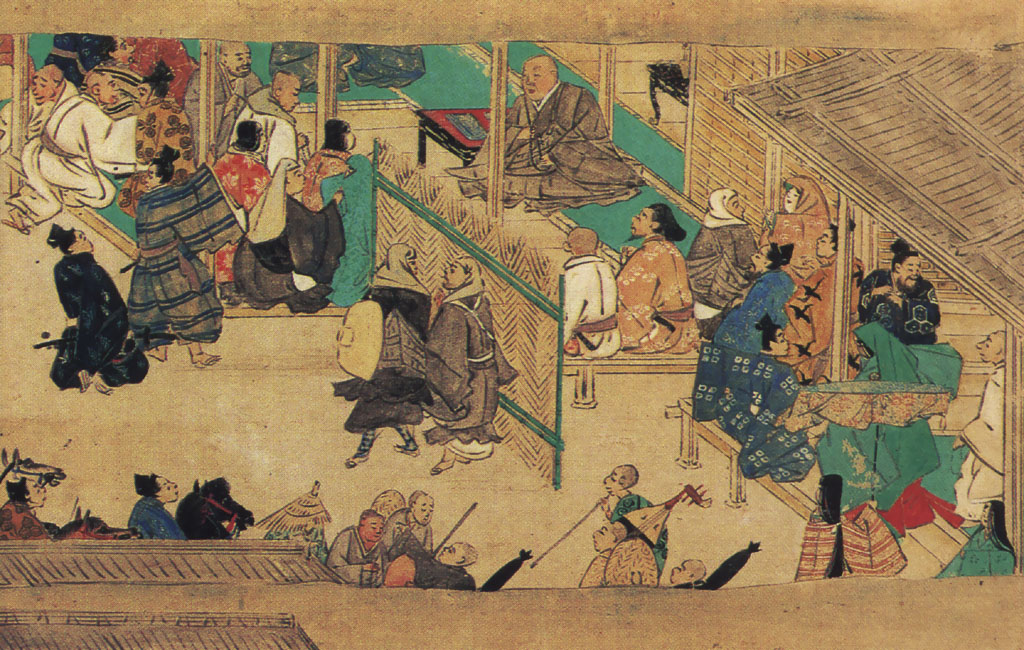
An illustration of Hōnen preaching

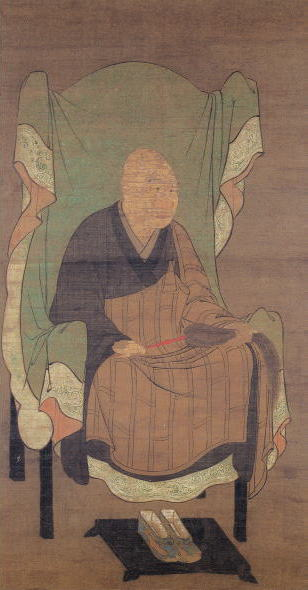
Ninshō

This period saw the development of new Buddhist lineages or schools which have been called "Kamakura Buddhism" and "New Buddhism". All of the major founders of these new lineages were ex-Tendai monks who had trained at Mt. Hiei and had studied the exoteric and esoteric systems of Tendai Buddhism. During the Kamakura period, these new schools did not gain as much prominence as the older lineages, with the possible exception of the highly influential Rinzai Zen school.

Among the founders of the forty-six sects in Japanese Zen, sixteen were Chinese masters, fifteen were Japanese masters who traveled to China during the reign of the Song dynasty, and another fifteen were Japanese masters who visited China during the reign of the Yuan dynasty.

The new schools include Pure Land lineages like Hōnen's (1133–1212) Jōdo shū and Shinran's (1173–1263) Jōdo Shinshū, both of which focused on the practice of chanting the name of Amida Buddha. These new Pure Land schools both believed that Japan had entered the era of the decline of the Dharma (mappō) and that therefore other Buddhist practices were not useful. The only means to liberation was now the faithful chanting of the nembutsu. This view was critiqued by more traditional figures such as Myō'e (1173–1232).

Another response to the social instability of the period was an attempt by certain monks to return to the proper practice of Buddhist precepts as well as meditation. These figures include figures like the Kōfukuji monk Jōkei (1155–1213) and the Tendai monk Shunjō (1166–1227), who sought to return to the traditional foundations of the Buddhist path, ethical cultivation and meditation practice.

Other monks attempted to minister to marginalized low class groups. The Kegon-Shingon monk Myō'e was known for opening his temple to lepers, beggars, and other marginal people, while precept masters such as Eison (1201–1290) and Ninshō (1217–1303) were also active in ministering and caring for ill and marginalized persons, particularly those outcast groups termed "non-persons" (hinin). Deal & Ruppert (2015) p. 122 Ninshō established a medical facility at Gokurakuji in 1287, which treated more than 88,000 people over a 34-year-period and collected Chinese medical knowledge.

Another set of new Kamakura schools include the two major Zen schools of Japan (Rinzai and Sōtō), promulgated by monks such as Eisai and Dōgen, which emphasize liberation through the insight of meditation (zazen). Dōgen (1200–1253) began a prominent meditation teacher and abbot. He introduced the Chan lineage of Caodong, which would grow into the Sōtō school. He criticized ideas like the final age of the Dharma (mappō), and the practice of apotropaic prayer.

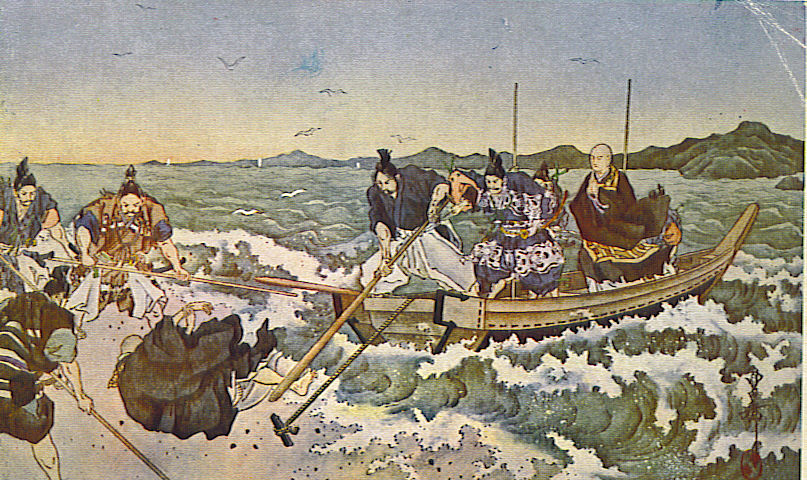
A 20th century depiction of the banishment of Nichiren in 1261.

Additionally, it was during this period that monk Nichiren (1222–1282) began teaching his exclusively Lotus Sutra based Buddhism, which he saw as the only valid object of devotion in the age of mappō. Nichiren believed that the conflicts and disasters of this period were caused by the wrong views of Japanese Buddhists (such as the followers of Pure Land and esoteric Buddhism). Nichiren faced much opposition for his views and was also attacked and exiled twice by the Kamakura state.

=== Muromachi period (1336–1573) and Azuchi–Momoyama period (1573–1603) ===
==== Late Medieval Buddhism (1336–1467) ====
During this period, the new "Kamakura schools" continued to develop and began to consolidate themselves as unique and separate traditions. However, as Deal and Ruppert note, "most of them remained at the periphery of Buddhist institutional power and, in some ways, discourse during this era." They further add that it was only "from the late fifteenth century onward that these lineages came to increasingly occupy the center of Japanese Buddhist belief and practice." The only exception is Rinzai Zen, which attained prominence earlier (13th century). Meanwhile, the "old" schools and lineages continued to develop in their own ways and remained influential.

The new schools' independence from the old schools did not happen all at once. In fact, the new schools remained under the old schools' doctrinal and political influence for some time. For example, Ōhashi Toshio has stressed how during this period, the Jōdo sect was mainly seen as a subsidiary or temporary branch sect of Tendai. Furthermore, not all monks of the old sects were antagonistic to the new sects.

During the height of the medieval era, political power was decentralized and shrine-temple complexes were often competing with each other for influence and power. These complexes often controlled land and multiple manors, and also maintained military forces of warrior monks which they used to battle with each other. In spite of the instability of this era, the culture of Buddhist study and learning continued to thrive and grow.

Furthermore, though there were numerous independent Buddhist schools and lineages at this time, many monks did not exclusively belong to one lineage and instead traveled to study and learn in various temples and seminaries. This tendency of practicing in multiple schools or lineages was termed shoshū kengaku. It became much more prominent in the medieval era due to the increased social mobility that many monks enjoyed.

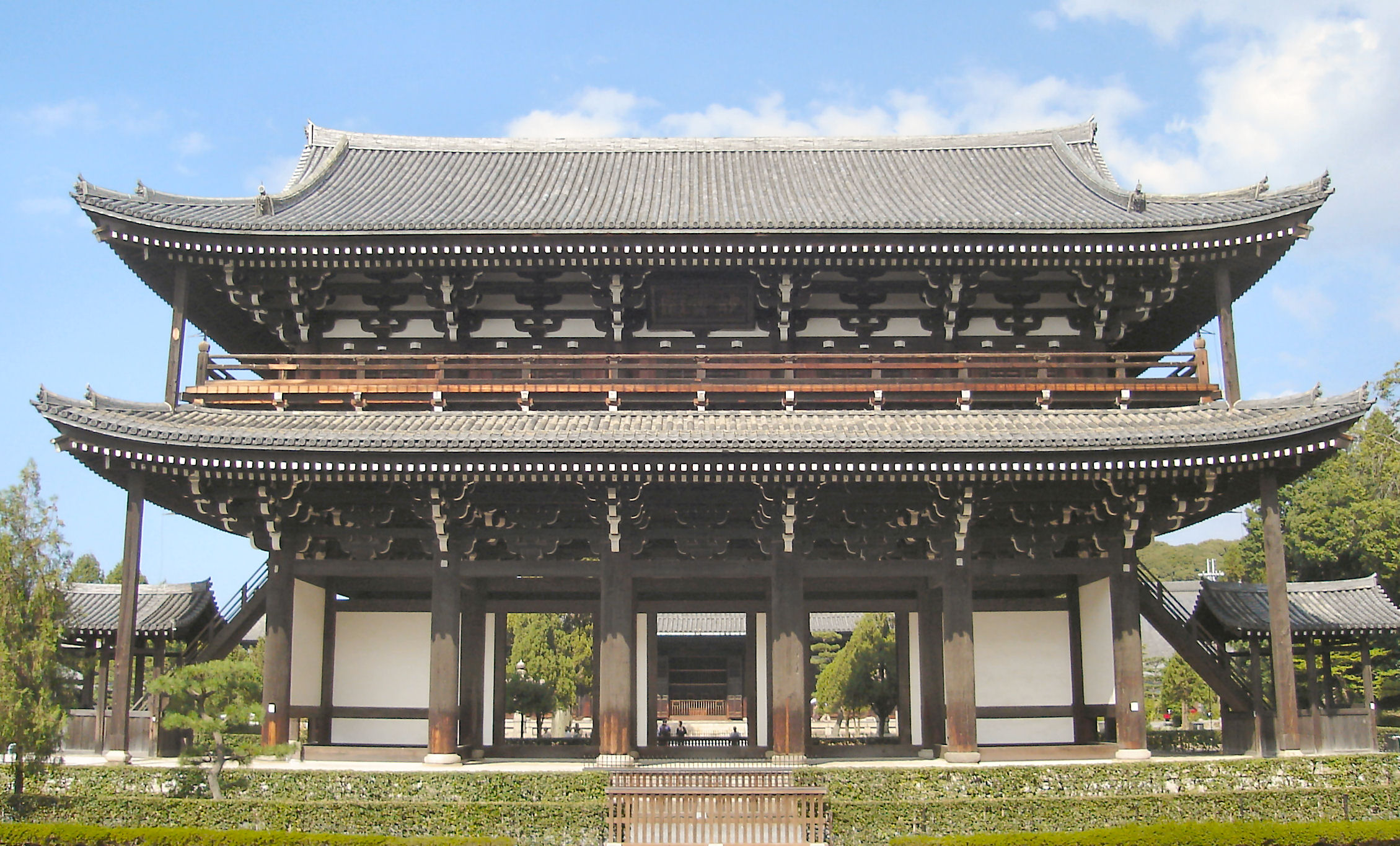
The main gate of Tōfuku-ji, the oldest sanmon in Japan.

Both the Kamakura shogunate (1192–1333) and the Ashikaga shogunate (1336–1573) supported and patronized the "Five Mountains culture" (Gozan Jissetsu Seido) of Rinzai Zen. This Rinzai Zen tradition was centered on the ten "Five Mountain" temples (five in Kyoto and five in Kamakura). Besides teaching zazen meditation, they also pursued studies in esoteric Buddhism and in certain art forms like calligraphy and poetry. A pivotal early figure of Rinzai was Enni Ben'en (1202–1280), a high-ranking and influential monk who was initiated into Tendai and Shingon. He then traveled to China to study Zen and later founded Tōfukuji.

The Tendai and Shingon credentials of Rinzai figures such as Enni show that early Zen was not a lineage that was totally separate from the other "old" schools. Indeed, Zen monastic codes feature procedures for "worship of the Buddha, funerals, memorial rites for ancestral spirits, the feeding of hungry ghosts, feasts sponsored by donors, and tea services that served to highlight the bureaucratic and social hierarchy."

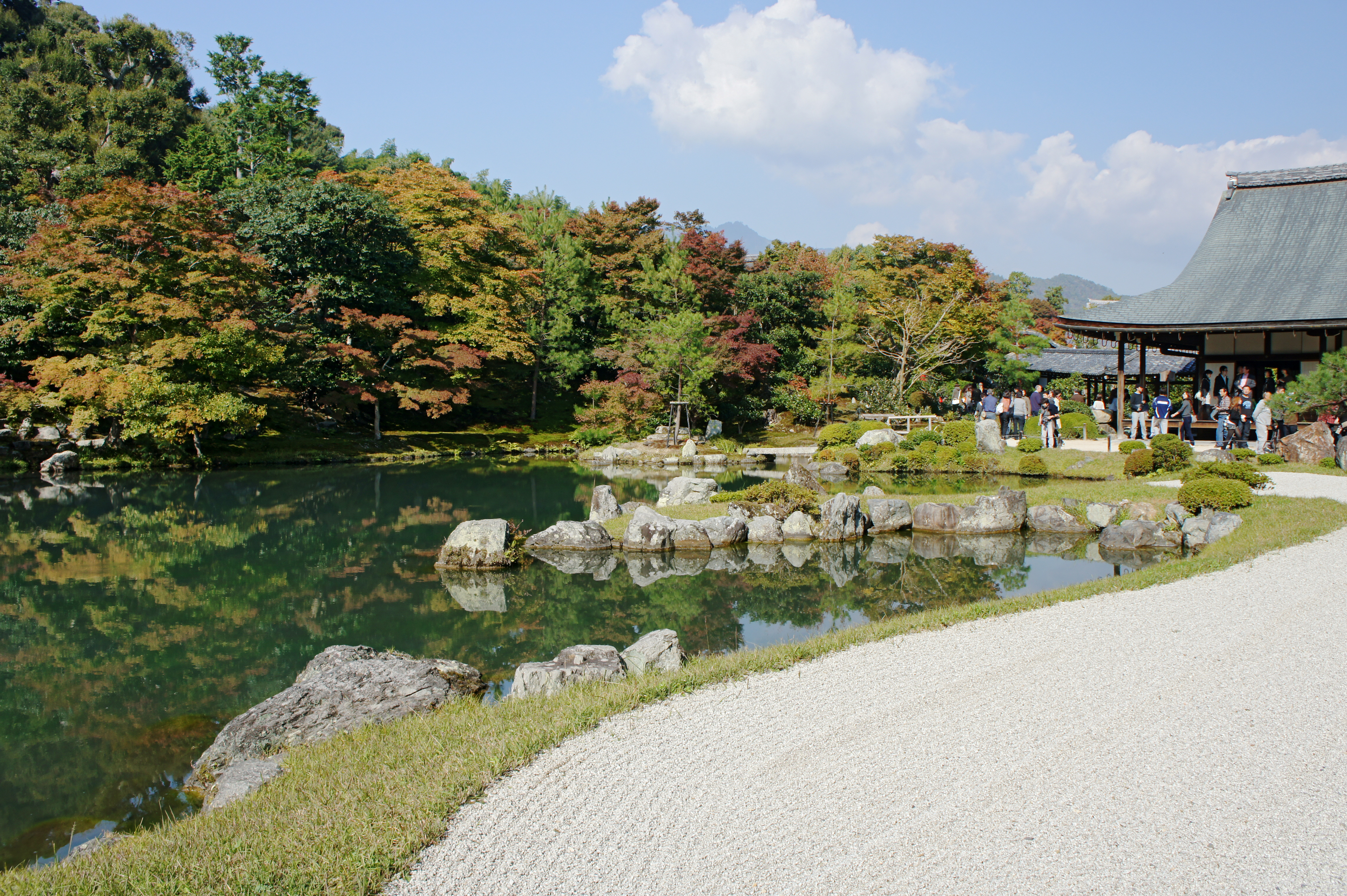
Tenryū-ji's Sōgen Pond, designed by Musō Soseki.

Medieval Rinzai was also invigorated by a series of Chinese masters who came to Japan during the Song dynasty, such as Yishan Yining (1247–1317). Issan influenced the Japanese interest in Chinese literature, calligraphy and painting. The Japanese literature of the Five Mountains (Gozan Bungaku) reflects this influence. One of his students was Musō Soseki, a Zen master, calligraphist, poet and garden designer who was granted the title "national Zen teacher" by Emperor Go-Daigo. The Zen monk poets Sesson Yūbai and Kokan Shiren also studied under Issan. Shiren was also a historian who wrote the Buddhist history Genkō shakusho. Ikkyū Sōjun (1394–1481) was a poet who influenced many Japanese work in Zen Buddhism although there is little evidence of his own wakas, and was influenced by Issan.

The Royal court and elite families of the capital also studied the classic Chinese arts that were being taught in the five mountain Rinzai temples. The shogunal families even built Zen temples in their residential palaces. The five mountain temples also established their own printing program (Gozan-ban) to copy and disseminate a wide variety of literature that included records of Zen masters, the writings of Tang poets, Confucian classics, Chinese dictionaries, reference works, and medical texts.

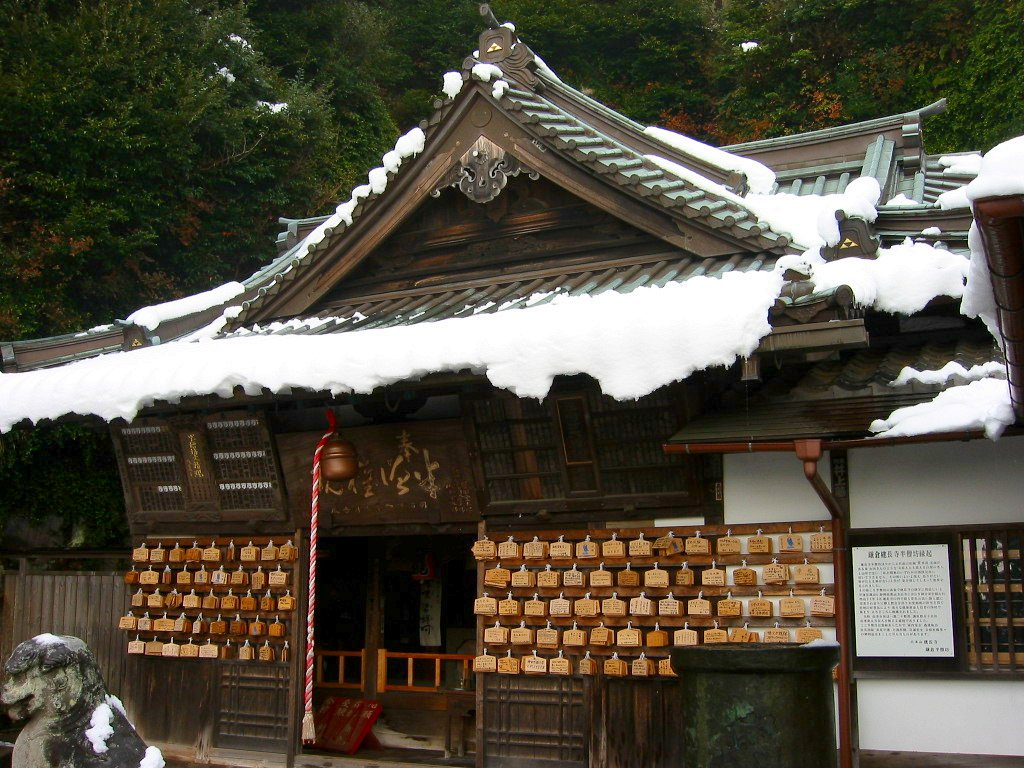
The Hansōbō shrine, a Shinto shrine at the Rinzai temple of Kenchō-ji.

It is also during this period that true lineages of "Shintō" kami worship begin to develop in Buddhist temples complexes, lineages which would become the basis for institutionalized Shintō of later periods. Buddhists continued to develop theories about the relationship between kami and the Buddhas and bodhisattvas. One such idea, gongen ("provisional manifestation"), promoted the worship of kami as manifest forms of the Buddhas. A group of Tendai monks at Mt. Hiei meanwhile incorporated hongaku thought into their worship of the kami Sannō, which eventually came to be seen as the source or "original ground" (honji) of all Buddhas (thereby reversing the old honji suijaku theory which saw the Buddha as the honji). This idea can be found in the work of the Hiei monk Sonshun (1451–1514).

==== Late Muromachi-Period Buddhism (1467–1603) - Ōnin War ====
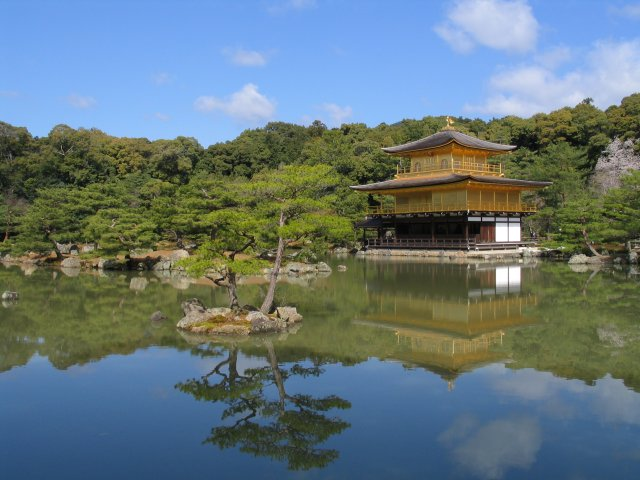
Kinkaku-ji, ("the Temple of the Golden Pavilion'), is a Rinzai Zen temple built in the Muromachi period (c. 1397) and destroyed during the Onin War (it was later rebuilt).

Beginning with the devastating Ōnin War (1467–1477), the late Muromachi period saw the devolution of central government control and the rise of regional samurai warlords called daimyōs and the so called "warring states era" (Sengokuki). During this era of widespread warfare, many Buddhist temples and monasteries were destroyed, particularly in and around Kyoto. Many of these old temples would not be rebuilt until the 16th and 17th centuries.

During this period, the new Kamakura schools rose to a new level of prominence and influence. They also underwent reforms in study and practice which would make them more independent and would last centuries. For example, it was during this period that the True Pure Land monk Rennyo (1415–1499) forged a large following for his school and rebuilt Honganji. He reformed devotional practices with a focus on Shinran and honzon scrolls inscribed with the nembutsu. He also made widespread use of the Japanese vernacular.

The Zen lineages were also widely disseminated throughout the country during this era. A key contributing factor to their spread (as well as to the spread of Pure Land temples) was their activity in funerals and mortuary rituals. Some temple halls were reconstructed with a focus on mortuary rites (sometimes for a specific family, like the Tokugawa) and were thus known as mortuary temples (bodaiji). Furthermore, during this era, schools like Soto Zen, the Hokke (Nichiren) schools and Rennyo's Pure land school also developed comprehensive curricula for doctrinal study, which allowed them to become more self sufficient and independent schools and eliminated the need for their monks to study with other schools.

There was also a decrease in the ritual schedule of the royal court. Because of this, Buddhist Temples which did survive this period had to turn to new ways of fundraising. Aside from mortuary duties, this also included increasing public viewings (kaichōs) of hidden or esoteric images.

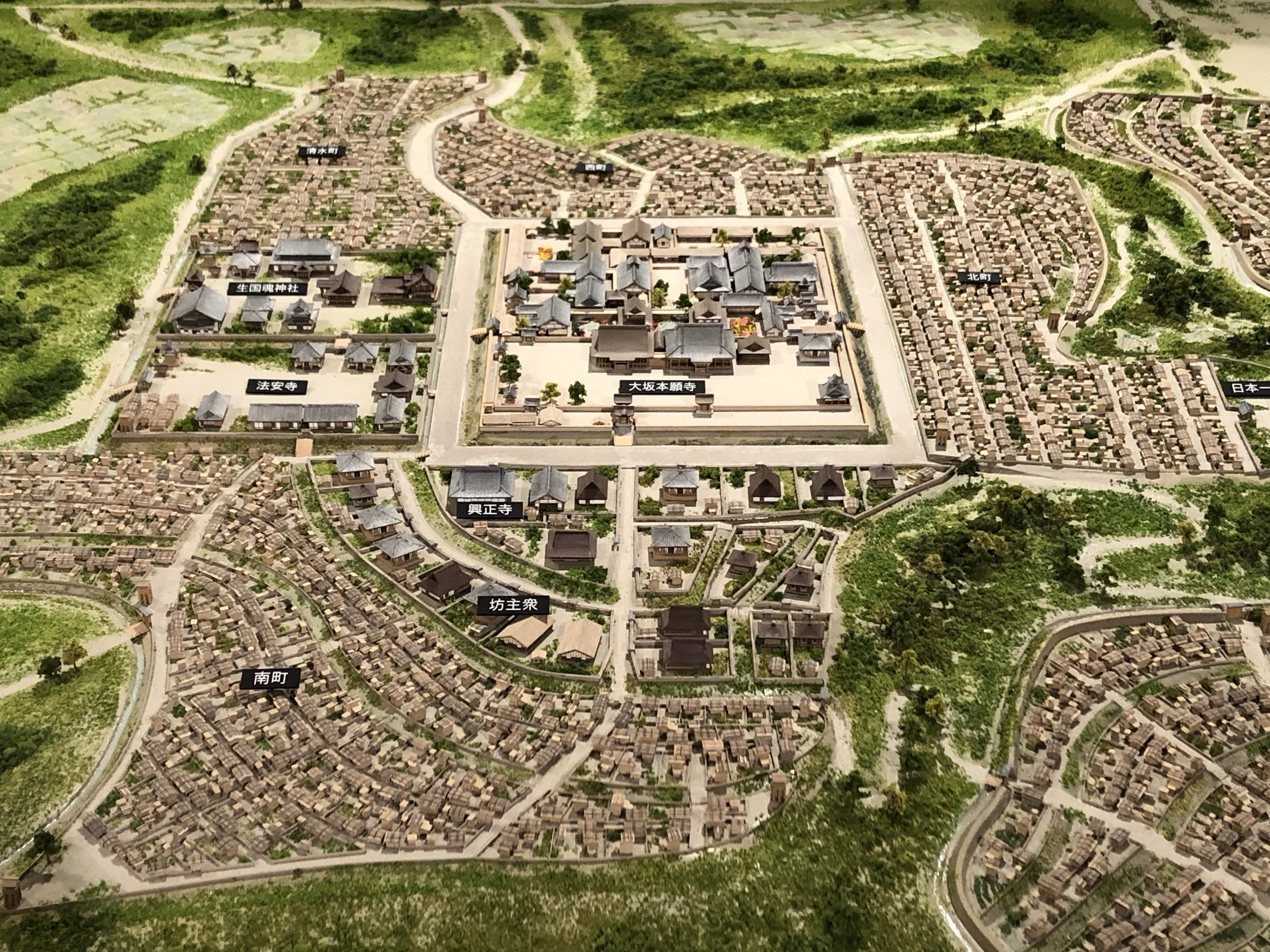
A model of Ishiyama Hongan-ji in Osaka, one of the main fortress-temple complex of the True Pure Land (Jōdo Shinshū) "Devoted League" (Ikko-Ikki).

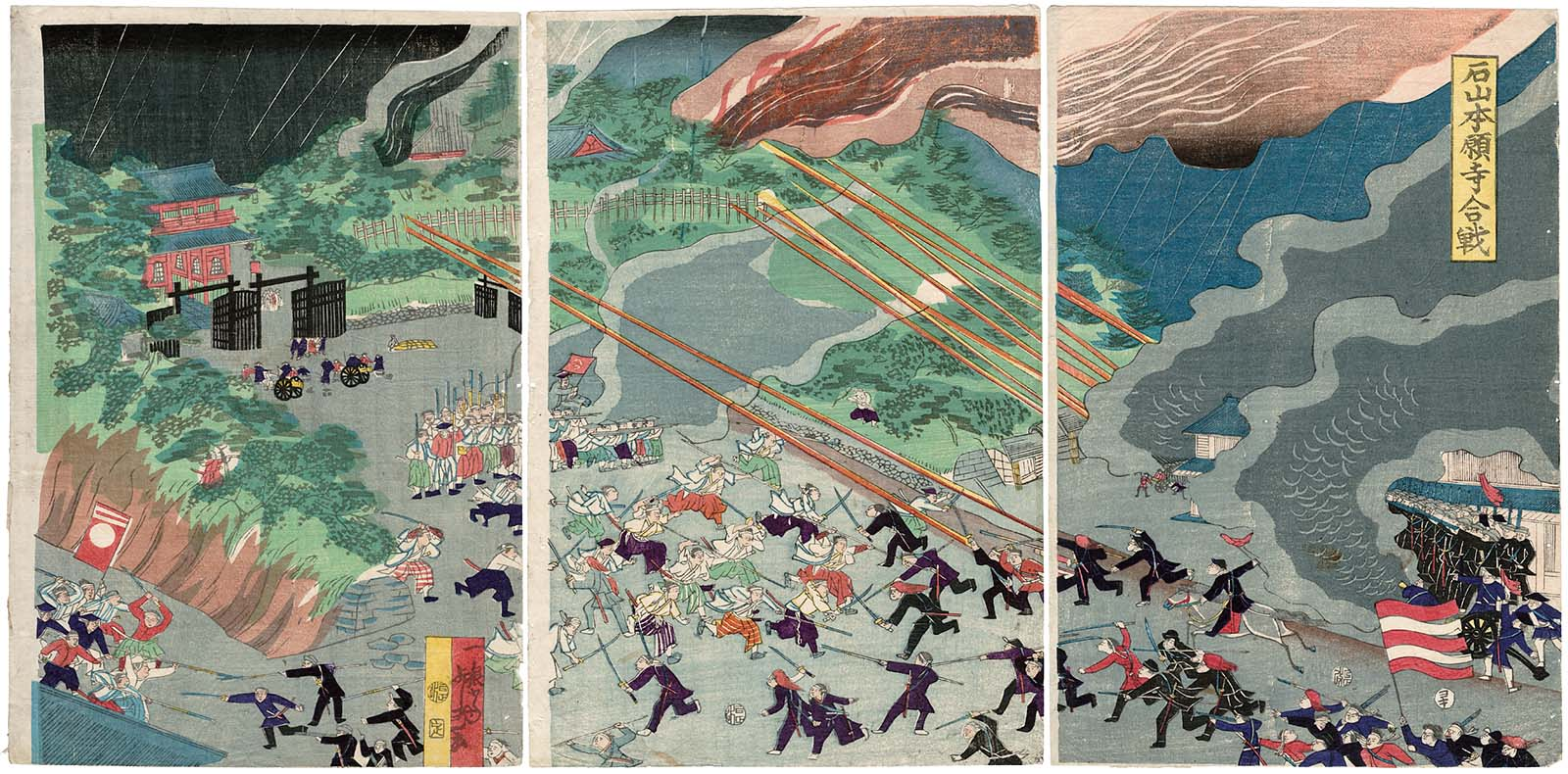
The Battle of Ishiyama Hongan-ji, by Utagawa Yoshifuji

This era also saw the rise of militant Buddhist leagues (ikki), like the Ikko Ikki ("Single Minded" Pure Land Leagues) and Hokke-ikki (Nichirenist "Lotus" Leagues), who rose in revolt against samurai lords and established self-rule in certain regions. These leagues would also sometimes go to war with each other and with major temples. The Hokke-ikki managed to destroy the Ikko Ikki's Yamashina Honganji temple complex and take over much of Kyoto in the 1530s. They eventually came into conflict with the Tendai warrior monks of Enryakuji in what became known as the Tenbun Period War, in which all 21 major Hokke (Nichiren) temples were destroyed, along with much of Kyoto.

The Tendai warrior monks and the Ikko Ikki leagues remained a major political power in Japan until their defeat at the hands of Oda Nobunaga (1534–1582), who subjugated both the Tendai monks at Mt Hiei and then the Ikko Ikki, in the Ishiyama Honganji War (1570–1580) .

During the mid-sixteenth century westerners first began to arrive in Japan, introducing new technologies, as well as Christianity. This led to numerous debates between Christians and Buddhists, such as the so-called "Yamaguchi sectarian debates" (yamaguchi no shūron).

=== Edo (Tokugawa)-Period (1603–1868) ===
After the Sengoku period of war, Japan was re-united by the Tokugawa Shogunate (1600–1868) who ran the country through a feudal system of regional daimyō. The Tokugawa also banned most foreigners from entering the country. The only western traders to be allowed were the Dutch at the island of Dejima.

During the seventeenth century, the Tokugawa shōgun Iemitsu set into motion a series of reforms which sought to increase state control of religion (as well as to eliminate Christianity). Iemitsu's reforms developed what has been called the head–branch system (hon-matsu seido) and the temple affiliation system (jidan; alt. danka seido). This system made use of already existing Buddhist institutions and affiliations, but attempted to bring them under official government control and required all temples to be affiliated with a government recognized lineage. In general, the Tendai, Pure Land, and Shingon sects were treated more favourably than the True Pure Land and Nichiren sects because the latter had a history of inciting socio-political disturbances in the 16th century.

Buddhist leaders often worked with the government, providing religious support for their rule. For example, the Zen monk Takuan Sōhō (1573–1645) suggested that the spirit of Tokugawa Ieyasu, was a kami (divine spirit). He also wrote a book on zen and martial arts (The Unfettered Mind) addressed to the samurai. Meanwhile, Suzuki Shōsan would even call the Tokugawa shōgun a "holy king" (shōō).

In the Edo period, Buddhist institutions procured funding through various ritual means, such as the sale of talismans, posthumous names and titles, prayer petitions, and medicine. The practice of pilgrimage was also prominent in the Edo Period. Many temples and holy sites like Mt. Kōya, Mt. Konpira and Mt. Ōyama (Sagami Province) hosted Buddhist pilgrims and mountain ascetics throughout the era.

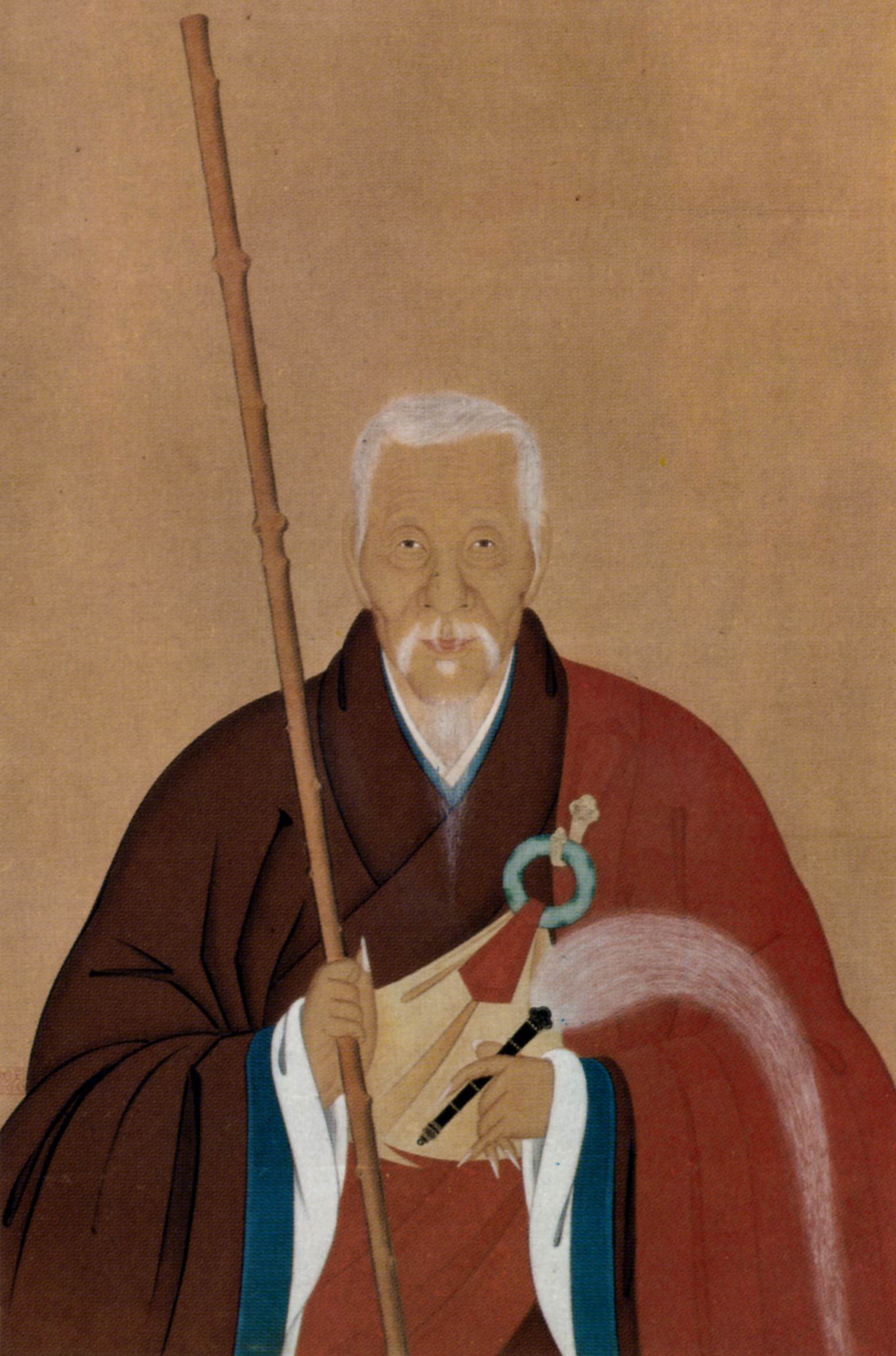
Portrait of Chinese monk Yinyuan (Ingen), who founded the Ōbaku school

During the 17th century, the Ōbaku lineage of Zen would be introduced by Ingen, a Chinese monk. Ingen had been a member of the Linji school in Ming China. This lineage, which promoted the dual practice of zazen and nembutsu, would be very successful, having over a thousand temples by the mid-18th century.

Meanwhile, a new breed of public preachers was beginning to frequent public spaces and develop new forms of preaching. These include Pure Land monk Sakuden (1554–1642), who is seen as an originator of Rakugo humor and wrote the Seisuishō (Laughs to Wake You Up), which is a collection of humorous anecdotes. Other traveling preachers of the era who made use of stories and narratives include the Shingon-Ritsu monk Rentai (1663–1726) and the Pure Land monk Asai Ryōi (d. 1691).

Hakuin Ekaku (1685–1768) laid a strong emphasis on kōan training as the original pedagogical means of his tradition, combining it with a somatic practice by drawing on ideas from Chinese medicine and Daoism. Hakuin also criticized the mixing of Zen and Pure Land. His views became influential in the Meji-period (1868–1912), when his dharma-heirs came to dominate the Japanese Rinzai-school.

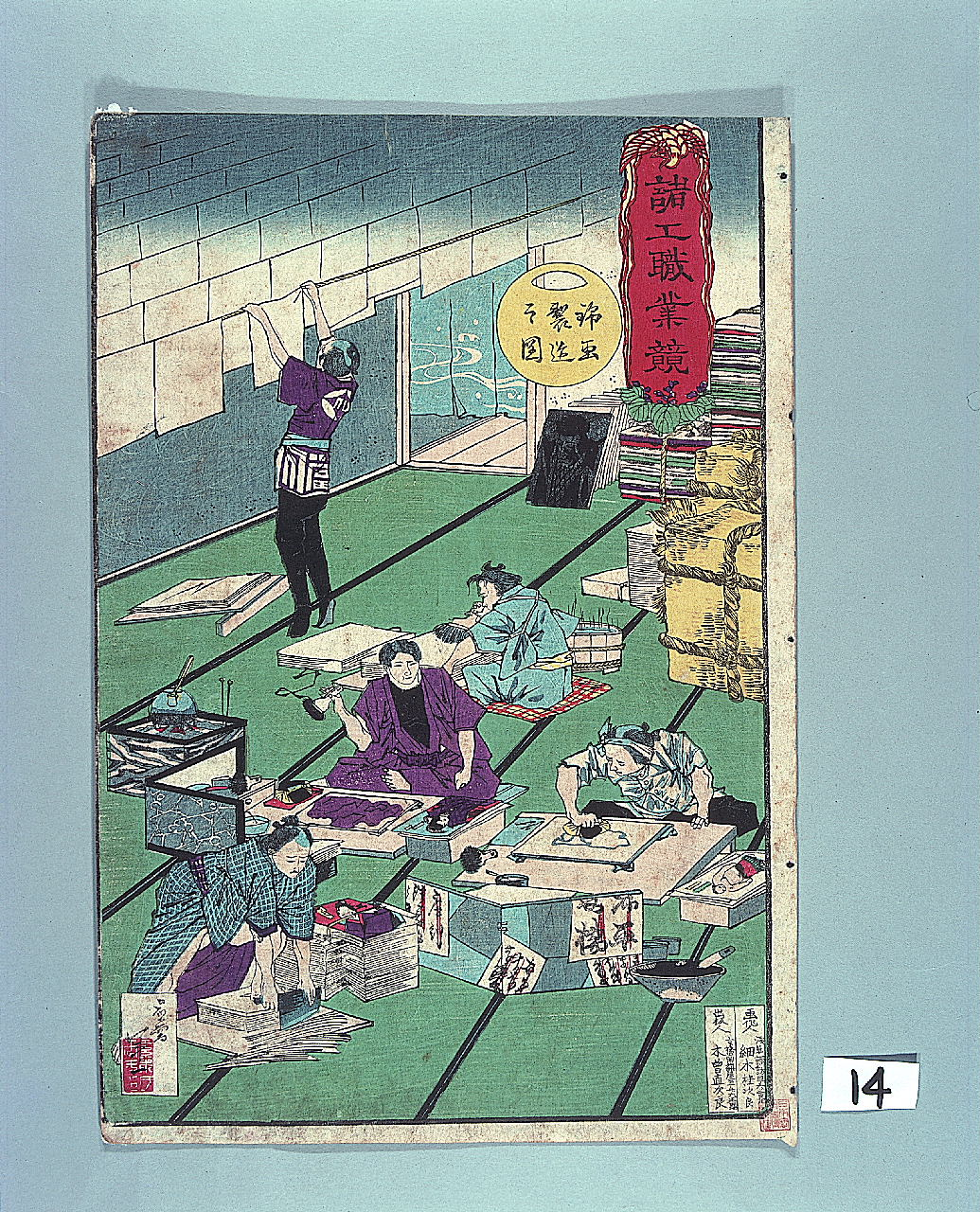
Making Prints, by Hosoki Toshikazu c. 1879

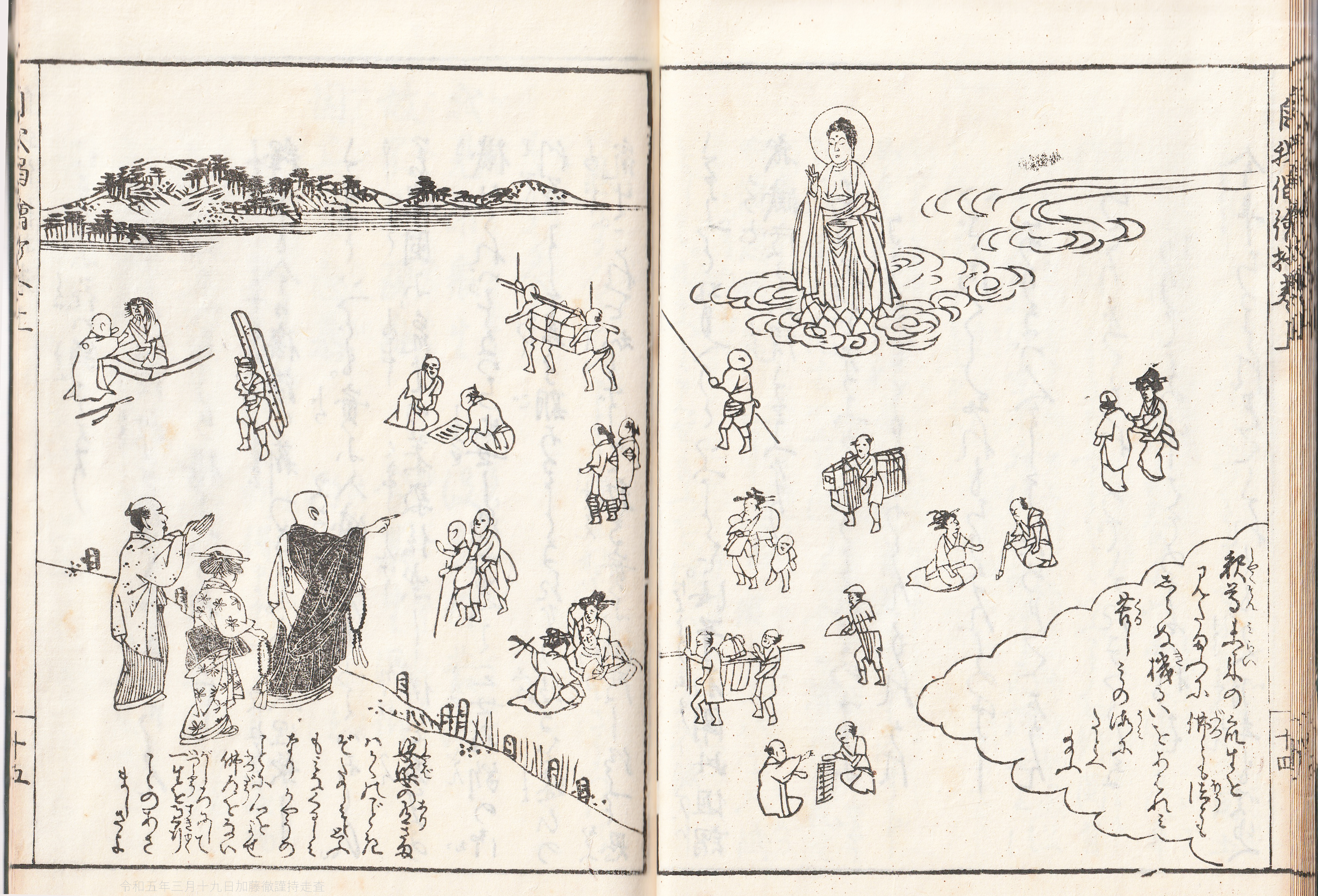
Illustration of a book published in 1814

During the Edo period, there was an unprecedented growth of print publishing (in part due to the support of the Tokugawa regime), and the creation and sale of printed Buddhist works exploded. The Tendai monk Tenkai, supported by Iemitsu, led the printing of the Buddhist "canon" (issaikyō, i.e. The Tripiṭaka). Deal & Ruppert (2015) pp. 184–186 Also notable was the publication of an exceptionally high quality reprint of the Ming-era Tripiṭaka by Tetsugen Doko, a renowned master of the Ōbaku school. An important part of the publishing boom were books of Buddhist sermons called kange-bon or dangi-bon.

With the support of the Shogunate, Buddhist scholasticism also thrived during the Edo period, and the major Buddhist schools established new systems of scholastic study in their schools' seminaries (danrin). Examples include the 18 Jōdo school danrin in Kantō, which were patronized by the Tokugawa family, the most prominent being Zōjōji. The True Pure Land lineages established an extensive seminary system which constituted what would eventually become Ryūkoku University. There was also a renaissance of Sanskrit studies in the Shingon school, led by figures such as Jōgon (1639–1702) and Jiun Sonja (1718–1804). Meanwhile, in Sōtō Zen, scholars led by Menzan Zuihō (1683–1769) undertook a major attempt to publish and study the works of Dōgen.

Also during this time there was a widespread movement among many Buddhist sects to return to the proper use of Buddhist precepts. Numerous figures in the Ōbaku, Shingon, Shingon-risshū, Nichiren, Jōdo shū and Soto schools participated in this effort to tighten and reform Buddhist ethical discipline.

=== Meiji period (1868–1912) ===
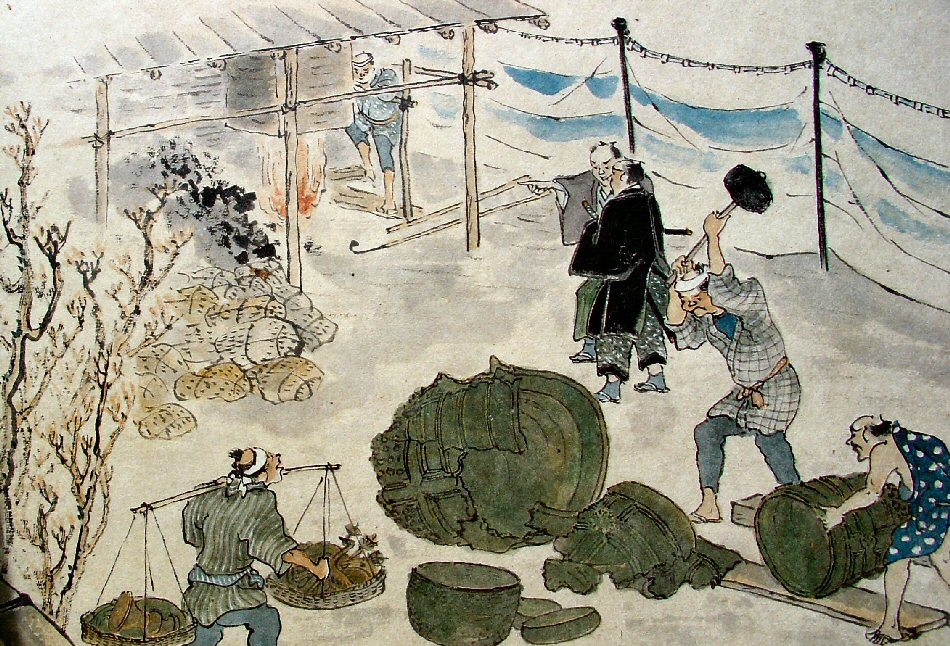
Buddhist temple bells being smelted for bronze during the haibutsu kishaku

After the Meiji Restoration in 1868, the new imperial government adopted a strong anti-Buddhist attitude. A new form of pristine Shinto, shorn of all Buddhist influences, was promoted as the state religion, an official state policy known as shinbutsu bunri (separating Buddhism from Shinto), which began with the Kami and Buddhas Separation Order (shinbutsu hanzenrei) of 1868. The ideologues of this new Shinto sought to return to a pure Japanese spirit, before it was "corrupted" by external influences, mainly Buddhism. They were influenced by national study (kokugaku) figures like Motoori Norinaga (1730–1801) and Hirata Atsutane (1776–1843), both of whom strongly criticized Buddhism. The new order dismantled the combined temple-shrine complexes that had existed for centuries. Buddhists priests were no longer able to practice at Shinto shrines and Buddhist artifacts were removed from Shinto shrines.

This sparked a popular and often violent movement to eradicate Buddhism, which was seen as backwards and foreign and associated with the corrupt Shogunate. There had been much pent-up anger among the populace because the Tokugawa danka system forced families to affiliate themselves with a Buddhist temple, which included the obligation of monetary donations. Many Buddhist temples abused this system to make money, causing an undue burden on their parishioners.

This religious persecution of Buddhism, known as haibutsu kishaku (literally: "abolish Buddhism and destroy Shākyamuni"), saw the destruction and closure of many Buddhist institutions throughout Japan as well as the confiscation of their land, the forced laicization of Buddhist monks and the destruction of Buddhist books and artifacts. In some instances, monks were attacked and killed. The violence spread to every region of the country. Japanologist Martin Collcutt believes Japanese Buddhism was on the verge of total eradication. It is estimated that 40,000 Buddhist temples were destroyed, and in certain places the percentage of Buddhist temples destroyed reached 80%. The intensity of the destruction depended on the region, and the most violent times of haibutsu kishaku lasted between 1869 and 1871.

The government edict of April 1872 ended the status of the Buddhist precepts as state law and allowed monks to marry, to eat meat and stopped the regulation of tonsure and dress. The result of this law (over the course of about four decades) was that most Buddhist priests in Japan marry and many temples became hereditary holdings within a family.

Anti-Buddhist government policies and religious persecution put many Buddhist institutions on the defensive against those who saw it as the enemy of the Japanese people. This led Japanese Buddhist institutions to re-examine and re-invent the role of Buddhism in a modernizing Japanese state which now supported state Shintō. There were a broad range of reform strategies and movements which aimed at positioning Buddhism as a useful partner to a modernizing Japan. This included clerical reform to tighten discipline as well as reforms concerning doctrine and practice. Some Buddhists sought to modernize Buddhist thought by combining it with Western science and philosophy.

This reformed "new Buddhism" (shin bukkyō) was often promoted by laypersons, such as Sakaino Kōyō (1871–1933) and Takashima Beihō (1875–1949) who founded the Shin Bukkyōto Dōshikai (New Buddhist Friends' Association) in 1899 and promoted social justice activities. The New Buddhists often joined Japanese nationalist patriotism with Buddhist virtues. Some new Buddhist organizations fully embraced Japanese nationalism, such as the Kokuchūkai (Pillar of the Nation Society) of Tanaka Chigaku (1861–1939), who promoted Japanese Imperialism as a way to spread the message of the Lotus Sutra. Another new Buddhist society was the Keii-kai (Woof and Warp Society, founded in 1894), which was critical of doctrinal rigidity of traditional Buddhism and championed what they termed "free investigation" (jiyū tōkyū) as a way to respond to the rapid changes of the time.

The era also saw many innovations in Japanese Buddhist thought and philosophy, led by modernist thinkers who have been labeled “doctrinal modernists” (kindai kyōgakusha 近代教学者) by historians. The term refers to numerous influential figures like Shimaji Mokurai (1838–1911), Murakami Senshō (1851–1929), Inoue Enryō (1858–1919), Tanaka Chigaku (1861–1939), Kiyozawa Manshi(1863–1903), Nishida Kitarō (1870–1945), and Suzuki Daisetz (1870–1966).

A major modernist figure in Shin Buddhism was Kiyozawa Manshi, whose Seishin-shugi (Spiritualism) movement promoted the idea that Buddhists should focus on self-cultivation without relying on organized Buddhism or the state. Kiyozawa and his friends lived together in a commune called Kōkōdō (Vast Cavern), and published a journal called Seishinkai (Spiritual World). Other Buddhists focused on adherence to the ten precepts, such as Shaku Unshō who created formed a lay organization known as the Jūzen-kai (Association for the Ten Precepts).

Another influential figure of Buddhist reform during this period was the philosopher Inoue Enryō (1858–1919). A graduate of Tokyo Imperial University, he is known for his critique of Christianity as well as for his ideas on reforming Buddhist institutions. He sought to interpret Buddhist thought through a more rational lens and drew on Western philosophy as well as the teachings of the historical Buddha to do so. He was a prolific author of around 120 books, including Shinri kinshin (The Guiding Principle of Truth) and Bukkyō katsu ron (Enlivening Buddhism). In 1904 he inaugurated the Tetsugaku-dō (Hall of Philosophy), which was dedicated to Shakyamuni, Confucius, Socrates, and Kant. He also advocated for social welfare activities.

It was also during the Meiji era that Japanese Buddhist studies as an academic field began. This was sparked by the overseas travel of Japanese scholars to Western universities and encountered Buddhist textual studies there, particularly the study of Indian Buddhism and its languages (Sanskrit and Pali). This led to some Japanese Buddhists to question the orthodoxy of Japanese Buddhist traditions. However, the Japanese government at this time was hesitant to give Buddhism any significant influence over public education, and as a result Buddhist studies was classed under philosophy rather than religion, and terms such as "Indian studies" was favoured over "Buddhist studies."

One of the first such Japanese academics was Nanjō Bunyū (1849–1927), who studied Sanskrit at Oxford with Max Müller and later took a position at Tokyo Imperial University. Meanwhile, Murakami Senshō (1851–1929) focused on the study of Sanskrit and Pali texts and the history of Buddhism. He focused on the universal values of world Buddhism and wrote critically regarding the historical bias of Japanese Buddhism in works such as Daijō bussetsu ron hihan (A Critique of the Theory that Mahayana Is the Direct Teaching of the Historical Buddha, 1903).

There were also a number of new Buddhist movements that grew popular in the Meiji period through 1945. Some of the most influential of these were the Nichirenist/Lotus movements of Sōka Gakkai, Reiyūkai, and Risshō Kōseikai. They focused on active proselytization and worldly personal benefits.

=== War time Buddhism (1931–1945) ===
During the "fifteen year war" (beginning with the invasion of Manchuria in 1931 and ending with the surrender of Japan in 1945), most Japanese Buddhist institutions supported militarization of Japan.

Japanese Buddhist support for imperialism and militarism was rooted in the Meiji era need for Buddhists to show that they were good citizens that were relevant to Japan's efforts to modernize and become a major power. Some Buddhists, like Tanaka Chigaku, saw the war as a way to spread Buddhism. During the Russo-Japanese War, Buddhist leaders supported the war effort in different ways, such as by providing chaplains to the army, performing rituals to secure victory and working with the families of fallen soldiers. During the fifteen-year war, Japanese Buddhists supported the war effort in similar ways, and Buddhist priests became attached to Imperial army regiments.

The Myōwakai (Society for Light and Peace), a transsectarian Buddhist organization, was a strong supporter of the war effort who promoted the idea of "benevolent forcefulness" which held that "war conducted for a good reason is in accord with the great benevolence and compassion of Buddhism." Another right-wing Buddhist organization during the war was Nisshō Inoue's terrorist organization "League of Blood" (Ketsumeidan), which attempted to carry out a series of assassinations, culminating in the assassination of Prime Minister Inukai Tsuyoshi, an event known as the "May 15 Incident".

During the war, the Japanese government sought to further tighten its control over Buddhist institutions. They attempted to force Buddhist schools to remove from their doctrines any language or idea that revealed anything less than full allegiance to the emperor or that diminished the significance of Shintō kami. This included parts of the writings of medieval Buddhist founders like Shinran and Nichiren who had written that it is sometimes good to criticize rulers if they go against the Dharma.

Buddhists were also forced to venerate talismans from the Ise Shrine, and there were serious consequences for those who refused. For example, during the 1940s, "leaders of both Honmon Hokkeshu and Sōka Gakkai were imprisoned for their defiance of wartime government religious policy, which mandated display of reverence for state Shinto." A few individuals who directly opposed war were targeted by the government. These include the Rinzai priest Ichikawa Hakugen, and Itō Shōshin (1876–1963), a former Jōdo Shinshū priest.

=== Since 1945 ===
At the end of the World War II, Japan was devastated by the allied bombing campaigns, with most cities in ruins. The occupation government abolished state Shinto, establishing freedom of religion and a separation of religion and state which became an official part of the Japanese constitutional amendment in 1947.

This meant that Buddhist temples and institutions were now free to associate with any religious lineage or to become independent if doctrinal or administrative differences proved too much. One example is when Hōryūji temple became independent from the Hossō lineage and created its own Shōtoku denomination.

The Japanese populace was aware of Buddhist involvement in aiding and promoting the war effort. Because of this, Buddhist lineages have engaged in acts of repentance for their wartime activities. Buddhist groups have been active in the post-war peace movement.

Buddhist temples in post-war Japan experienced difficult times. There was much damage to be repaired and there was little funding for it. In the 1950s, the situation slowly improved, especially for those temples that could harness tourism and other ways of procuring funding. However, post-war land reforms and an increasingly mobile and urban population meant that temples lost both parishioners and land holdings.

In the 1960s, many temples were focused solely on providing services like funerals and burials. In 1963, Tamamuro Taijō coined the term sōshiki bukkyō (funerary Buddhism), to describe the ritualistic formalism of temple Buddhism in postwar Japan that was often divorced from people's spiritual needs. Post-war Japan has seen a decline in traditional temple Buddhism, with roughly 100 Buddhist organizations disappearing every year. Still, around 90% of Japanese funerals are conducted according to Buddhist rites.

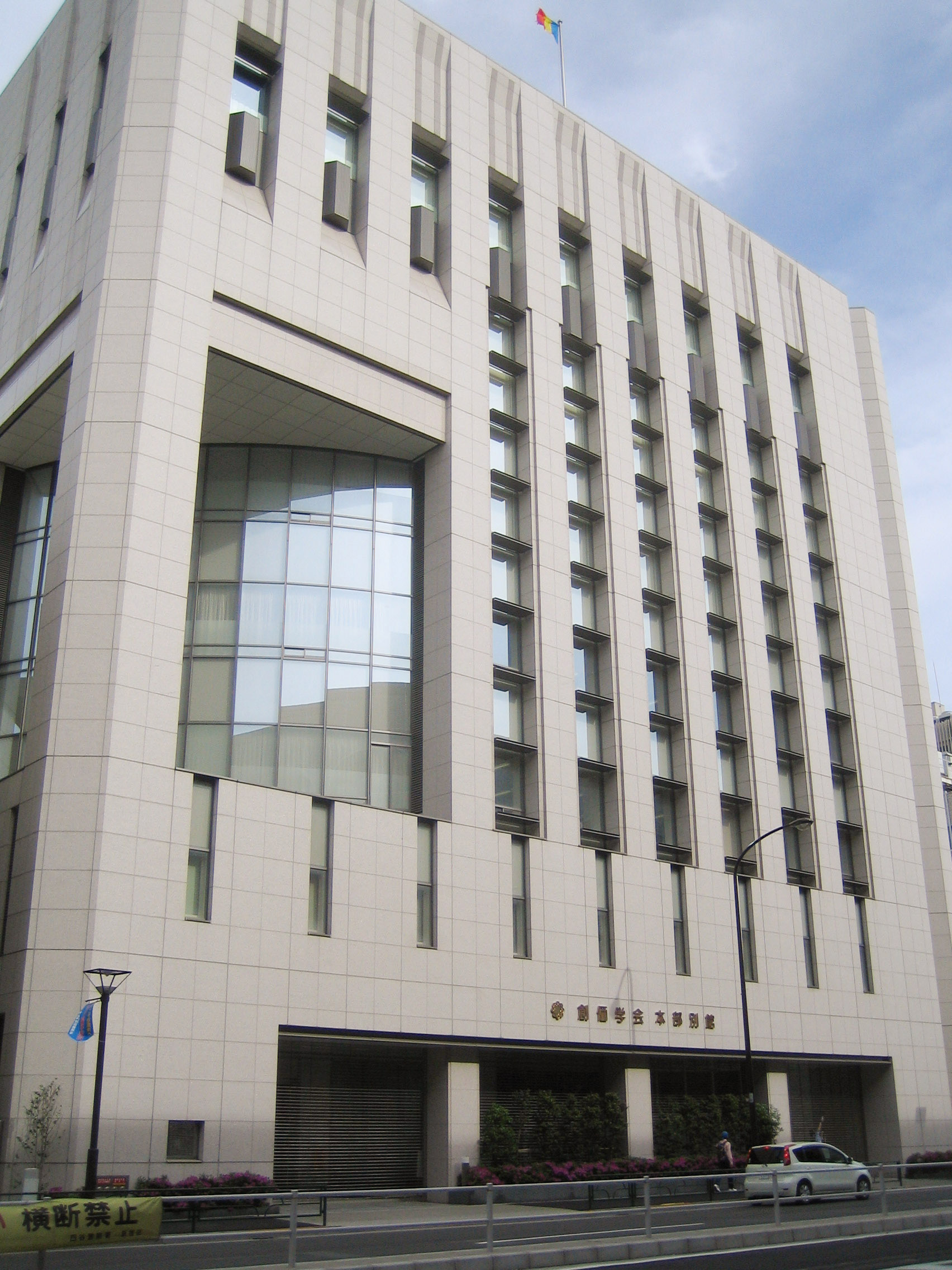
Soka Gakkai's Tokyo headquarters

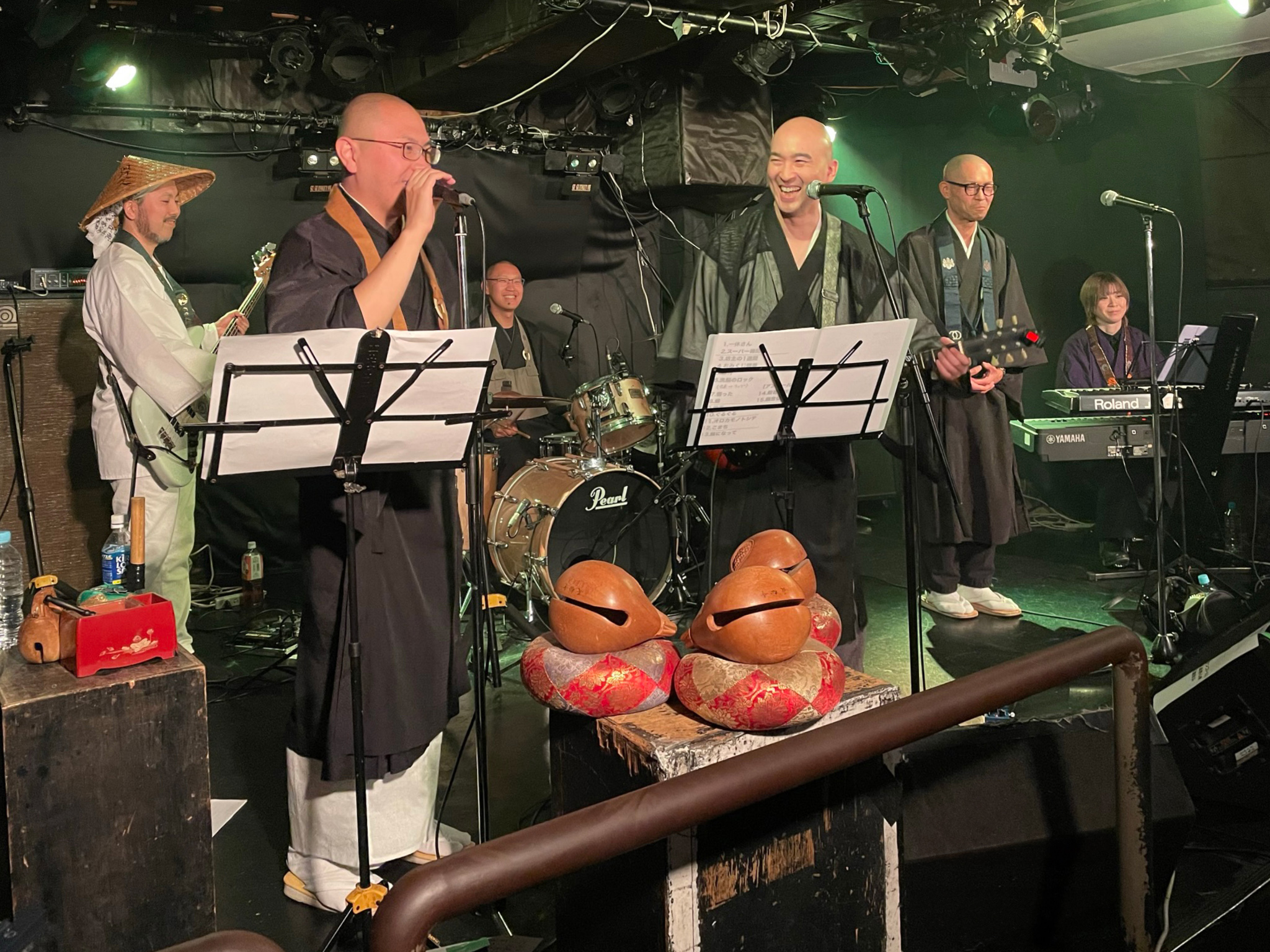
Vowz Band (A group of Buddhist monks who use rock music to spread message)

During the post-war period, in contrast to traditional temple Buddhism, Buddhist based Japanese new religions grew rapidly, especially the Nichiren/Lotus Sūtra based movements like Sōka Gakkai and Risshō Kōseikai (which are today the largest lay Buddhist organizations in Japan). Soka Gakkai "... grew rapidly in the chaos of post war Japan from about 3000 members in 1951 to over 8 million members" in 2000, and has established schools, colleges and a university, as well as cultural institutions.

A study about the reason for the growth in lay believers and increased engagement in society attributes the cause to Nichiren teachings of 'social responsibility': "In the tradition of Nichiren Buddhism, however, we find the Lotus Sutra linked to a view of social responsibility that is distinctive". According to an academic study, lay believers of Buddhism "... offer an alternative view of Japan where their form of Buddhism would form the religious foundation of a peaceful and psychologically and materially enriched society".

In the 1970s, during a period of rapid social and economic change, there was a wave of new religious movements that were called "new new religions" (shin shin shūkyō). While the new religions tended to be Nichiren focused, the "new new" Buddhist religions tend to be influenced by numerous other Buddhist traditions. Buddhist new new religions include the Agon shū (Āgama School), Gedatsukai (Enlightenment Society, drawing from Shingon and Shinto), and Shinnyoen (Garden of True Thusness, a Shingon-based religion). Aum Shinrikyō, the most notorious of these new new religions, is a dangerous cult responsible for the Tokyo gas attack.

The post-war era also saw a new philosophical movements among Buddhist intellectuals called the Kyoto school, since it was led by a group of Kyoto University professors, mainly Nishida Kitarō (1870–1945), Tanabe Hajime (1885–1962), and Nishitani Keiji (1900–1991). These thinkers drew from Western philosophers like Kant, Hegel and Nietzsche and Buddhist thought to express a new perspective. Another intellectual field that has attracted interest is Critical Buddhism (hihan bukkyō), associated with Sōtō Zen priests like Hakamaya Noriaki (b. 1943) and Matsumoto Shirō (b. 1950), who criticized certain key ideas in Japanese Mahayana (mainly Buddha nature and original enlightenment) as being incompatible with the Buddha's not-self doctrine. Critical Buddhists have also examined the moral failings of Japanese Buddhism, such as support for nationalist violence and social discrimination.

== Schools ==
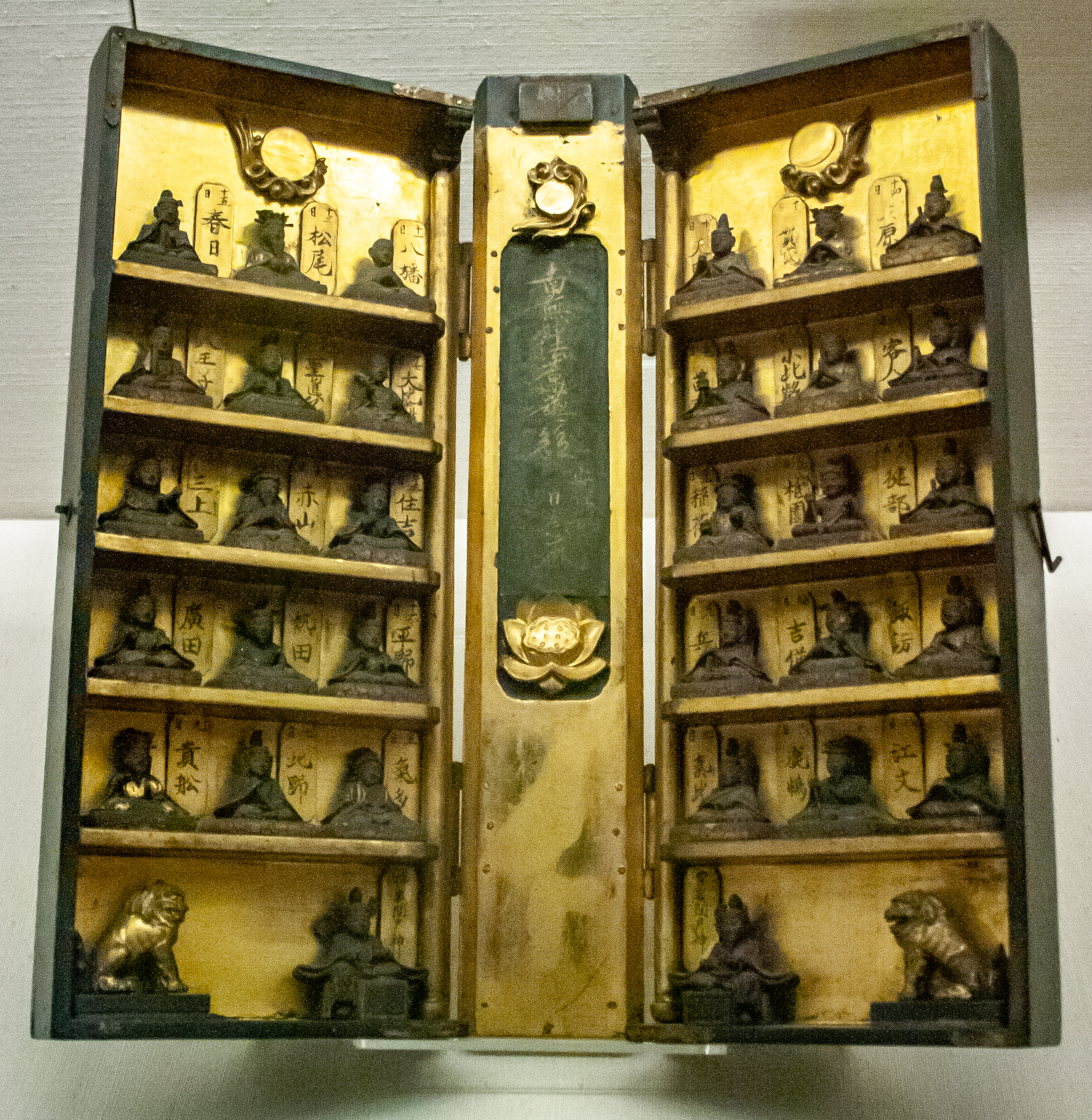
Portable shrine from the 1600s with 30 guardian deities and an invocation to the Lotus Sutra. Buddhism and kami worship were closely associated in Japan until they were separated in the late 1800s.

Japanese Buddhism is very diverse with numerous independent schools and temple lineages (including the "old" Nara schools and the "new" Kamakura schools) that can be traced back to ancient and medieval Japan, as well as more recent Japanese New Religious movements and modern lay organizations.

According to the religious statistics of 2023 by the Agency for Cultural Affairs of Japan, the religious corporation under the jurisdiction of the Ministry of Education, Culture, Sports, Science and Technology in Japan had 129 million believers, of which 46 million were Buddhists and most of them were believers of new schools of Buddhism which were established in the Kamakura period (1185－1333). The number of believers of each sect is approximately 22 million for Pure Land Buddhism, 10 million for Nichiren Buddhism, 5.4 million for Shingon Buddhism, 5.2 million for Zen Buddhism, 2.8 million for Tendai Buddhism, and only about 700,000 for the old schools, which were established in the Nara period (710－794).

An old saying regarding the schools of Buddhism in relation to the different classes is:

The Tendai is for the royal family, the Shingon for the nobility, the Zen for the warrior classes, and the Jodo for the masses.

=== Nara Buddhism ===
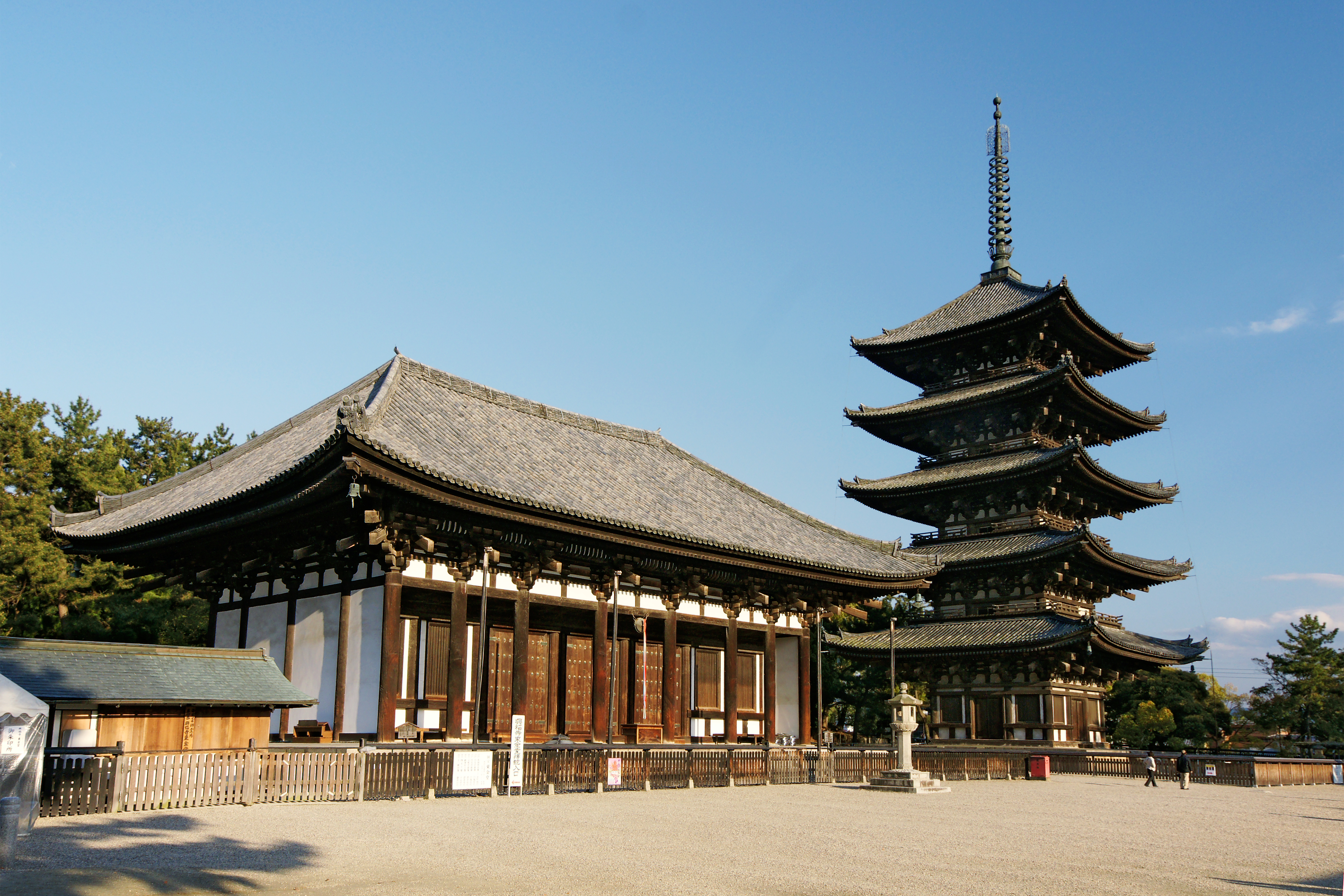
Kōfuku-ji, the national headquarters of the Hossō school

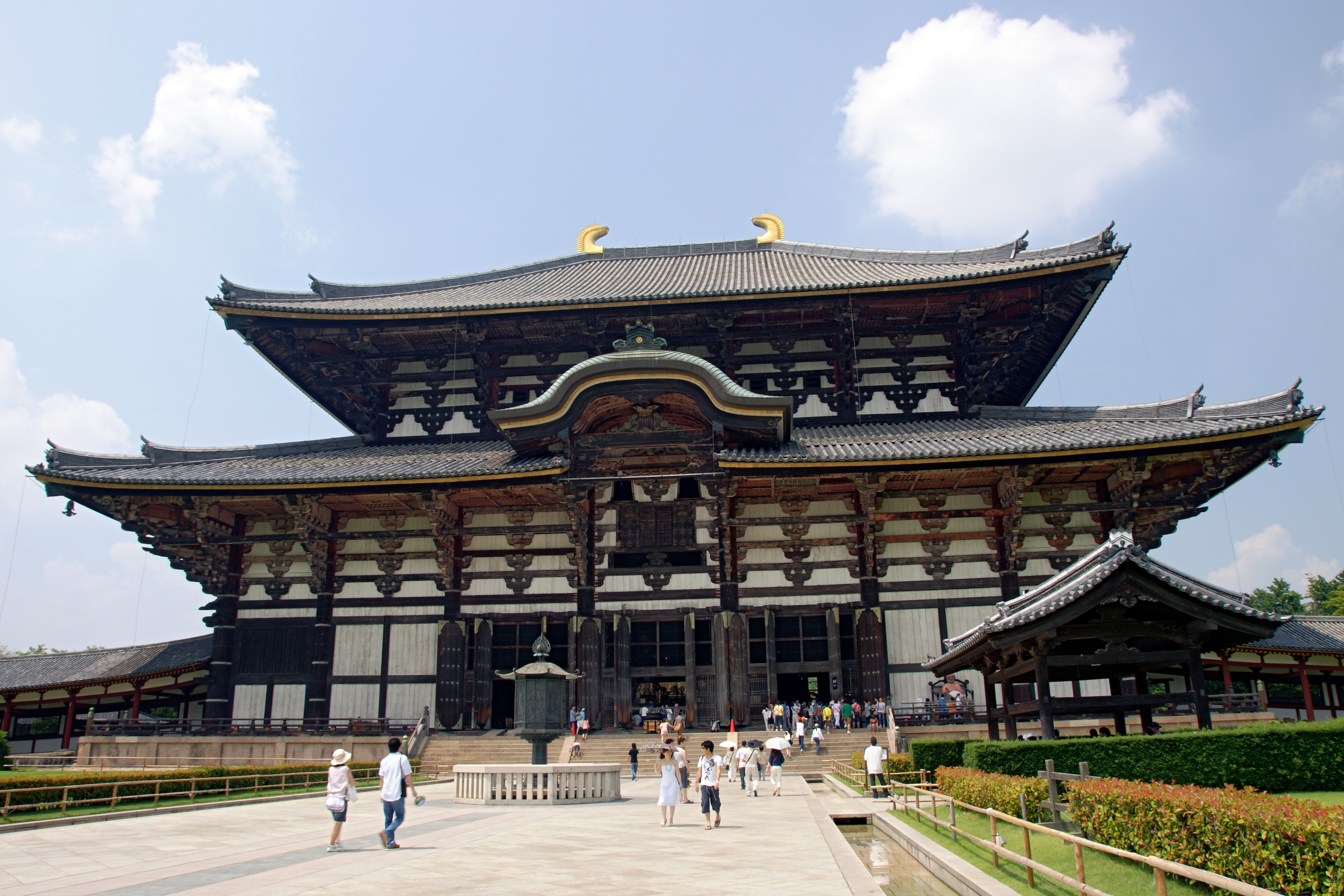
Tōdai-ji, the head temple of the Kegon school

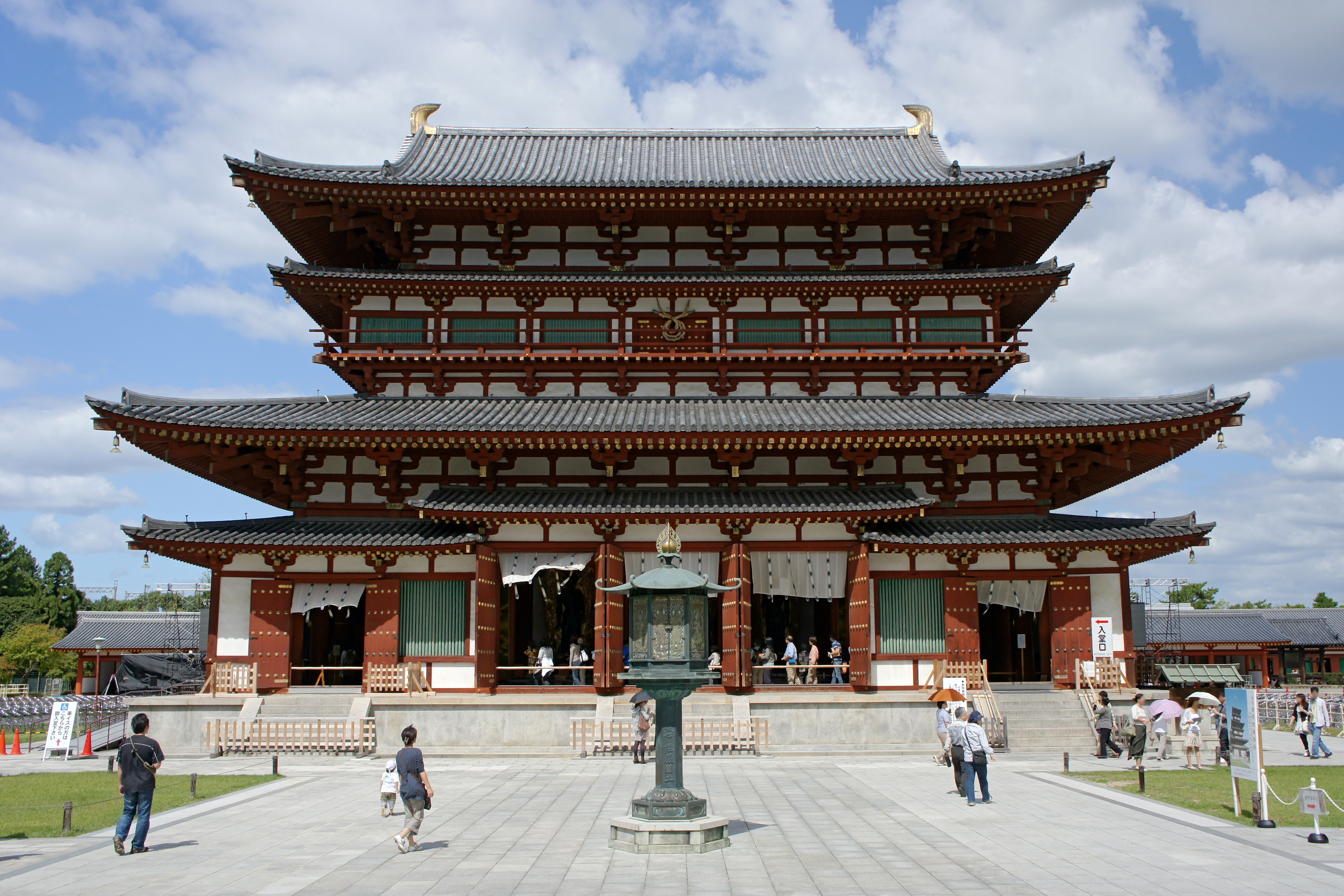
The Golden Hall (kondō) at Yakushi-ji

The Six Nara Schools are the oldest Buddhist schools in Japan. These schools came to Japan from Korea and China during the late 6th and early 7th centuries. They are associated with the ancient capital of Heijō-kyō (present-day Nara), where they founded the famed "seven great temples of the southern capital" (Nanto Shichi Daiji 南都七大寺).

- Kegon Buddhism (華厳宗, Kegon-shū), introduced to Japan around 736 by the Indian monk Bodhisena. The school focused on the Avatamsaka Sutra, a compilation of numerous sutras, as well as on the works of Huayan patriarchs on the interpenetration of all phenomena (or "dharmas" in the specifically Buddhist sense).
- Hossō Buddhism (法相宗, Hossō-shū), introduced to Japan in 654 by Japanese monk Dōshō, who had travelled to China to study under Xuanzang. The school focused on the Yogācāra philosophy of Asanga and Vasubandhu on mastering the consciousness and mind.
- Sanron Buddhism (三論宗, Sanron-shū), introduced to Japan around 625 by the Goguryeo monk Hyegwan. The school focused on the Mādhyamaka philosophy of Nāgārjuna and Āryadeva on the emptiness of all phenomenon.
- Risshū Buddhism (律宗, Risshū-shū), introduced to Japan around 753 by the Chinese monk Jianzhen. The school focused on the Dharmaguptaka translation of the Vinaya and on strict adherece to Pratimokṣa monastic rules.
- Jōjitsu Buddhism (成実宗, Jōjitsu-shū), introduced to Japan around 625 by the Goguryeo monk Ekwan. The school focused on the Satyasiddhi-Śāstra, a text of Abhidharma by the philosopher Harivarman. It was never a truly independent school, instead it was studied along with Sanron doctrine.
- Kusha Buddhism (倶舎宗, Kusha-shū), a Sarvāstivāda school focused on the Abhidharmakośabhaṣya, a text of Abhidharma by the philosopher Vasubandhu. It was never a truly independent school, instead it was studied along with Hossō doctrine.

=== Heian Buddhism ===
Eventually, the increasing power of Six Nara Schools and their influence in politics started to overwhelm the city of Nara. This forced Emperor Kanmu to relocate the capital, moving it to Heian-kyō (present-day Kyoto). It also directly encouraged the creation of the Tendai school, founded by Saichō, and the Shingon school, founded by Kūkai.

- Tendai Buddhism (天台宗, Tendai-shū) is a branch of the Tiantai Buddhism introduced to Japan by Saichō in 805, who also introduced tantric elements into the tradition. The primary text of Tendai Buddhism is the Lotus Sutra, but the Nirvana Sutra and esoteric works like the Mahavairocana Sutra (大日経, Dainichikyō) and Vajrasekhara Sutra (金剛頂経, Kongōchōkyō) are also important. The Lotus Sutra is also central to Tendai esoteric teachings.
- Shingon Buddhism (真言宗, Shingon-shū) is a branch of the Vajrayana Buddhism introduced to Japan by Kūkai in 816, who traveled to China and studied the Chinese Mantrayana tradition. Shingon is based mainly on two tantric scriptures, the Mahavairocana Sutra and the Vajrasekhara Sutra. Dainichi Nyorai is central to Shingon esoteric teachings.

Additionally, this period saw the development of Shugendō, an eclectic tradition which brought together Buddhist and ancient Shinto elements. It was founded by En no Gyōja (役行者, "En the ascetic").

=== Kamakura Buddhism ===
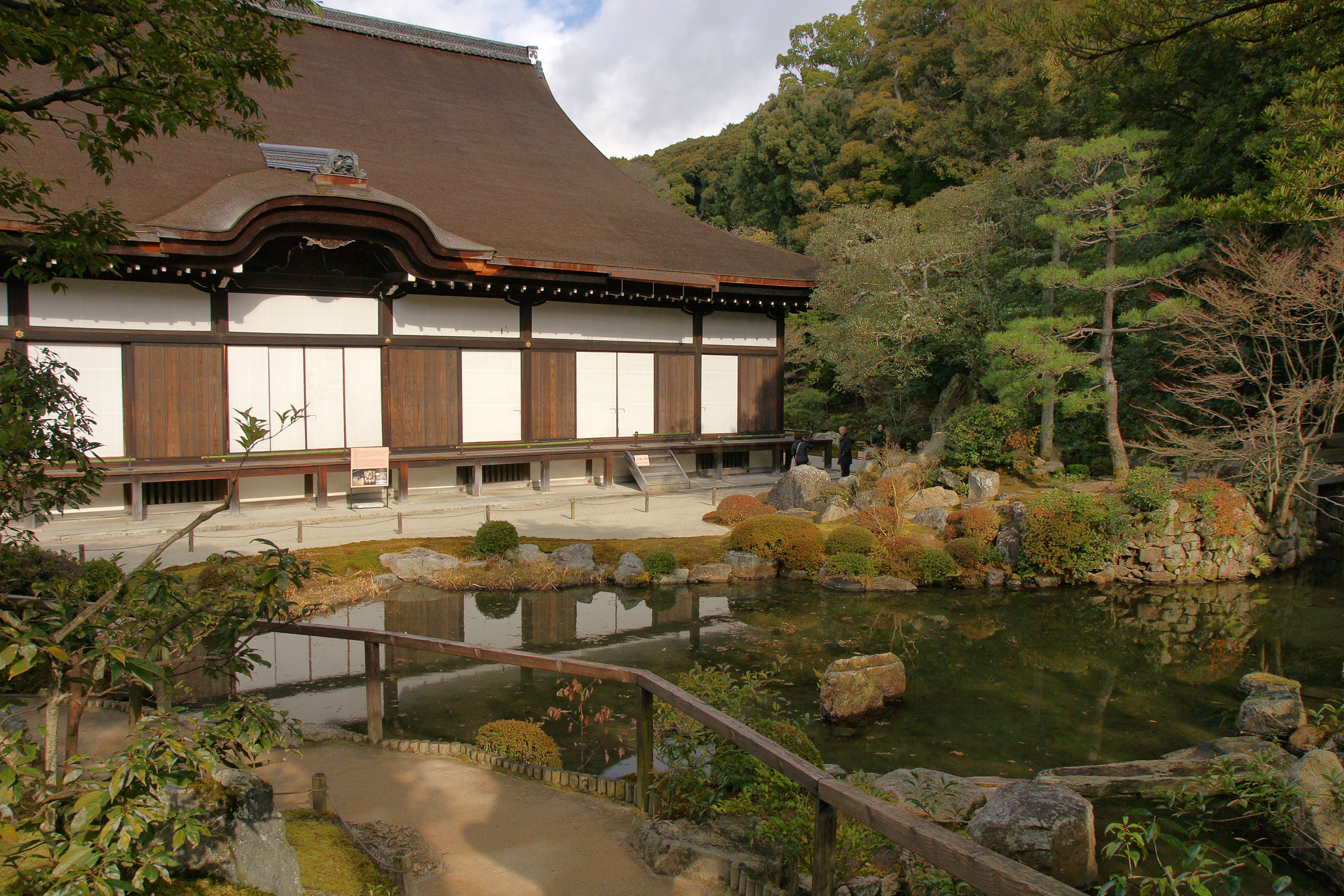
Chion-in, the head temple of Jōdo-shū.

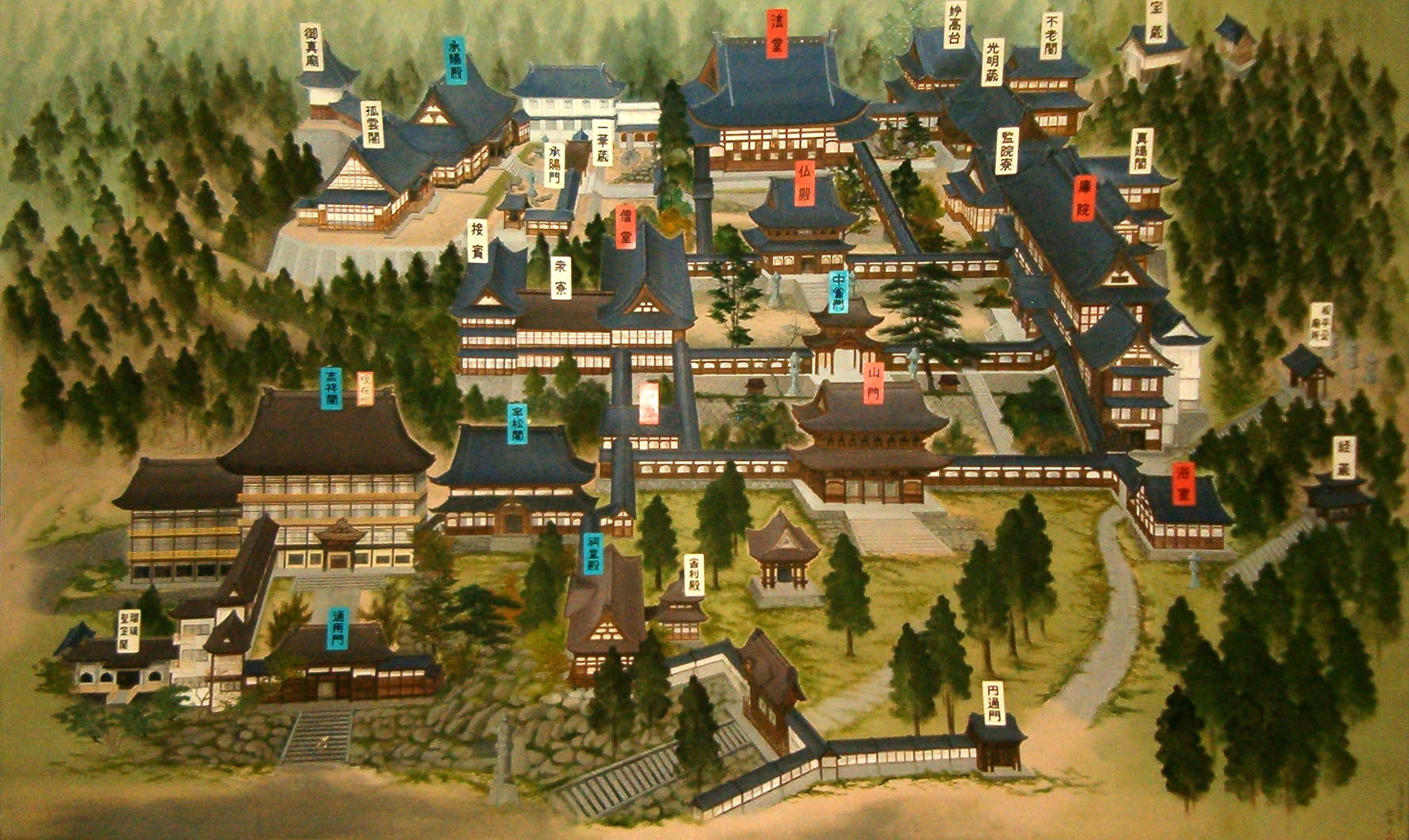
A traditional map of Eihei-ji, the main temple of the Sōtō school.

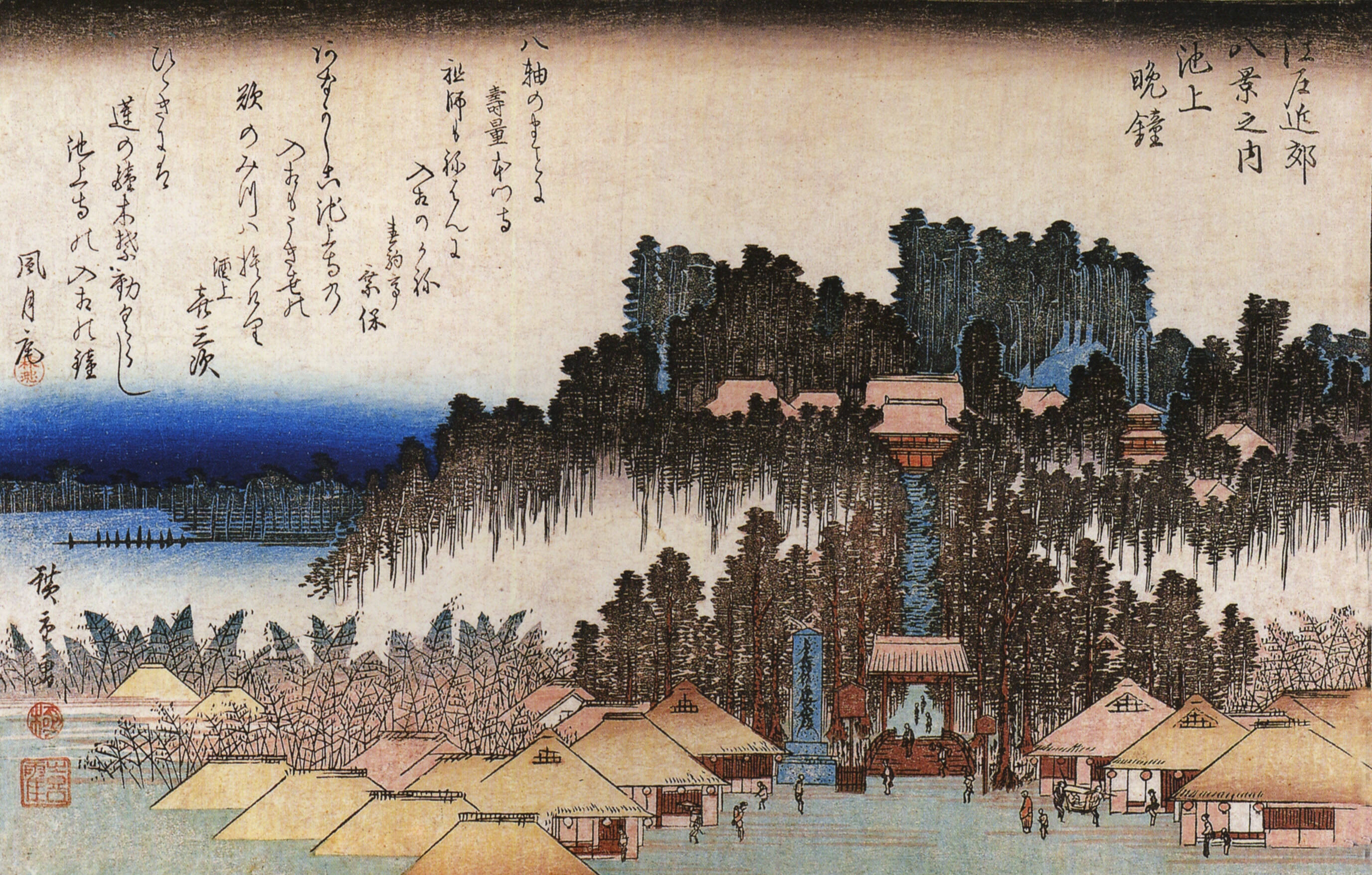
A print of the Nichiren Shū temple Ikegami Honmon-ji by Hiroshige.

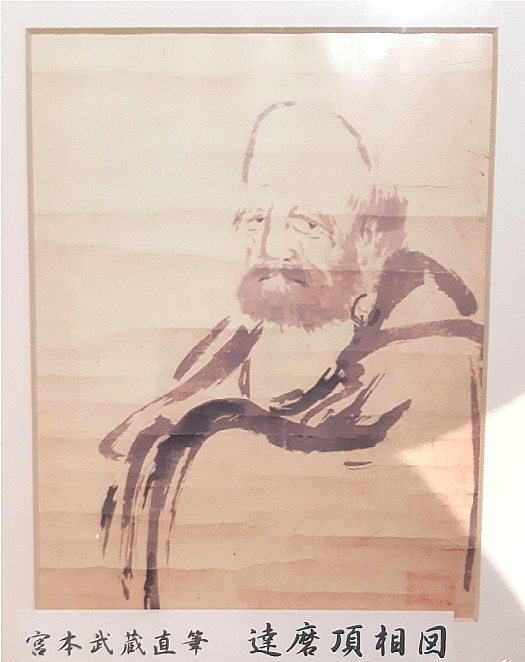
Bodhidharma (Chinese: 達磨; Hiragana: だるま; Rōmaji: Daruma), painted by Miyamoto Musashi, swordsman artist and philosopher close to Takuan Soho monk of the Rinzai school (linked to the samurai caste) founded by the 28th Patriarch.

During the Kamakura period, many Buddhist schools (classified by scholars as "New Buddhism" or Shin Bukkyo), as opposed to "Old Buddhism" (Kyū Bukkyō).

- Pure Land Buddhism, which focuses on Nembutsu practice, chanting the name of Amida Buddha, so as to be reborn in the Pure Land.
  - The Jōdo-shū founded by Hōnen (1133–1212).
  - The Jōdo Shinshū founded by Shinran (1173–1263).
  - The Ji-shū founded by Ippen (1239–1289).
  - The Yūzū-Nembutsu-shū founded by Ryōnin (1072–1132).
- Zen Buddhism, originating from Chinese Chan Buddhism, focuses on Zazen meditation.
  - The Rinzai Zen founded by Eisai (1141–1215), a Japanese line of the Chinese Linji school, emphasizes Kōan practice.
  - The Sōtō Zen founded by Dōgen (1200–1253), a Japanese line of the Chinese Caodong school, emphasizes Shikantaza practice.
  - The Ōbaku Zen introduced by Ingen in 1654, incorporates elements of Nembutsu practice.
- Nichiren Buddhism, founded by Nichiren (1222–1282) which focuses on the Lotus Sutra and Odaimoku practice, chanting the name of the Lotus Sutra.
  - The Nichiren-shū, venerates and reveres the Shakyamuni Buddha of the Essential Teachings.
  - The Nichiren Shōshū, venerates and reveres the Dai Gohonzon of the High Sanctuary of the Essential Teachings.

=== New religious movements ===
There are various Japanese new religious movements which can be considered Buddhist sects, the largest of these are lay Nichiren Buddhist groups such as Soka Gakkai, Reiyūkai, Risshō Kōsei-kai and lay Zen Buddhist groups such as Sanbo Kyodan and FAS Society. But there are other new movements such as Agon Shū (阿含宗, "Agama School"), a Buddhist school which focuses on studying the Agamas, a collection of early Buddhist scriptures.

== Cultural influence ==
=== Societal influence ===
During the Kamakura (1185–1333) and Muromachi (1336–1573) periods, Buddhism and Buddhist institutions had a great influence on Japanese society. Buddhist institutions were used by the shogunate to control the country. During the Edo (1600–1868) this power was constricted, to be followed by persecutions at the beginning of the Meiji era (1868–1912). Buddhist temples played a major administrative role during the Edo period, through the Danka or terauke system. In this, Japanese citizens were required to register at their local Buddhist temples and obtain a certification (terauke), which became necessary to function in society. At first, this system was put into place to suppress Christianity, but over time it took on the larger role of census and population control.

=== Artistic influence ===
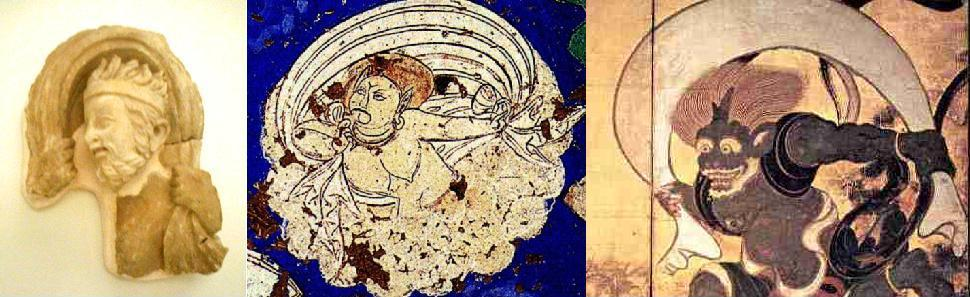
Iconographical evolution of the Wind God. Left: Greek wind god from Hadda, Afghanistan, 2nd century. Middle: wind god from Kizil Caves, Tarim Basin, 7th century. Right: Japanese wind god Fūjin, 17th century.

Japanese Buddhist art started to develop as soon as the country converted to Buddhism in 548. Some tiles from the Asuka period (shown above), the first period following the conversion of the country to Buddhism, display a strikingly classical style, with ample Hellenistic dress and realistically rendered body shape characteristic of Greco-Buddhist art.

Buddhist art became extremely varied in its expression. Many elements of Greco-Buddhist art remain to this day however, such as the Hercules inspiration behind the Nio guardian deities in front of Japanese Buddhist temples, or representations of the Buddha reminiscent of Greek art such as the Buddha in Kamakura. (Note: Katsumi Tanabe: "Needless to say, the influence of Greek art on Japanese Buddhist art, via the Buddhist art of Gandhara and India, was already partly known in, for example, the comparison of the wavy drapery of the Buddha images, in what was, originally, a typical Greek style" (Katsumi Tanabe, "Alexander the Great, East-West cultural contacts from Greece to Japan", p. 19))

==== Deities ====
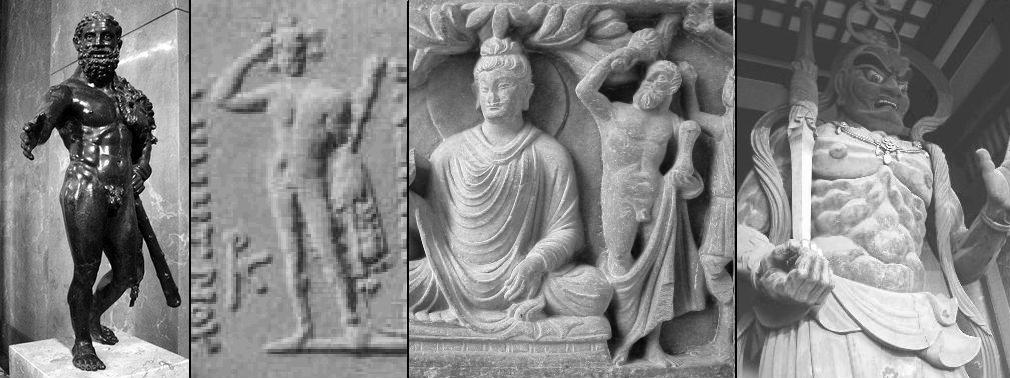
Iconographical evolution from the Greek god Heracles to the Japanese god Shukongōshin. From left to right: 1) Heracles (Louvre Museum). 2) Heracles on coin of Greco-Bactrian king Demetrius I. 3) Vajrapani, the protector of the Buddha, depicted as Heracles in the Greco-Buddhist art of Gandhara. 4) Shukongōshin, manifestation of Vajrapani, as protector deity of Buddhist temples in Japan.

Various other Greco-Buddhist artistic influences can be found in the Japanese Buddhist pantheon, the most striking being that of the Japanese wind god Fūjin. In consistency with Greek iconography for the wind god Boreas, the Japanese wind god holds above his head with his two hands a draping or "wind bag" in the same general attitude. (Note: Katusmi Tanabe: "The Japanese wind god images do not belong to a separate tradition apart from that of their Western counter-parts but share the same origins. (...) One of the characteristics of these Far Eastern wind god images is the wind bag held by this god with both hands, the origin of which can be traced back to the shawl or mantle worn by Boreas/Oado." (Katsumi Tanabe, "Alexander the Great, East-West cultural contacts from Greece to Japan", p. 21)) The abundance of hair has been kept in the Japanese rendering, as well as exaggerated facial features.

Another Buddhist deity, Shukongōshin, one of the wrath-filled protector deities of Buddhist temples in Japan, is also an interesting case of transmission of the image of the famous Greek god Heracles to East Asia along the Silk Road. Heracles was used in Greco-Buddhist art to represent Vajrapani, the protector of the Buddha, and his representation was then used in China and Japan to depict the protector gods of Buddhist temples. (Note: Katsumi Tanabe: "The origin of the image of Vajrapani should be explained. This deity is the protector and guide of the Buddha Sakyamuni. His image was modelled after that of Hercules. (...) The Gandharan Vajrapani was transformed in Central Asia and China and afterwards transmitted to Japan, where it exerted stylistic influences on the wrestler-like statues of the Guardian Deities (Nio)." (Katsumi Tanabe, "Alexander the Great, East-West cultural contacts from Greece to Japan", p. 23))

==== Artistic motifs ====
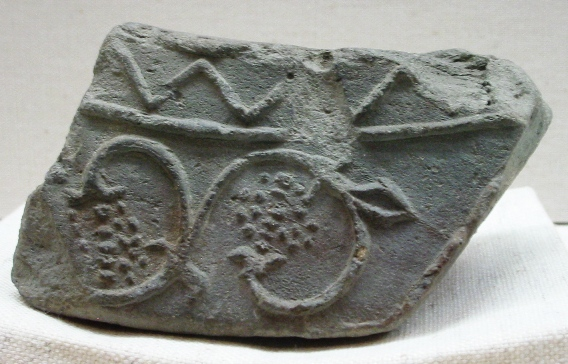
Vine and grape scrolls from Nara, 7th century.

The artistic inspiration from Greek floral scrolls is found quite literally in the decoration of Japanese roof tiles, one of the only remaining element of wooden architecture throughout centuries. The clearest ones are from the 7th century Nara temple building tiles, some of them exactly depicting vines and grapes. These motifs have evolved towards more symbolic representations, but essentially remain to this day in many Japanese traditional buildings. (Note: The transmission of the floral scroll pattern from West to East is presented in the regular exhibition of Ancient Japanese Art, at the Tokyo National Museum.)

=== Architecture and temples ===
Soga no Umako built Hōkō-ji, the first temple in Japan, between 588 and 596. It was later renamed as Asuka-dera for Asuka, the name of the capital where it was located. Unlike early Shinto shrines, early Buddhist temples were highly ornamental and strictly symmetrical. The early Heian period (9th–10th century) saw an evolution of style based on the mikkyō sects Tendai and Shingon Buddhism. The Daibutsuyō style and the Zenshūyō style emerged in the late 12th or early 13th century.

== Holidays ==
The following Japanese Buddhist holidays are celebrated by most, if not all, major Buddhist traditions:

- Jan. 1st – Japanese New Year (Shōgatsu).
- Feb. 15th – Nirvana Day (Nehan-e). The day at the Buddha was said to have died into Parinirvana (his final vanishing).
- Mar. 20th – Higan-e, the Spring Equinox celebration.
- Apr. 8th – Buddha's Birthday (Hanamatsuri), i.e. Kanbutsu-e (潅仏会) or Busshō-e (仏生会).
- July – Aug. – Obon Festival, a festival to honor the spirits of one's ancestors.
- Sept. 21st, approximately – Higan-e, the Autumnal Equinox celebration.
- Dec. 8th – Bodhi Day (Shaka-Jōdō-e or just Jōdō-e), this celebrated the awakening of the Buddha.
- Dec. 31st – Jōya-e or Sechibun-e, the end of the year celebration.

Some holidays are specific to certain schools or traditions. For example, Zen Buddhist traditions celebrate Daruma-ki on October 15 to commemorate the life of Bodhidharma.

== Demographics ==
According to statistics by the Agency for Cultural Affairs in 2023, the religious corporation under the jurisdiction of the Ministry of Education, Culture, Sports, Science and Technology in Japan had 129 million believers, of which 46 million were Buddhists. Most of them were believers of new schools of Buddhism which were established in the Kamakura period (1185－1333). According to these statistics, the largest sects of Japanese Buddhism are the Jōdo Buddhists with 22 million believers, followed by the Nichiren Buddhists with 10 million believers.

There are a wide range of estimates; the Pew Research Center estimated 36.2% of the population in 2010 practiced Buddhism. The Japanese General Social Survey placed the figure at less than 20% of the population in 2017. The 2013 Japanese National Character Survey showed that roughly 70% of the population do not adhere to any religious beliefs. Another survey indicates that about 60% of Japanese families have a butsudan (Buddhist shrine) in their homes. According to a 2012 Pew Research study, Japan has the third largest Buddhist population in the world, after China and Thailand.

== See also ==
- Buddhist deities
- Buddhist modernism
- Buddhist philosophy
- Greater India
- History of Buddhism
- Ichibata Yakushi Kyodan
- Kanjin
- Nara National Museum
- Religion in Japan
- Shinbutsu kakuri
