= Museum of the Imperial Collections =

- 三の丸尚蔵館
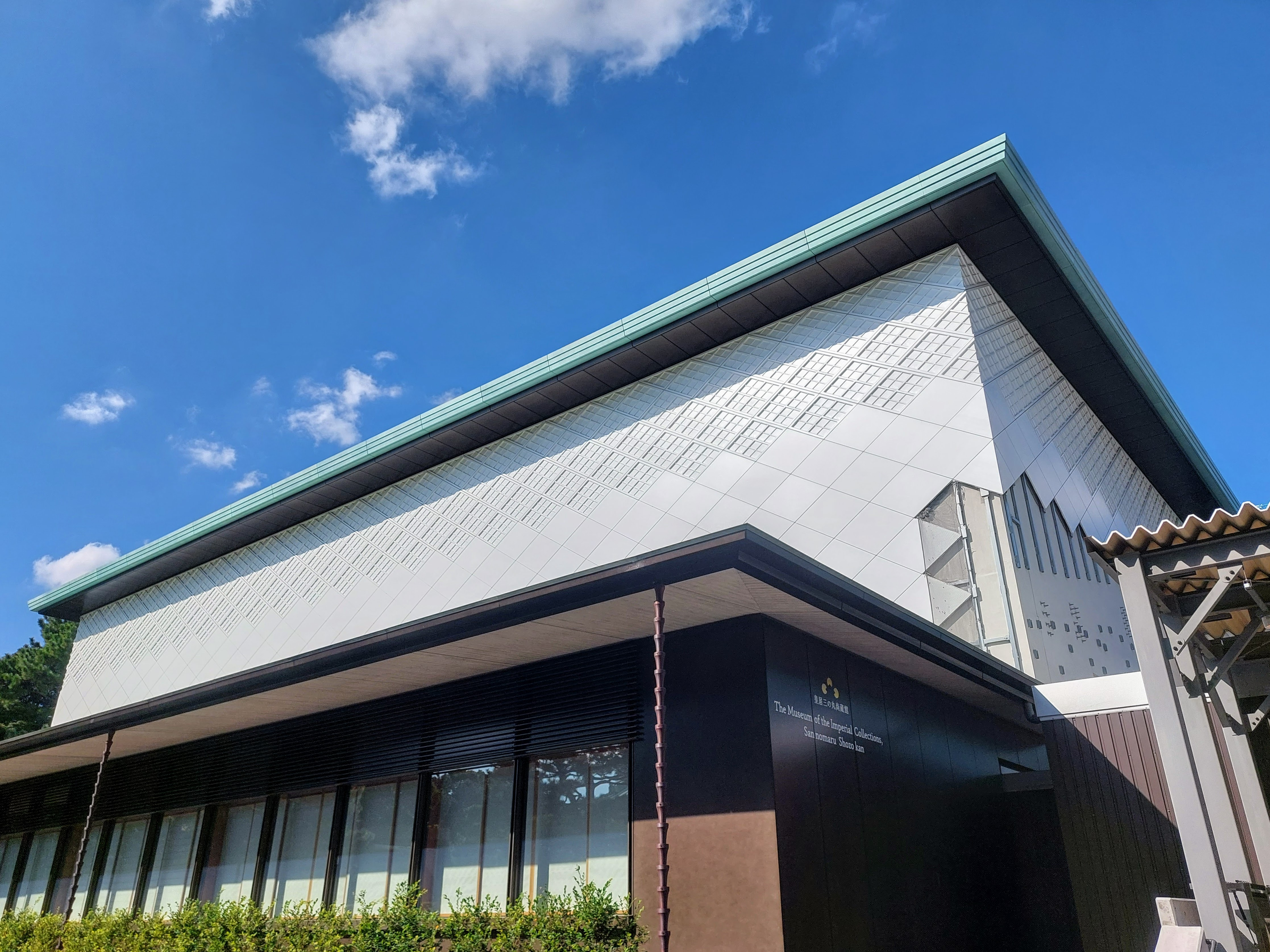

- Location of Museum of the Imperial Collections in Japan Museum of the Imperial Collections (Tokyo wards area)
- Established: 1993
- Location: 1-1 Chioyoda, Chiyoda-ku, Tokyo, Japan 100-0001
- Coordinates: 35.686302°N 139.759247°E
- Type: Art museum
- Collection size: ca. 9,500 pieces
- Owner: National Institutes for Cultural Heritage
- Public transit access: Ōtemachi Station (Tokyo), Tokyo Metro Toei Subway

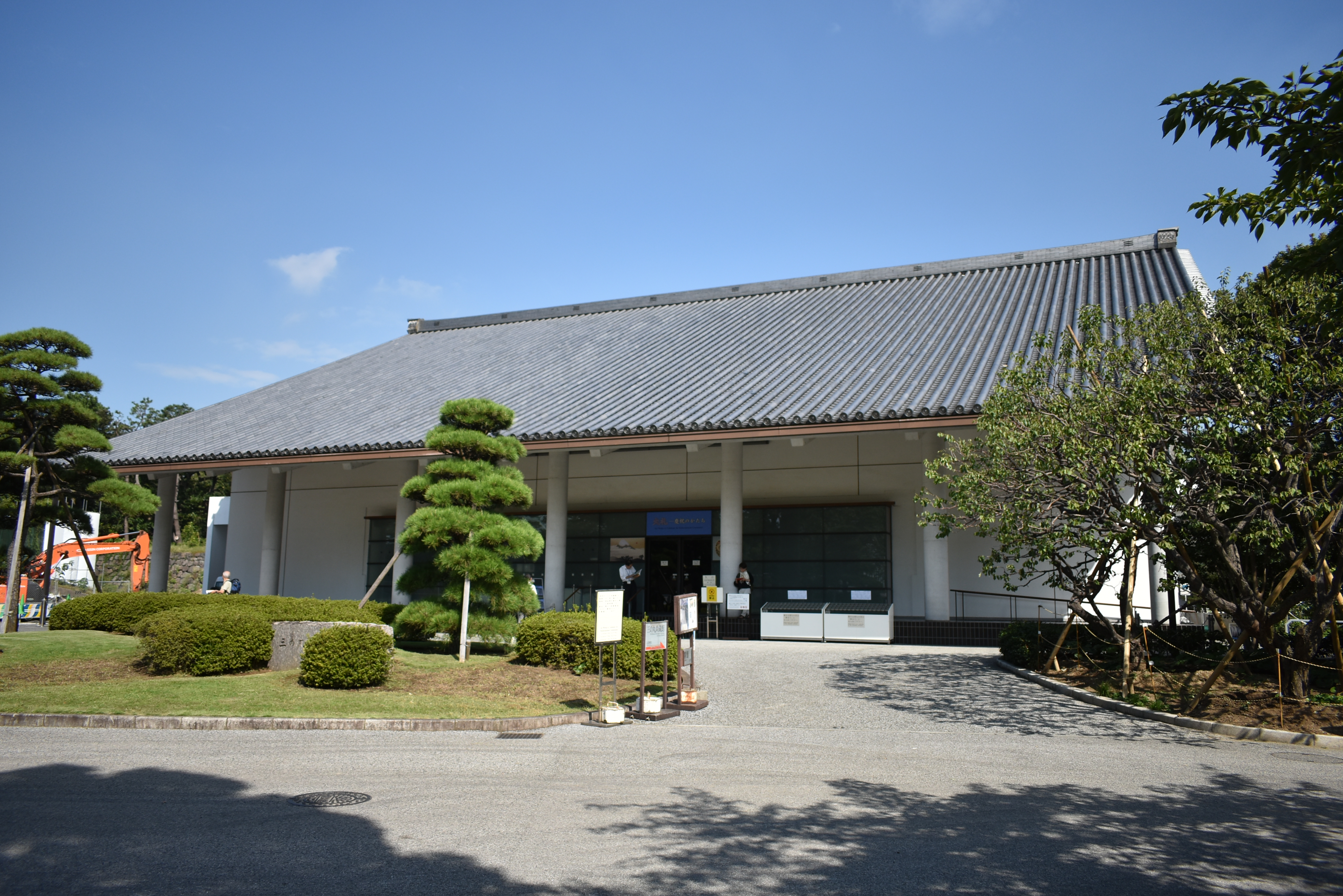
The old building that was in operation until the 2019 fiscal year.

The Museum of the Imperial Collections Sannomaru-Shōzōkan (三の丸尚蔵館) is located on the grounds of the East Garden of Tokyo Imperial Palace. It showcases a changing exhibition of a part of the imperial household treasures.

The museum is currently temporarily closed for renovations and will reopen in Fall 2026.

The Museum of the Imperial Collections was conceived during the change from the Shōwa period (1926 – 1989) to the Heisei period (1989 – 2019) . The Imperial family donated 6,000 pieces of art to the Japanese government in 1989. Many pieces were created by Imperial Household Artists. The museum was opened in 1993 for the study and preservation of the art collection. The collection was further enlarged by the donation of the art collection of Prince Chichibu (1902 – 1953) in 1996, the collection of Kikuko, Princess Takamatsu (1911 – 2004) in 2005, and the collection of Prince Mikasa family in 2014.

There are 9,800 items in the collection, but the exhibition room was only 160 square meters, and the storage room was also small. Therefore, it was decided that the museum would be rebuilt. Operations in the old building ended in 2019, and in 2023, operations resumed with the completion of the first phase of the new building constructed next to the old one. The second phase is scheduled to be completed in 2026, expanding the exhibition space to eight times its original size and the storage capacity to four times that of the old building.

In 2023, the museum was transferred from the Imperial Household Agency to the National Institutes for Cultural Heritage, and the system for managing the collection was revised, with the Agency for Cultural Affairs taking responsibility for the holdings.

== Selected artists ==
Karajishi-zu Byōbu (Byōbu depicting the Chinese lions) by Kanō Eitoku (16th century), National Treasure

Although the museum houses many masterpieces, none of them were designated as National Treasure or Important Cultural Property until 2021 because cultural properties owned by the Imperial Family or the Imperial Household Agency (i.e., cultural properties donated to the nation by the Imperial Family) are not subject to the Law for the Protection of Cultural Properties of Japan.

In 2018, in order to show the importance of cultural properties to many people in a way that is easy to understand, the Imperial Household Agency proposed that cultural properties under its management should also be designated as National Treasures or Important Cultural Properties. In July 2021, in response to a proposal made by the Imperial Household Agency, the Ministry of Education, Culture, Sports, Science and Technology decided to designate five cultural properties as National Treasures in the first stage of designation, including Mōko Shūrai Ekotoba, an emakimono depicting the Mongol invasion of Japan; Karajishi-zu Byōbu, a byōbu by Kano Eitoku; and Dōshoku sai-e, a painting by Itō Jakuchū.

=== Paintings ===
- Kaihō Yūshō (1533–1615)
- Kanō Eitoku (1543–1590)
- Iwasa Matabei (1578–1650)
- Kanō Tan'yū (1602–1674)
- Kanō Tsunenobu (1636–1713)
- Tawaraya Sōtatsu (early 17th century)
- Maruyama Ōkyo (1733–1795)
- Itō Jakuchū (1716–1800)
- Sakai Hōitsu (1761–1828)
- Hokusai (1760–1849)
Doshoku Sai-e (Realm of Living Beings, National Treasure) by Itō Jakuchū

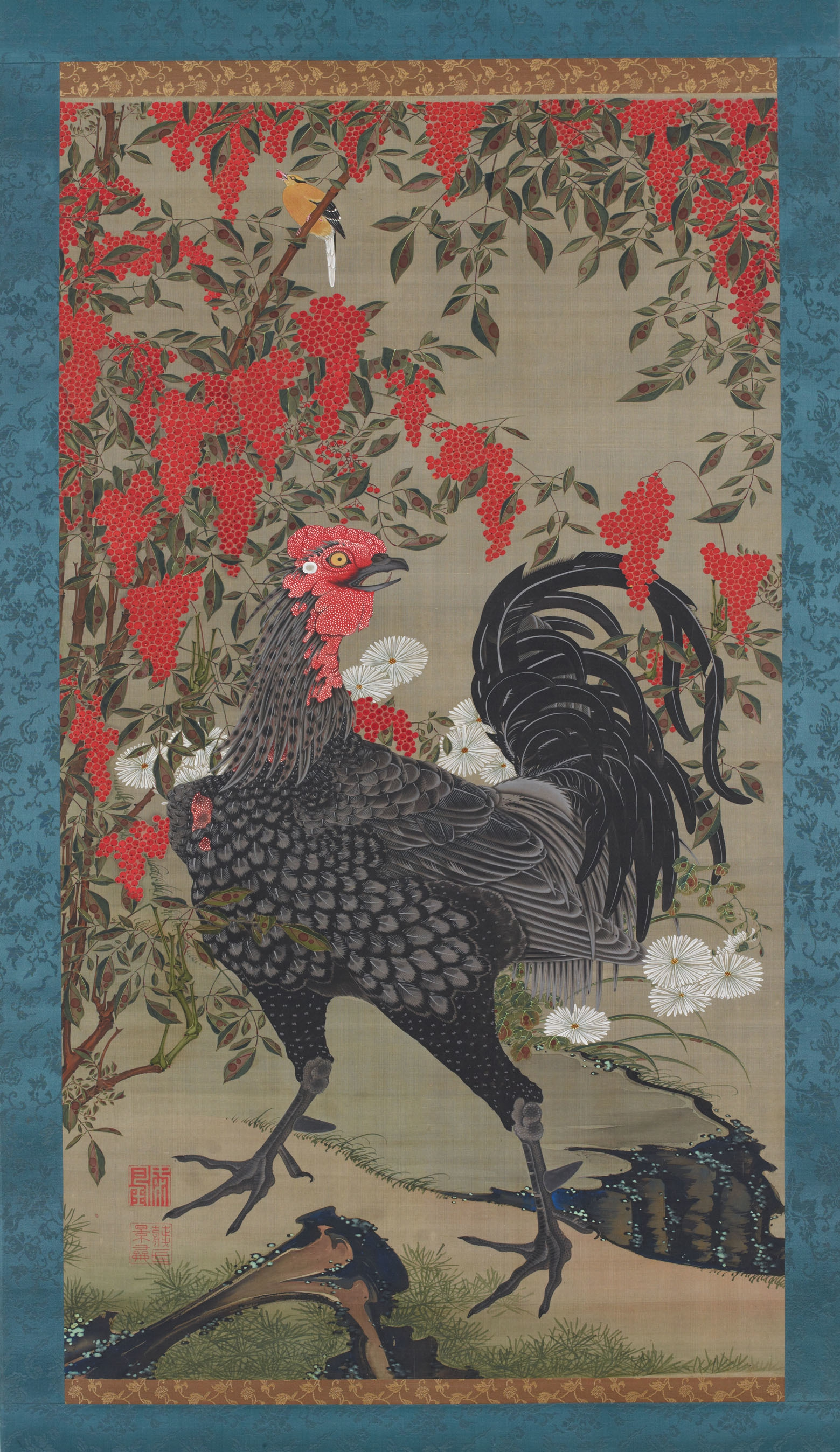
Black rooster and nandin

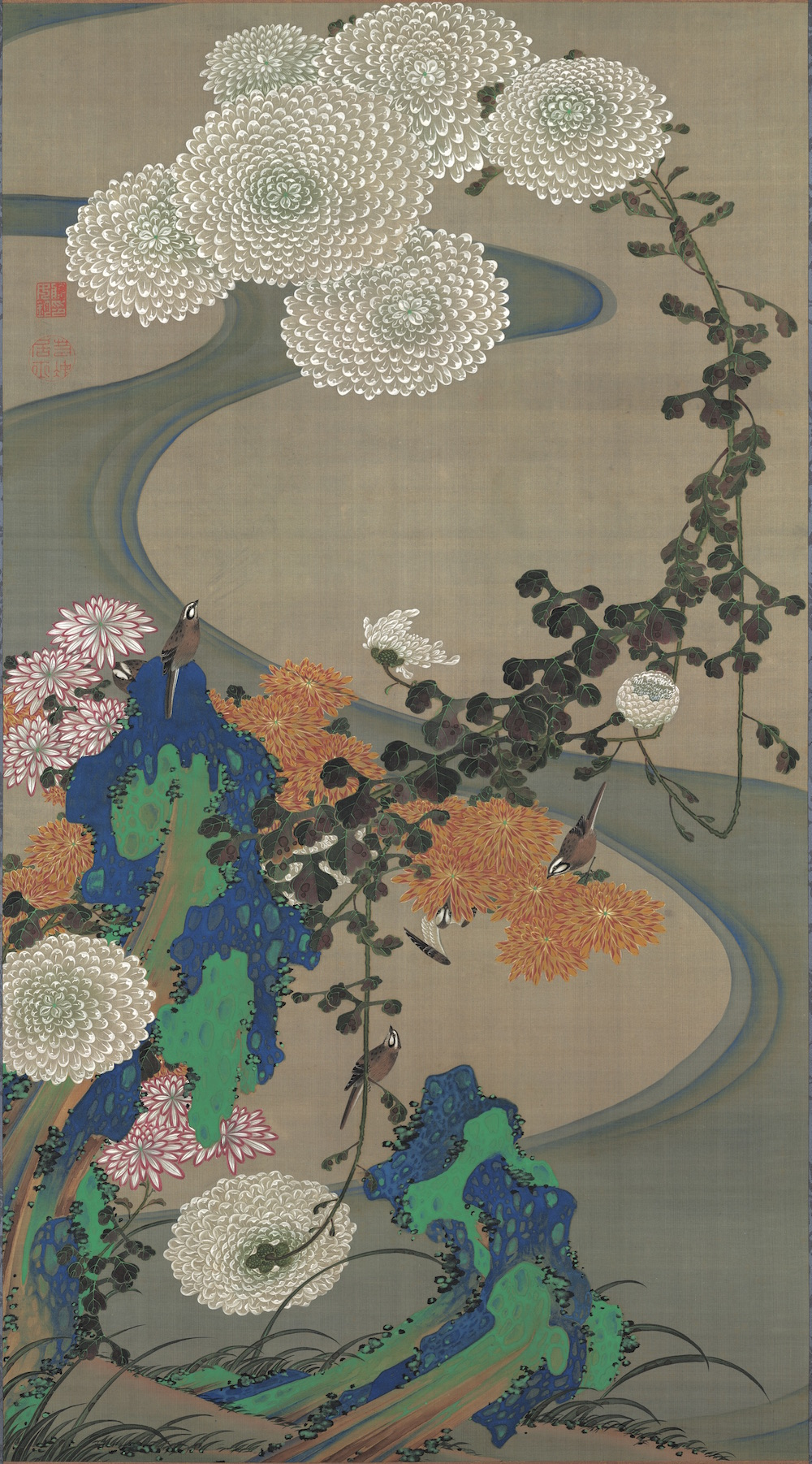
Chrysanthemums by a stream with rocks

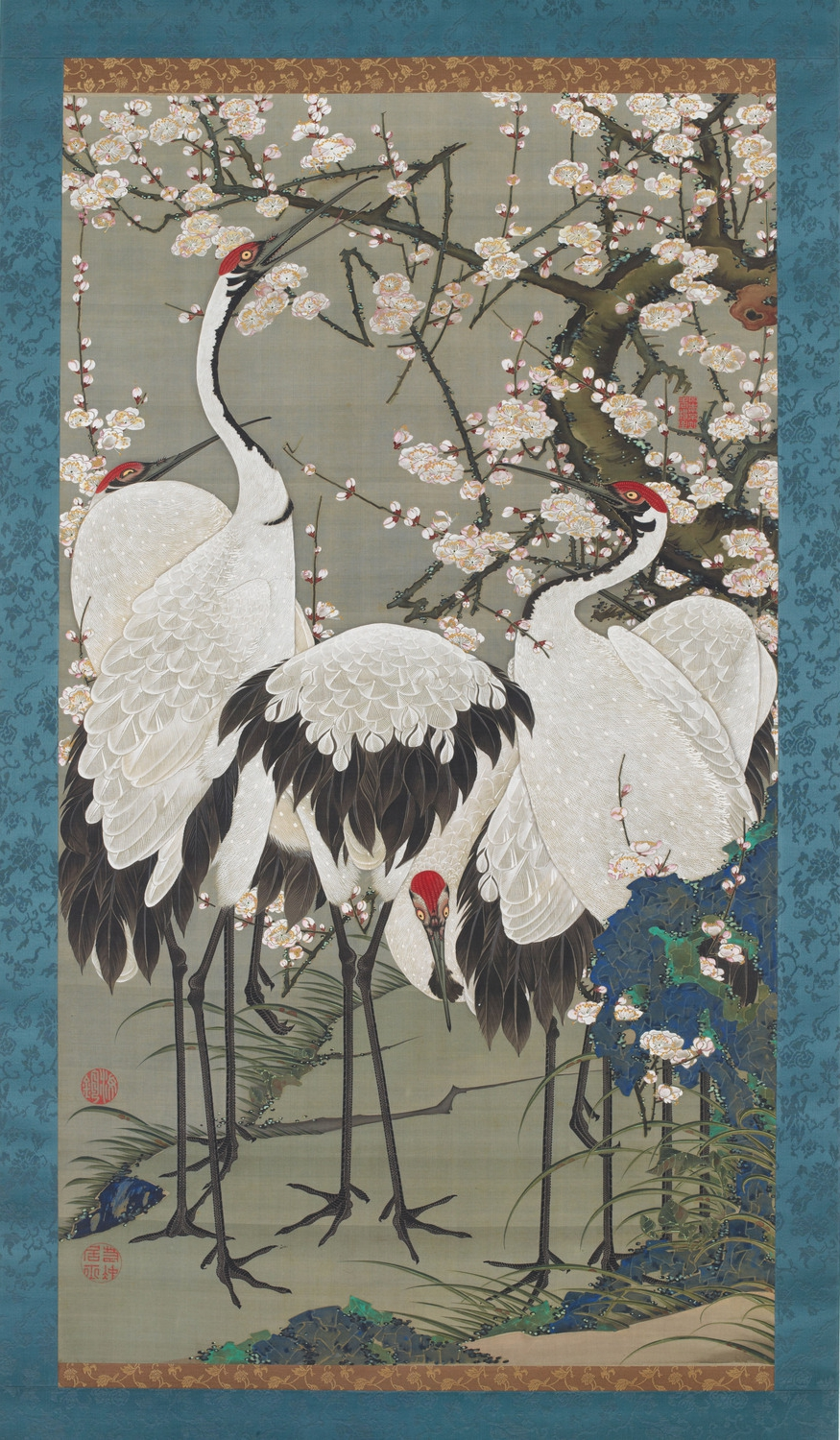
Plum Blossoms and Cranes

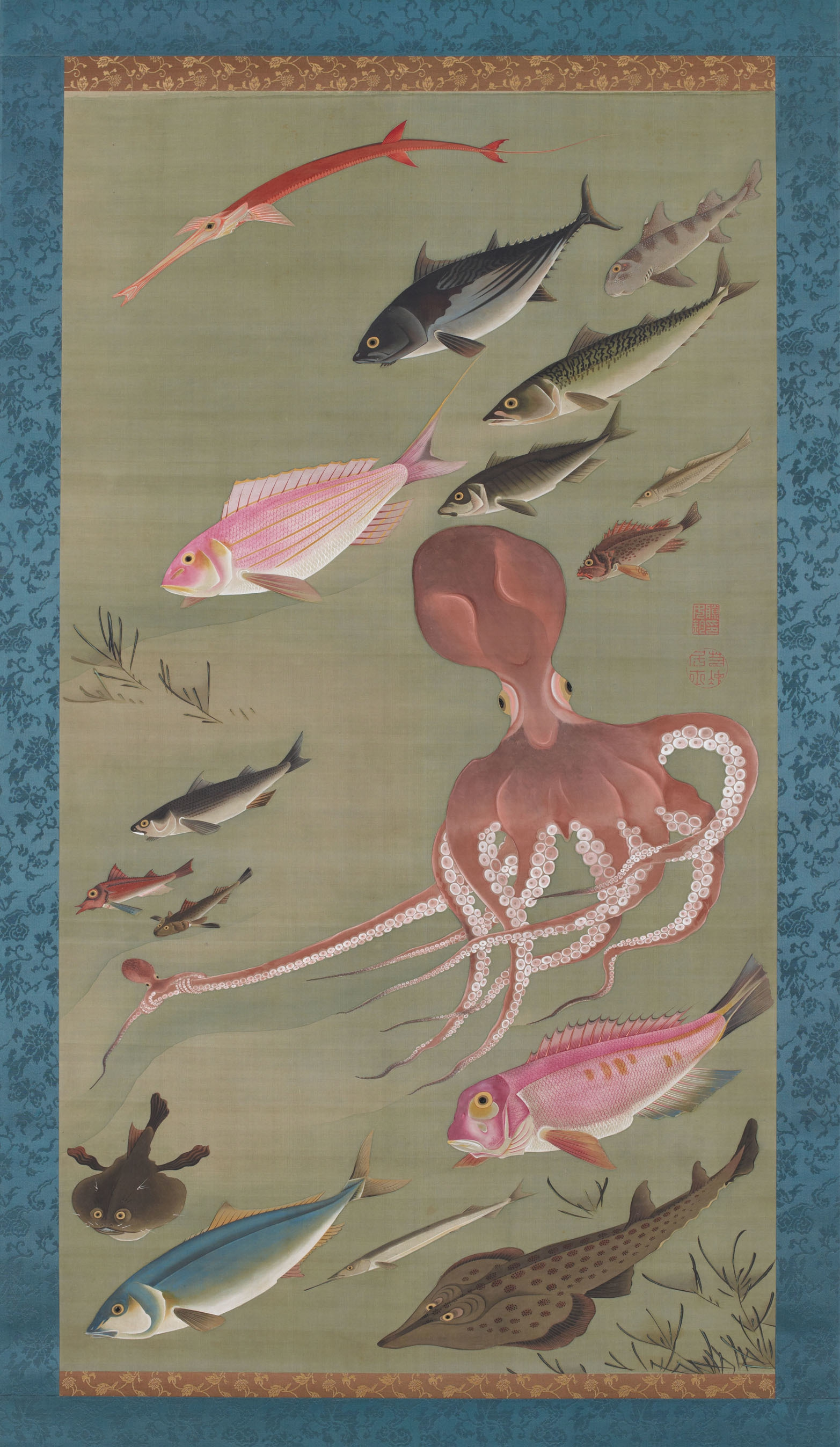
Fish and octopus

=== Calligraphy ===
- Wang Xizhi (303 – 361)
- Kūkai (774 – 835)
- Ono no Michikaze (894 – 966)
- Fujiwara no Sukemasa (944 – 998)
- Fujiwara no Kintō (966 – 1041)
- Fujiwara no Yukinari (972 – 1027)
- Minamoto no Shunrai (1055–1129)
- Fujiwara no Teika (1162–1241)
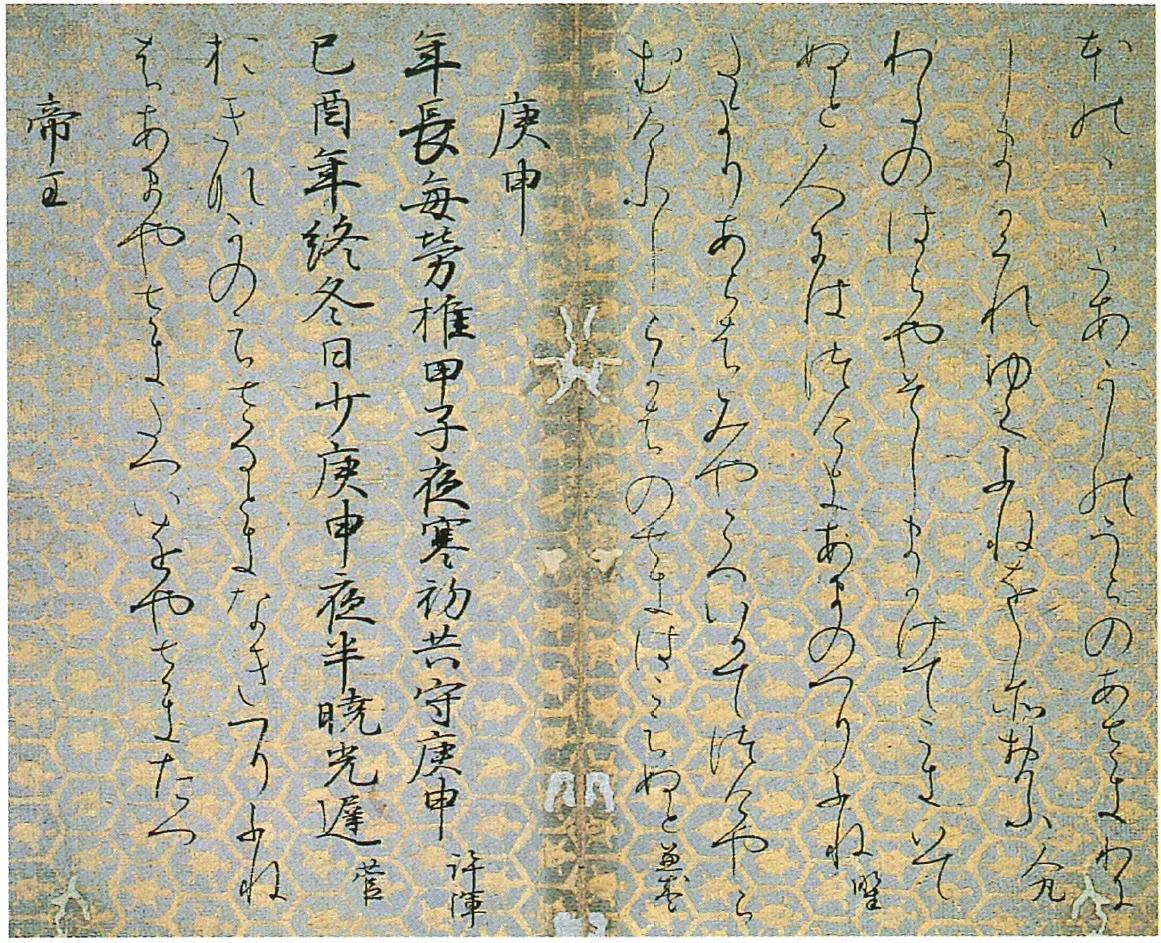
Poems from the anthology Wakan rōeishū. Decchō version. Attributed to Fujiwara no Yukinari. Book, ink on decorated paper. National Treasure

=== Nihonga ===
- Yokoyama Taikan (1868–1958)
- Kanzan Shimomura (1873–1930)
- Tomioka Tessai (1837–1924)
- Takeuchi Seihō (1864–1942)
- Kawai Gyokudō (1873–1957)
- Uemura Shōen (1875–1949)

=== Sculptures and crafts ===
- Kawanobe Itcho (1831–1910)
- Miyagawa Kōzan (1842-1916)
- Asahi Gyokuzan (1843–1923)
- Unnno Shomin (1844–1915)
- Namikawa Yasuyuki (1845–1927)
- Namikawa Sōsuke (1847–1910)
- Ishikawa Komei (1852–1913)
- Takamura Kōun (1852–1934)
- Suwa Sozan (1851–1922)
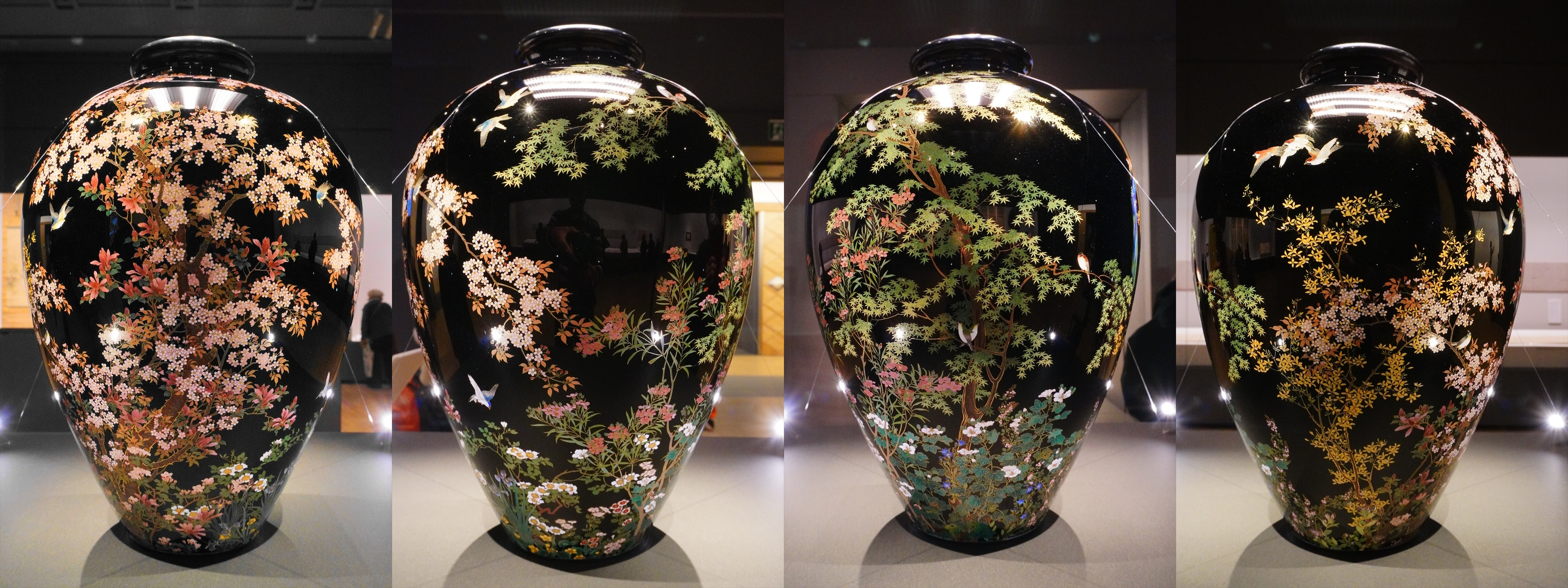
Vase with Birds and Flowers of the Four Seasons, Namikawa Yasuyuki, 1899. Important Cultural Property
