= Ono no Takamura =

Japanese scholar and poet (802–853)

- 小野 篁
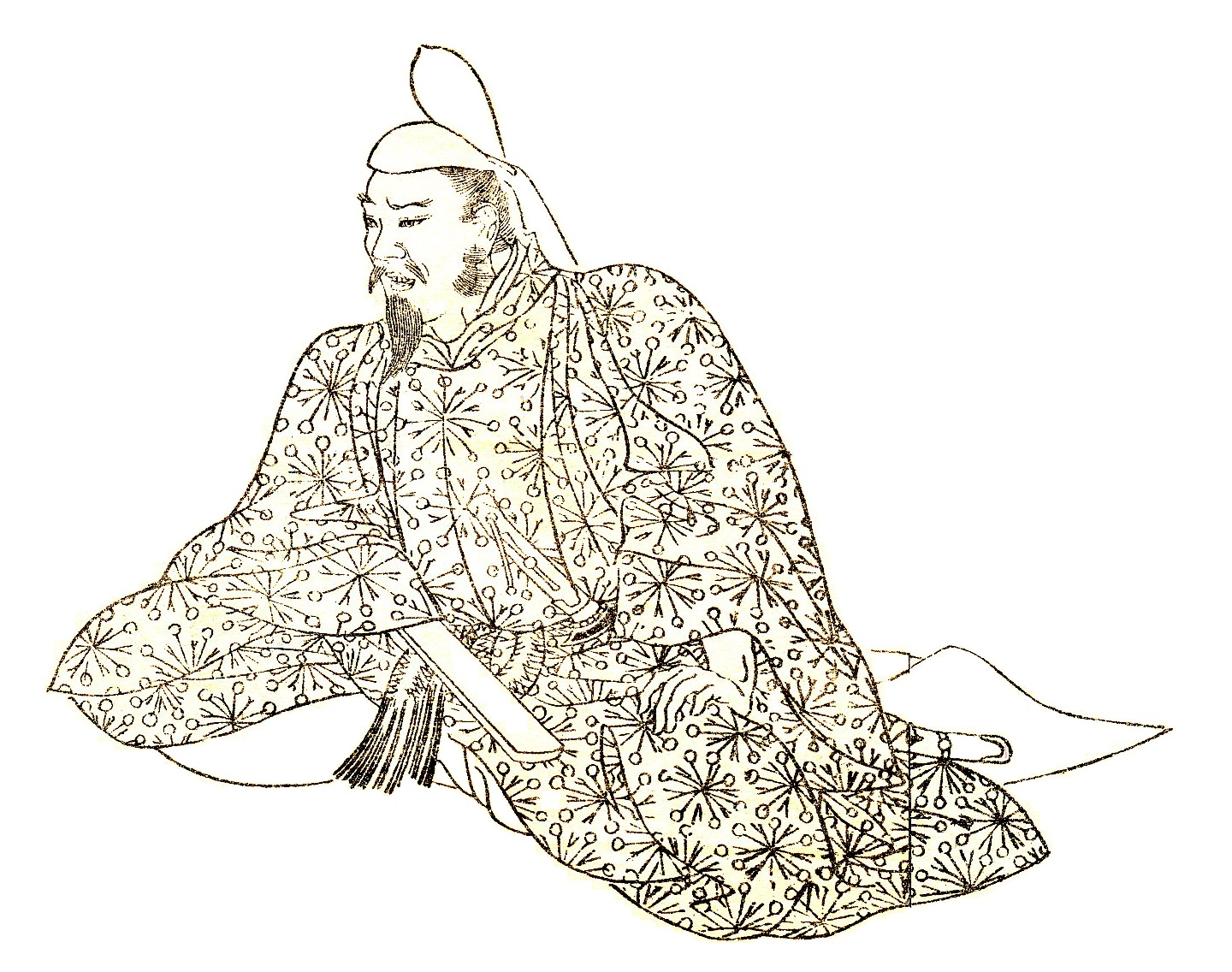
- Ono no Takamura, in a book illustration by Kikuchi Yōsai
- Born: 802
- Died: February 3, 853
- Other name: Sangi no Takamura (参議篁)
- Occupations: Calligrapher, poet
- Era: Heian period

Ono no Takamura (小野 篁; 802 – February 3, 853), also known as Sangi no Takamura (参議篁), was a Japanese calligrapher and poet of the early Heian period.

== Life ==
Takamura's father was Ono no Minemori. He was the grandfather of Ono no Michikaze, one of the Sanseki (three famous Heian period calligraphers).

In 834, he was appointed to a kentōshi (Japanese mission to Tang China). In 838, after a quarrel with the envoy, Fujiwara no Tsunetsugu, he gave up his professional duties pretending to be ill, and attracted the ire of retired Emperor Saga, who sent him to Oki Province. Within two years he regained the graces of the court, and he returned to the capital where he was promoted to Sangi (associate counselor in the imperial court of Japan).

Takamura is the subject of a number of odd stories and legends. One of the most singular of these legends is the claim that, every night, he would climb down a well to hell and help Yama in his judgements.

In Kita-ku, Kyoto, there is a grave said to belong to Takamura.

== Takamura in later literature ==
Takamura features in several later setsuwa works such as Uji Shūi Monogatari and Takamura Monogatari.

=== Uji Shūi Monogatari ===
Uji Shūi Monogatari contains a story illustrating Takamura's wit. One day, in the palace of Saga Tennō, someone put up a scroll with the writing "無悪善 (no evil goodness)". No one in the palace was able to decipher its meaning. The emperor ordered Takamura to read it, and he responded:

"it will be good if there is no evil (悪無くば善からん, saga nakuba yokaran)",

reading the character for evil (悪, aku) as "Saga" to indicate Saga Tennō. The emperor was incensed at his audacity and proclaimed that because only Takamura was able to read the scroll, he must have been the one who put it up. Takamura pleaded his innocence, saying that he was simply deciphering the meaning of the scroll. The emperor said, "Oh, so you can decipher any writing, can you?" and asked Takamura to read a row of twelve characters for child (子):

"子子子子子子子子子子子子".

Takamura immediately responded:

"the cat's young kitten, the lion's young cub (猫の子子猫、獅子の子子獅子, neko no ko koneko, shishi no ko kojishi)",

using the variant readings ne, ko, shi, and ji for the character 子.

The emperor was amused by Takamura's wit and withdrew the accusation.

=== Takamura Monogatari ===
Takamura is the main character in the tale Takamura Monogatari, where he has a romantic affair with his half-sister. Few scholars take it to be historically reliable.

== Representative poems ==
One of his poems is included as No. 11 in Fujiwara no Teika's Ogura Hyakunin Isshu:

Japanese text
Romanized Japanese
English translation

わたの原
八十島かけて
漕ぎ出でぬと
人には告げよ
海人の釣舟

Wata no hara
yaso shima kakete
kogi-idenu to
hito ni wa tsugeyo
ama no tsuri-bune

Fishing boats upon this sea!
Tell whoever asks
I am being rowed away to exile
out past the many islets
to the vast ocean beyond.

Takamura contributed six poems to the Kokin Wakashū: #335, 407, 829, 845, 936, and 961. The following is poem 829.

Japanese text
Romanized Japanese
English translation

泣く涙
雨と降らなむ
渡り河
水まさりなば
かへり来るがに

naku namida
ame to furanan
watari gawa
mizu masarinaba
kaeri kuru ga ni

Let the tears I cry
fall from my face like the rain.
If they overflow
the river to the next world,
maybe you can return home.

== Works related to Takamura ==
- Tatsumiya. 冥界伝説：たかむらの井戸 [Tales from the Realm of the Dead: Takamura's Well].
- Yūko Satsuma. 札屋一蓮！.
- Yū Itō (1997). 鬼の橋 [Devil's Bridge]. 福音館書店. ISBN 4-8340-1571-8.

== See also ==
- Japanese literature
