= Fujiwara no Yoshitaka =

Japanese waka poet

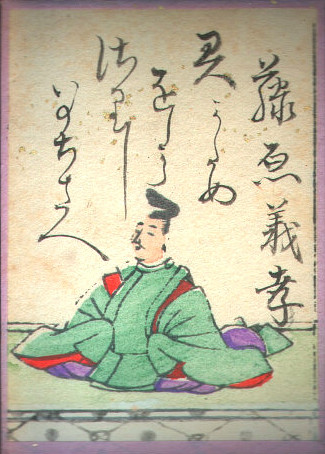
Fujiwara no Yoshitaka, from the Ogura Hyakunin Isshu.

Fujiwara no Yoshitaka (藤原 義孝; 954–974) was a Japanese waka poet of the mid-Heian period. One of his poems was included in the Ogura Hyakunin Isshu. He produced a private waka collection, the Yoshitaka-shū.

== Biography ==
Yoshitaka was born in 954, the son of Fujiwara no Koretada.

He served as captain of the right bodyguards (右少将, ushōshō). He was the father of the respected calligrapher Yukinari. When his father died, Yoshitaka considered ordaining as a Buddhist monk. In the same year his son was born, which dissuaded him from pursuing a religious career.

He died in 974, at age twenty, of smallpox, on the same day as his twin brother.

== Poetry ==
Twelve of his poems were included in imperial anthologies, and he was listed as one of the Late Classical Thirty-Six Immortals of Poetry.

The following poem by him was included as No. 50 in Fujiwara no Teika's Ogura Hyakunin Isshu:

Japanese text	Romanized Japanese	English translation
君がため 惜しからざりし 命さへ 長くもがなと 思ひけるかな	Kimi ga tame oshikarazarishi inochi sae nagaku mogana to omoikeru kana	I always thought I would give my life to meet you only once, but now, having spent a night with you, I wish that I may go on living forever.

He left a private collection, the Yoshitaka-shū (義孝集).

== Bibliography ==
- McMillan, Peter. 2010 (1st ed. 2008). One Hundred Poets, One Poem Each. New York: Columbia University Press.
- Suzuki Hideo, Yamaguchi Shin'ichi, Yoda Yasushi. 2009 (1st ed. 1997). Genshoku: Ogura Hyakunin Isshu. Tokyo: Bun'eidō.
