= Broken Stone in Uji Bridge =

Stone inscription in Japan

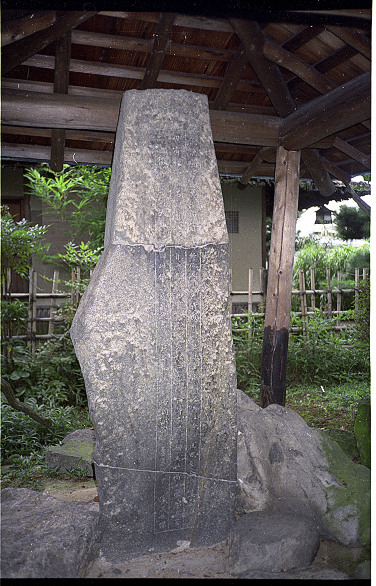
Broken Stone in Uji Bridge (Ujibashi Danpi)

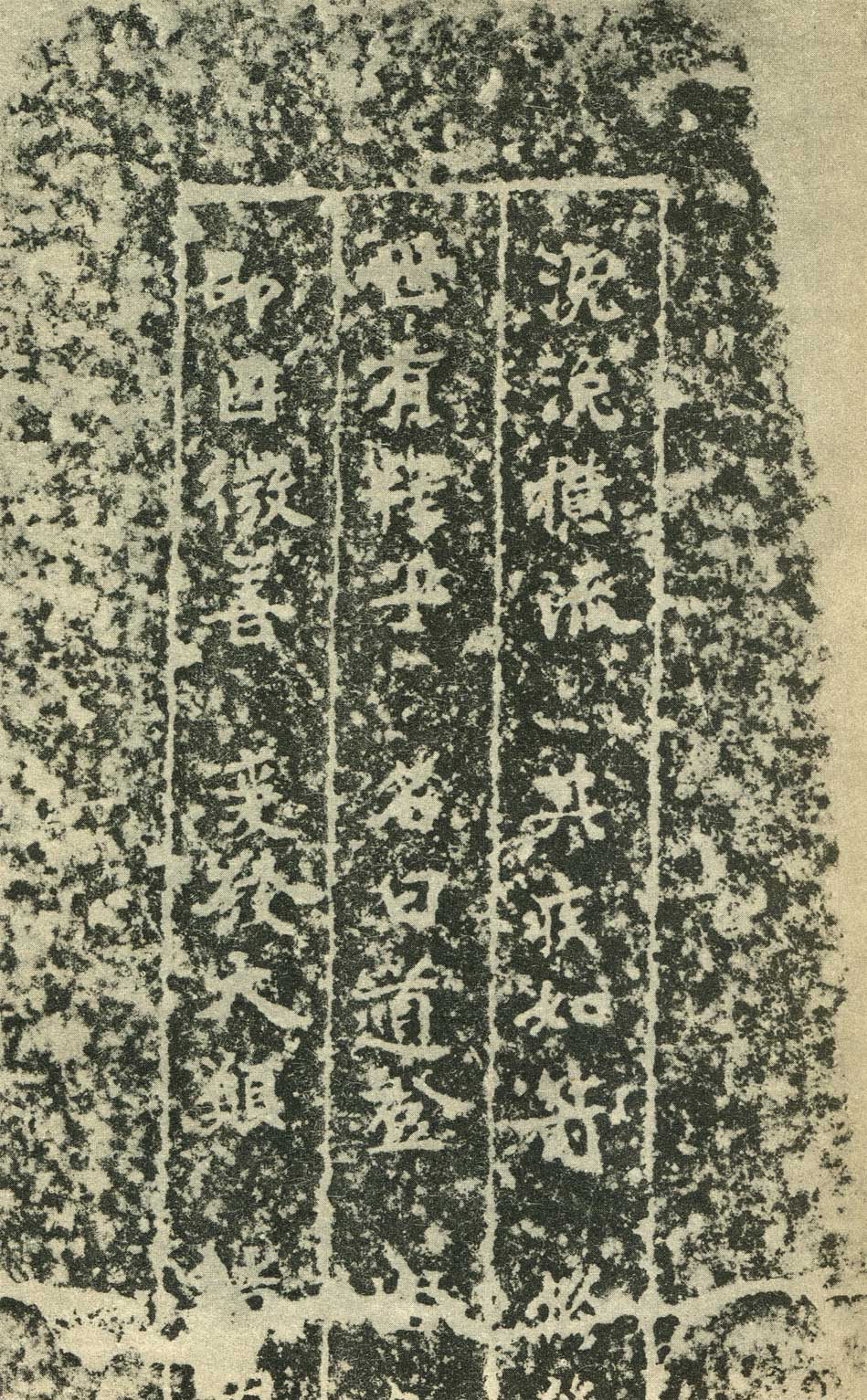
A rubbing of the top part of the inscription.

Broken Stone in Uji Bridge (宇治橋断碑, ujibashi danpi) is the oldest stone inscription in Japan and the earliest example of Japanese calligraphy. This stone commemorated the construction of Uji Bridge, which was completed in 646. The inscription states that the bridge was built by a monk named Dōtō (道登). However, this is contradicted by the 8th-century Shoku Nihongi, which states that the bridge was built by another monk named Dōshō (道昭).
