= Hatakeyama Memorial Museum of Fine Art =

Coordinates: 35°37′56.3″N 139°43′36.8″E

Ebara Hatakeyama Museum of Art
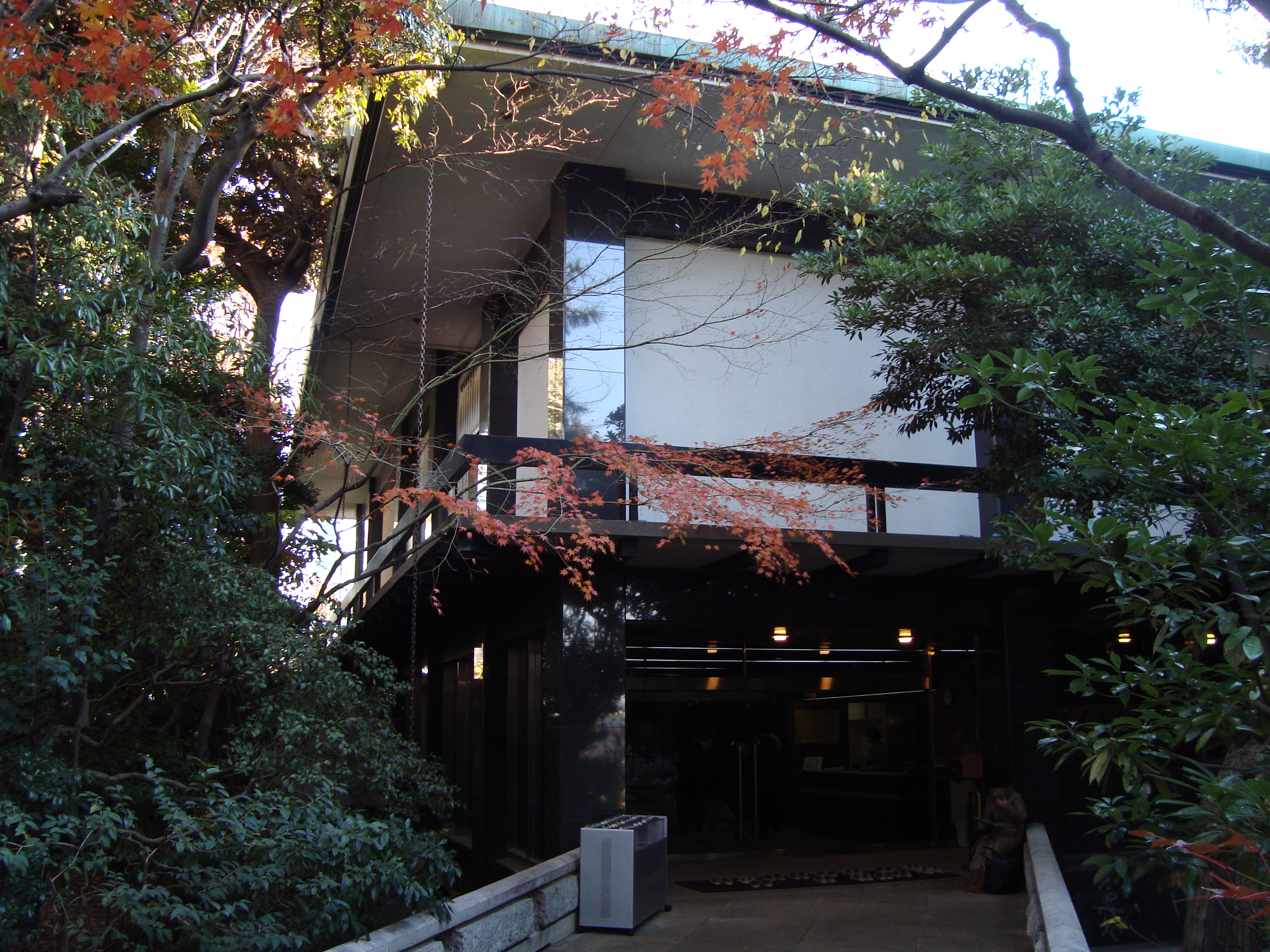
- Hatakeyama Memorial Museum
- Established: October 1964
- Location: 2-20-12 Shirokanedai Minato-ku Tokyo 108-0071 Japan
- Type: Art museum
- Public transit access: Takanawadai Station
- Website: https://www.hatakeyama-museum.org/

The Hatakeyama Memorial Museum of Fine Art (畠山記念館, Hatakeyama Kinenkan) is a private museum established in October 1964 in Tokyo, Japan.

In October 2024, the museum was renamed the Ebara Hatakeyama Museum of Art. The museum reopened on 5 October 2024 after having closed for renovations.

== History ==
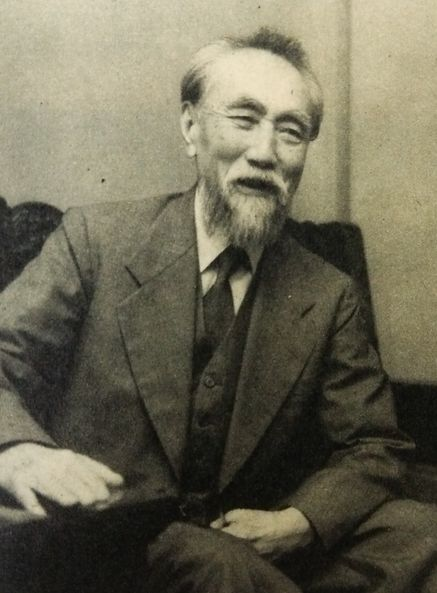
Hatakeyama Issē (28 December 1881 - 17 November 1971

The first museum director, Hatakeyama Issē (28 December 1881 - 17 November 1971) was the founder of Ebara Corporation. In 1937, Hatakeyama purchased the landlot once Count Terashima Munenori resided, and relocated and rebuilt an old guest house from Hannyaji in Nara which he named "Hannyaen", where a house warming tea ceremony was held in 1943. As Hatakeyama practiced Hōshō school noh since he was young, he acquired a private noh theater and reassembled on the property. There are noh costumes among the collection.

Hatakeyama's collection was moved to a museum he built in 1964 next to his residence as he planned to preserve it for many years and hold exhibitions for the public as well as support researchers.

There is a tea house called Shō-an in the museum building, and those in the garden are for rent; Sara-an, Sui-an, Meigetsuken, Shin zashiki, Jōrakutei and Bishamondō. Once a year, a guided tour is held to visit those tea houses.

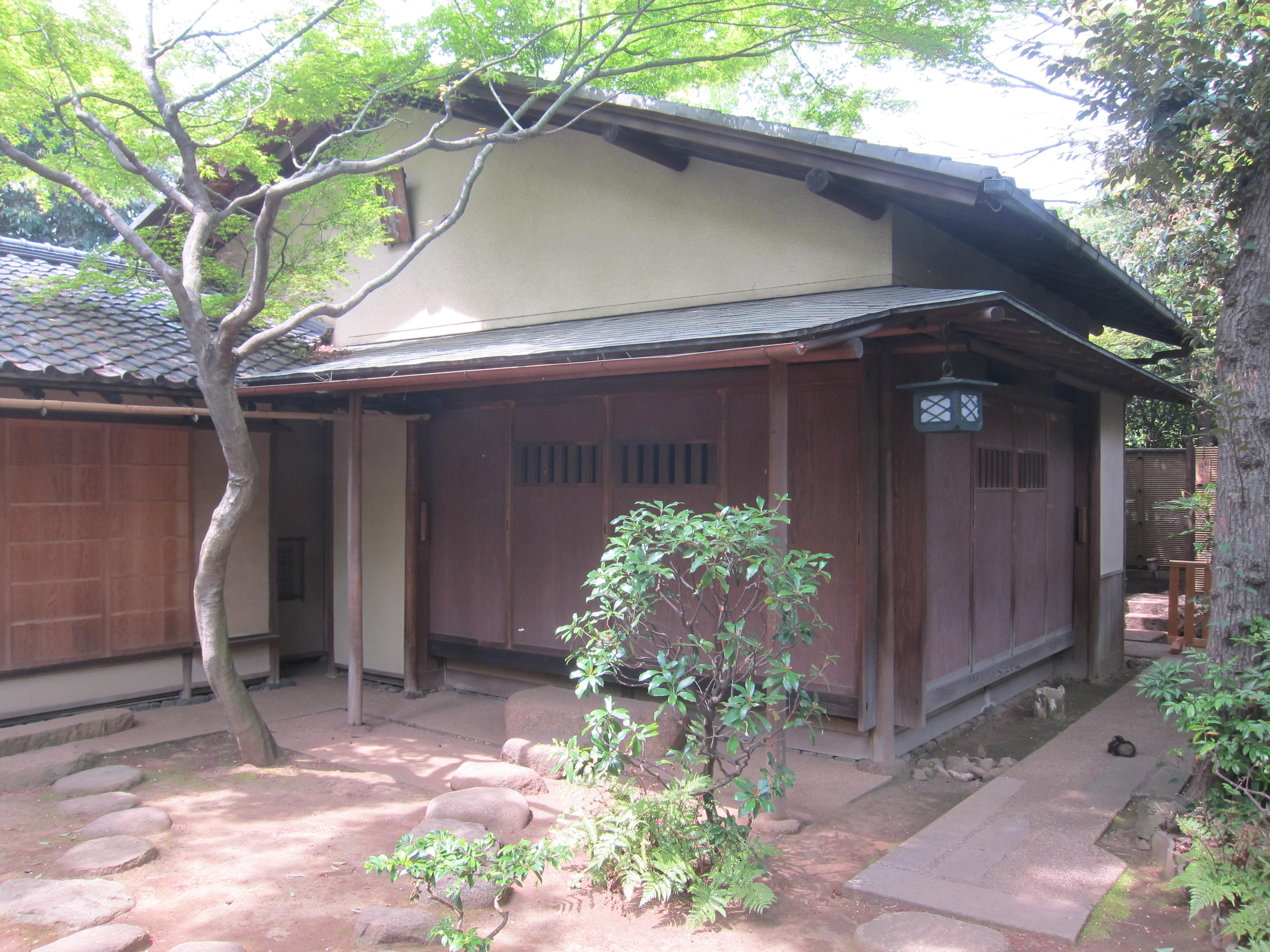
Jōrakutei tea house

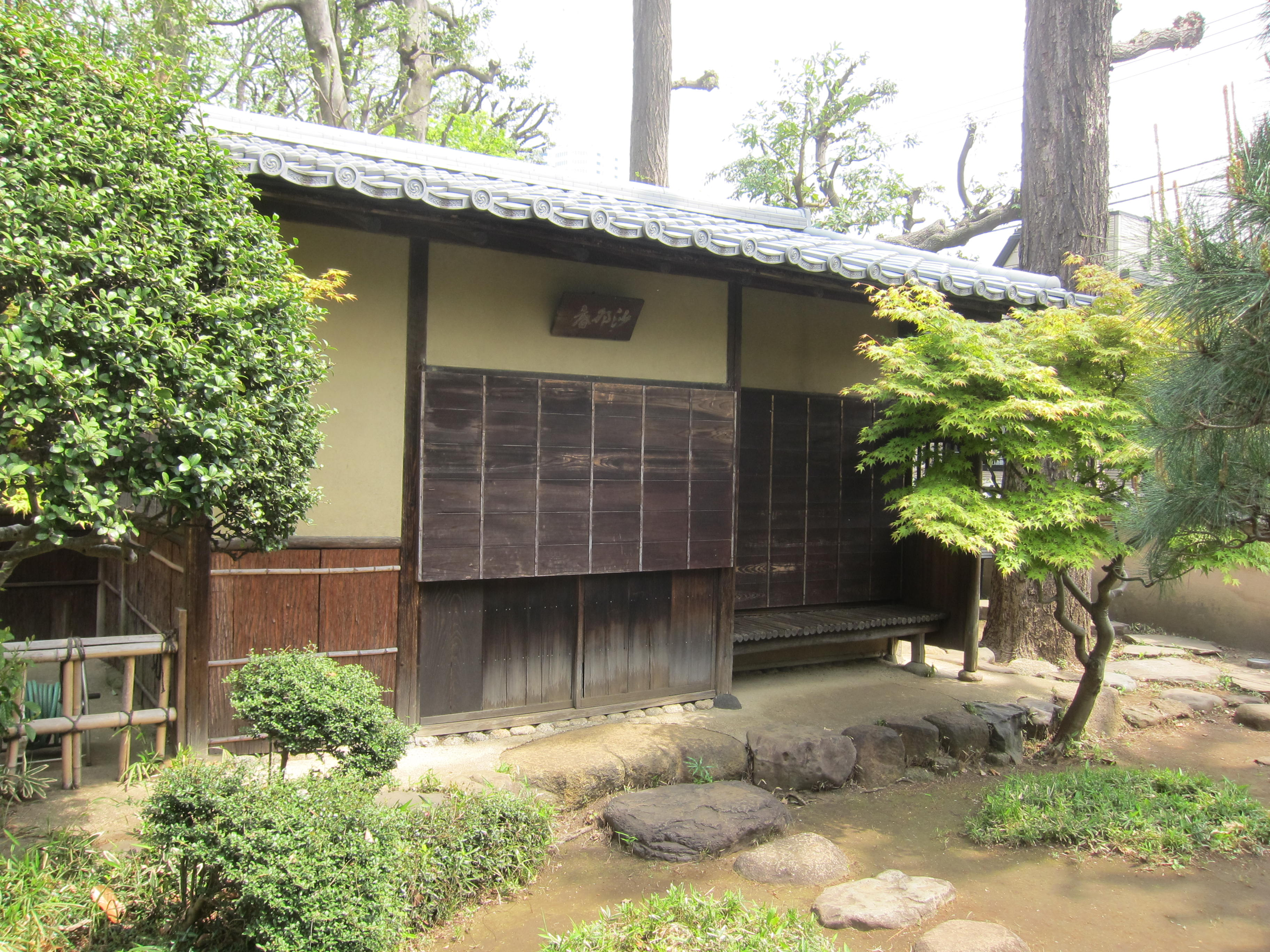
Sara-an tea house

== Notable collections ==
The museum holds four exhibition each year. Centered on tea utensils, the collection consists of old Japanese, Chinese and Korean works of art such as paintings, calligraphic writings, pottery, lacquer items and Noh costumes. Of the circa 1,300 objects in the collection, 6 are National Treasures and 32 have been designated as Important Cultural Properties of Japan.

National treasures

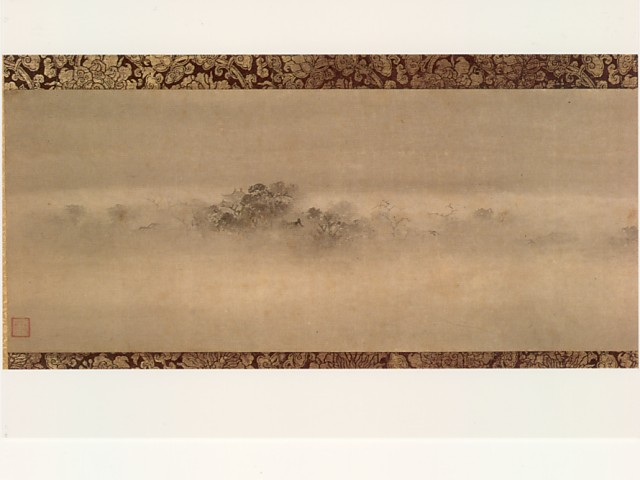
Evening bell from mist-shrouded temple

- Letter of Fujiwara no Sukemasa Rirakuchō (離洛帖), a National treasure designated as of 28 June 1956. Ink on paper, Japan.
- Evening bell from mist-shrouded temple attributed to Muqi Fachang Enji banshō-zu (煙寺晩鐘図 伝 牧谿筆), ink on silk, Southern Song, China.
- Painting of Apple blossom attributed to Zhao Chang Ringo kazu (林檎花図 伝 趙昌筆), painting on silk Southern Song, China.
- Fragmentary Leaves of Zenki-zu depicting a zen monk's life, attributed to Indara (禅機図断簡 因陀羅筆 楚石梵琦賛), ink on paper. Yuan dynasty, China.
- Letter of Daie Sōkō (1089–1163) Daie Sōkō bokuseki sekitoku (大慧宗杲墨蹟 尺牘), ink on paper. Southern Song, China.
- Box with butterfly inlay Chō raden makie tebako (蝶螺鈿蒔絵手), lacquerware with mother-of-pearl inlay. Kamakura period, Japan.

Important Cultural Property

- Bokuseki of Yuanwu Keqin, 12 February 1128, an Important Cultural Property designated on 25 May 1939. Engo kokugon bokuseki (Ken'en 2-nen 2-gatsu 12-nichi) (圜悟克勤墨蹟 (建炎二年二月十二日))
- Bokuseki of Nanso Shisetsu, Fall, 1342 Nanso Shisetsu bokuseki (Shisei 2-nen aki) (南楚師説墨蹟 (至正二年秋))
- Portrait of Hideyoshi Toyotomi on silk cloth, an Important Cultural Property designated on 6 May 1936. Kenpon chakushoku Toyotomi Hideyoshi-zō (Keichō 3-nen 8-gatsu san) (絹本著色豊臣秀吉像〈慶長三年八月日賛〉) With legend dated August 1598.

Tea cups

- "Kōshin" Koido jawan (江岑)
- "Denchū" Ao idojawan (田中)
- Amamori-jawan (雨漏茶碗)
- Nicknamed "Matsudaira kohiki" Kohiki-jawan (松平粉引)

Painting

- Kiyotaki gongen gazō (清滝権現画像)

Decorative art

- Handscroll of "Kokin Wakashū", with design of flowers of four seasons (金銀泥四季草花下絵古今集和歌巻)

== Publications ==
The museum has published a number of books about its collection and special exhibitions:

- Yoshū Aigan: Hatakeyama Sokuō’s World of Beauty (2011)
- Companionship Among Sukisha in Modern Times: Masuda Don’o, Yokoi Yau and Hatakeyama Sokuō (2017)
- Collection of the Ebara Hatakeyama Museum of Art: The Art of Rimpa (2025)
- The Refined Aesthetic Taste of Feudal Lord and Tea Master Fudai Matsudaira: Renowned Tea Ceremony Utensils from the “Unshū Kurachō” (2025)
