= Sanpitsu =

The term Sanpitsu (三筆) or "three brushes" is used in Japanese to refer to a group of three famous Heian period calligraphers:

- Emperor Saga 嵯峨天皇, 786–842.
- Kūkai 空海, 774–835.
- Tachibana no Hayanari, 橘逸勢 c. 782-842.

Later groups of calligraphers were named in imitation of the original Sanpitsu.

== Kan'ei Sanpitsu (寛永三筆) ==
Named for the Kan'ei period in which they flourished:

- Honami Kōetsu 本阿弥光悦, 1558-1637
- Konoe Nobutada 近衛信尹, 1565-1614
- Shōkadō Shōjō 松花堂昭乗, 1584-1639

== Ōbaku no Sanpitsu (黄檗三筆) ==
Zen Chinese calligraphers who worked in Japan.

- Ingen Ryūki, 隱元隆琦 1592-1673
- Mokuan Shōtō,木庵性瑫 1611-1684
- Sokuhi Nyoitsu, 即非如一 1616-1671

== Bakumatsu no Sanpitsu (幕末の三筆) ==
- Ichikawa Beian (市河米庵) 1779-1858
- Nukina Sūō (貫名菘翁) 1778-1863
- Maki Ryōko (巻菱湖) 1777-1843

== Meiji no Sanpitsu (明治の三筆) ==
- Nakabayashi Gochiku (中林梧竹) 1827-1913
- Kusakabe Meikaku (日下部鳴鶴) 1838-1922
- Iwaya Ichiroku (巌谷一六) 1834-1905

== Shōwa no Sanpitsu (昭和の三筆) ==
- Hibino Gohō (日比野五鳳) 1901-1985
- Teshima Yūkei (手島右卿) 1901-1987
- Nishikawa Yasushi (西川寧) 1902-1989

== See also ==
- Sanseki, a similar group of renowned calligraphers
