= Kongō Jōdaranikyō =

Kongō Jōdaranikyō (金剛場陀羅尼経, "Dhāraṇī of the Adamantine Place") is a Japanese sūtra of the Vajrayana school of Buddhism. Copied by the priest Hōrin in 686, it is the oldest hand-copied sūtra in Japan and is designated as a National Treasure. Hōrin based his copy on the original by Jñānagupta (523–600).
