= Ono no Michikaze =

Japanese calligrapher (894–966)

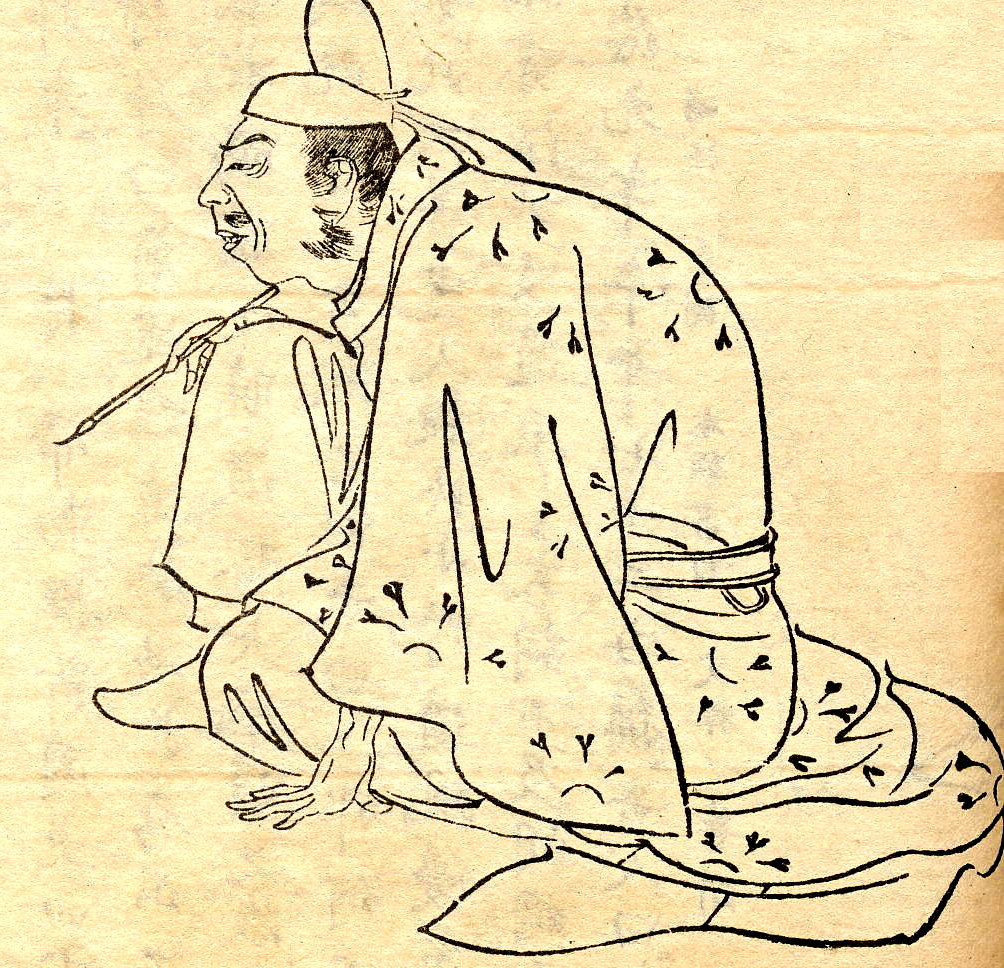
Ono no Michikaze

Ono no Michikaze or Ono no Tōfū (小野 道風; 894 – February 9, 966) was a prominent shodōka (Japanese calligrapher) during the Heian period (794–1185). One of the so-called Sanseki 三跡 (Three Brush Traces), along with Fujiwara no Sukemasa and Fujiwara no Yukinari, Michikaze is considered the founder of Japanese-style calligraphy or wayōshodō (和様書道). He is popularly extolled in Japan as the "reincarnation of Wang Xizhi".

He was also known as Yaseki Tōfū.

== Life ==
Michikaze was born in the present Kasugai, Aichi prefecture, as the grandson of a courtier-poet, Ono no Takamura. He was a government official, a poet and a calligrapher. He provided highly distinguished calligraphic services for three emperors during his career: Daigo (r. 897–930), Suzaku (r. 930–946) and Murakami (r. 946–967). Michikaze's fame permitted him to serve, at the age of twenty-seven, in the Seiryoden, the residential quarters of the imperial court.

As a recognition of the calligrapher's high skill, Emperor Daigo offered the Buddhist monk Kanken two volumes of Michikaze's works in 927 and urged him to take them with him on a voyage to China to introduce Michikaze's calligraphic achievements to the Chinese.

Michikaze had lost much of his sight by the time he died.

== Works ==
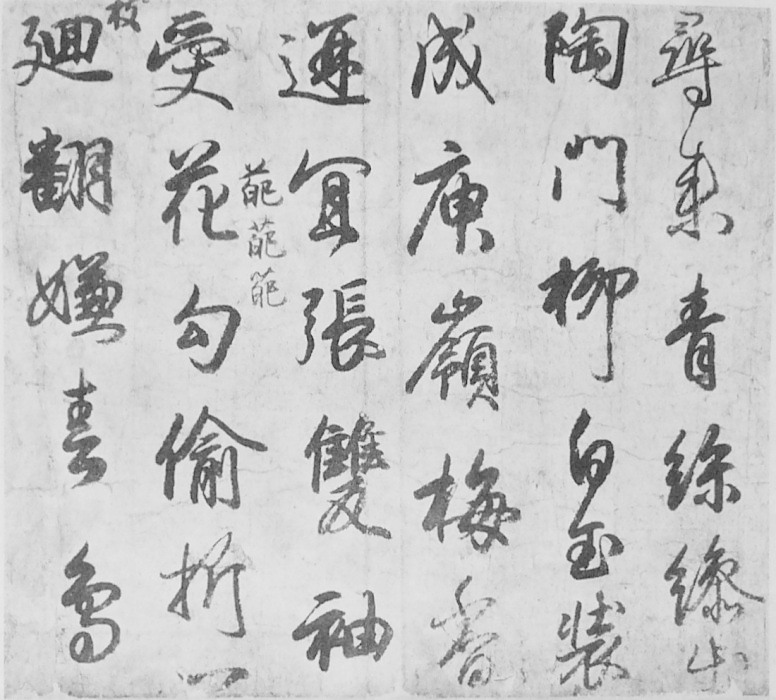
Draft for an inscription on byōbu detail

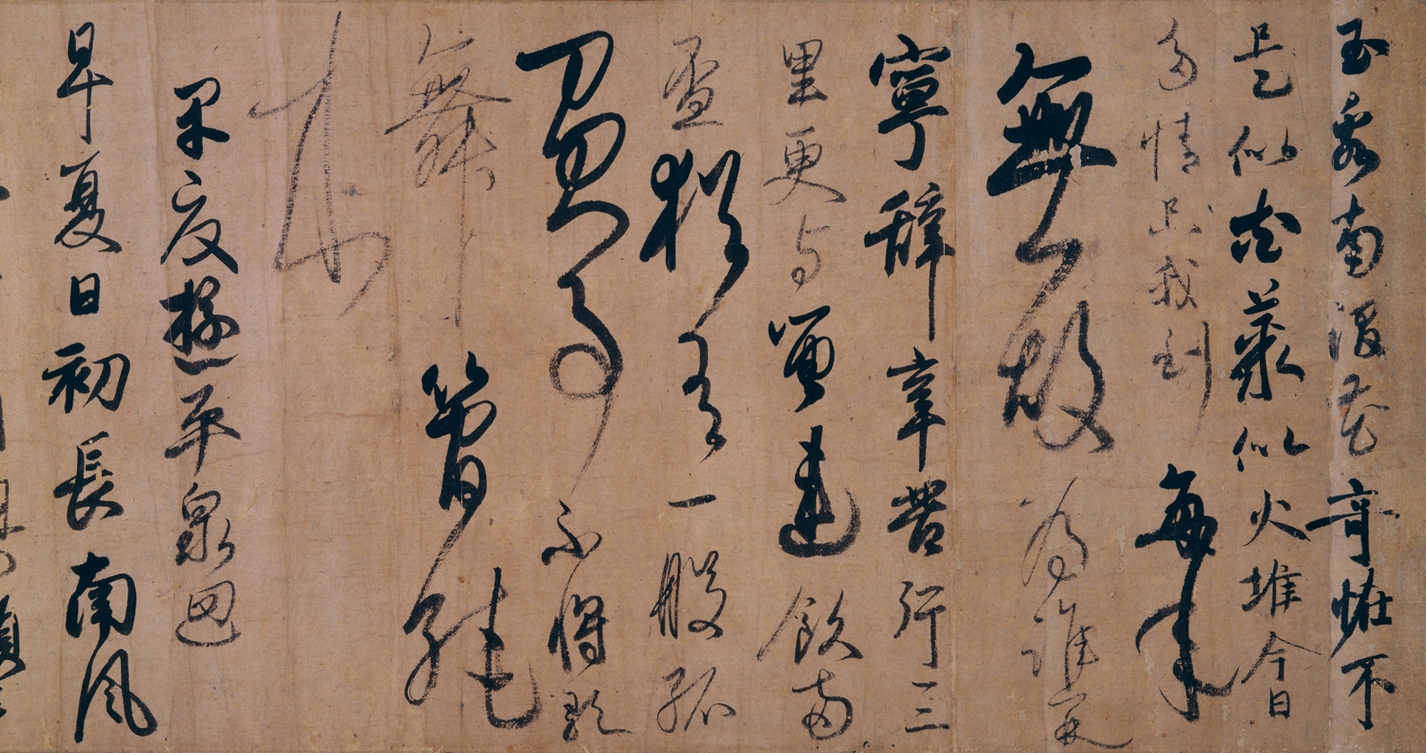
Gyokusen-jo Opening

Michikaze took the first step in Japanizing the art of calligraphy, imported from China around the 5th century. Strongly influenced by the style of the "Two Wangs" (Wang Xizhi and Wang Xianzhi) of the Eastern Jin, Michikaze's running script brushwork combines the softer feel of the Jin while retaining the robustness of the Tang, though the variation of stroke thickness within single characters is less dynamic as classical brush techniques are not strictly adhered to. These modifications set the foundation of Japanese-style calligraphy (Wayō 和様, as opposed to Chinese-style calligraphy or Karayō 唐様), which was later refined by other two masters, Fujiwara no Sukemasa and Fujiwara no Yukinari. Wayō was accredited and practiced, as a pure Japanese art form, until the mid-19th century.

None of Michikaze's kana calligraphy is known to have survived. A number of extant kanji works are believed to be by Michikaze, but only a few are strongly attributed to him. One of the well-known works ascribed without much evidence to Michikaze is a draft for an inscription on a byoubu (Japanese folding screen) now mounted as a handscroll in the Tokyo Imperial Household collection. It was executed in semi-cursive script (gyōsho), and consisted of ten poems by Michikaze's contemporary Oe no Asatsuna. The same collection also has his other masterpieces, like the Gyokusen-Jo handscroll, presenting poems by a Tang Chinese poet. Michikaze also was given credit for many kohitsu-gire (famous calligraphic works) of the Heian era, among which a scroll containing forty-nine waka poems from the twelfth volume – "Poems of Love" – of the early-Heian poetry anthology, Kokin Wakashū. Among his last works are eleven letters, in one of which he bemoans the evanescence of life.

== Legend ==
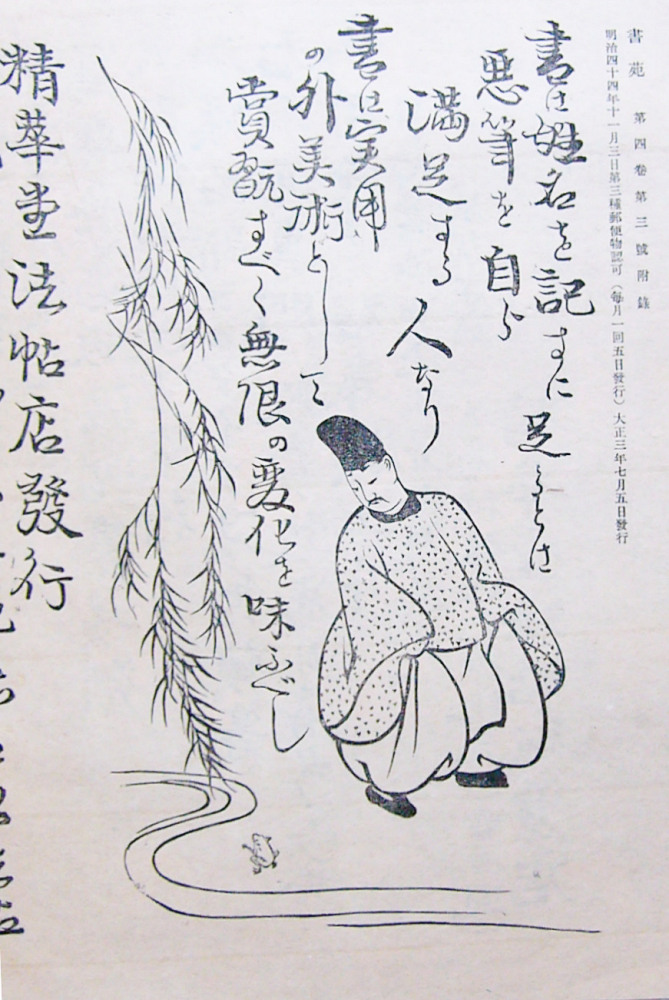
Ono no Michikaze and the frog

Michikaze became well known due to his depiction in Hanafuda cards. As the story goes, one day when Michikaze was feeling inadequate about his calligraphy he took a walk outside in the rain. Seeing a frog trying to jump on a willow branch, again and again missing its mark, he thought to himself "Stupid frog! No matter how many times you try you will never be able to reach the willow". Upon thinking this, the willow curved in a big breeze allowing the frog to jump onto the willow. Michikaze then realized "I myself am the stupid one. The frog created this chance with his determination. Up until now I haven't been as diligent as this frog". This story made him famous during the Edo period and earned him his place on the willow set in Hanafuda cards.

== Legacy ==
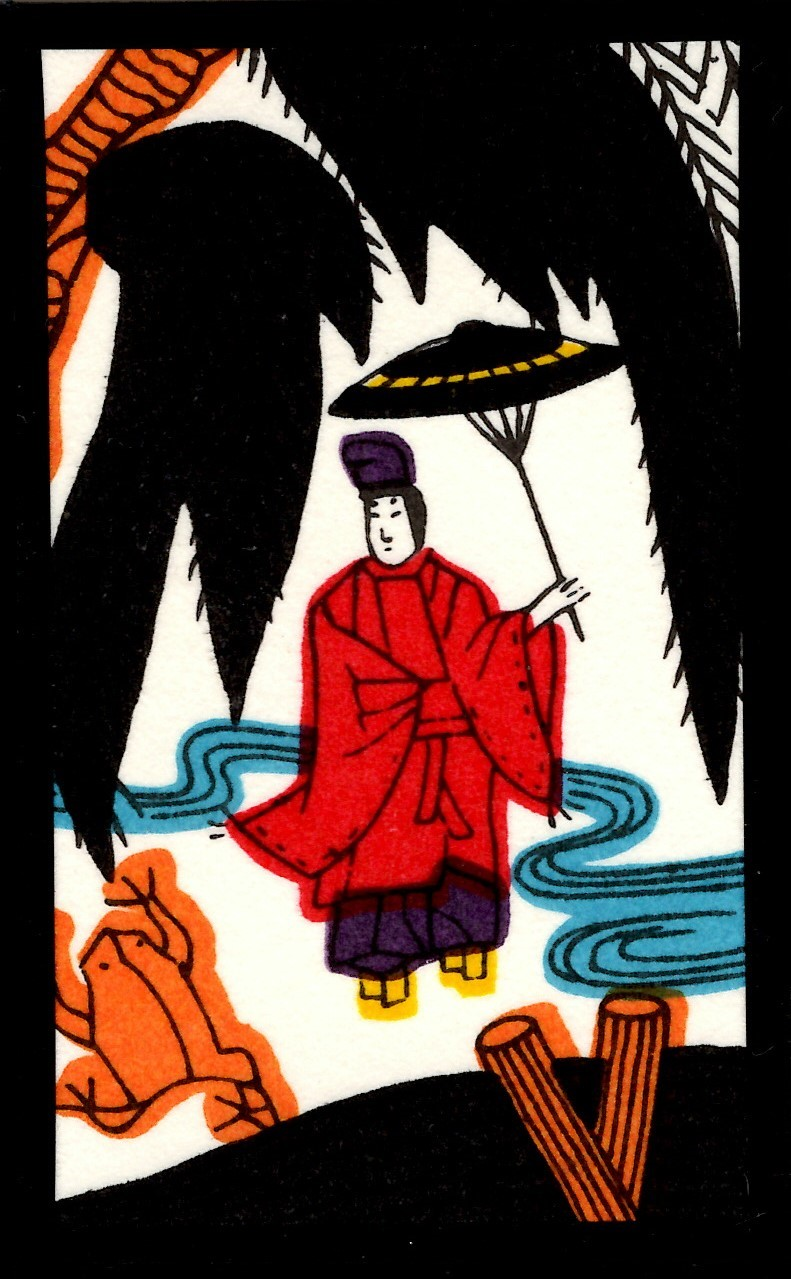
Ono no Michikaze and the frog on a Hanafuda playing card

- On 20 October 2000 (Heisei 12), an 80 yen "Willow and frog" postal stamp was issued, depicting Michikaze watching a leaping frog.
- Hanafuda cards depict Michikaze watching the leaping frog on a card in the suit of November. Michikaze is required to form the Ame-Shikō (雨四光) "Rainy Four Hikari" yaku.
- There is a shrine to his spirit in Kyoto, where his divine soul is considered to be protecting the women of the region in maternity.

== See also ==
- Japanese calligraphy
