= Tachibana no Hayanari =

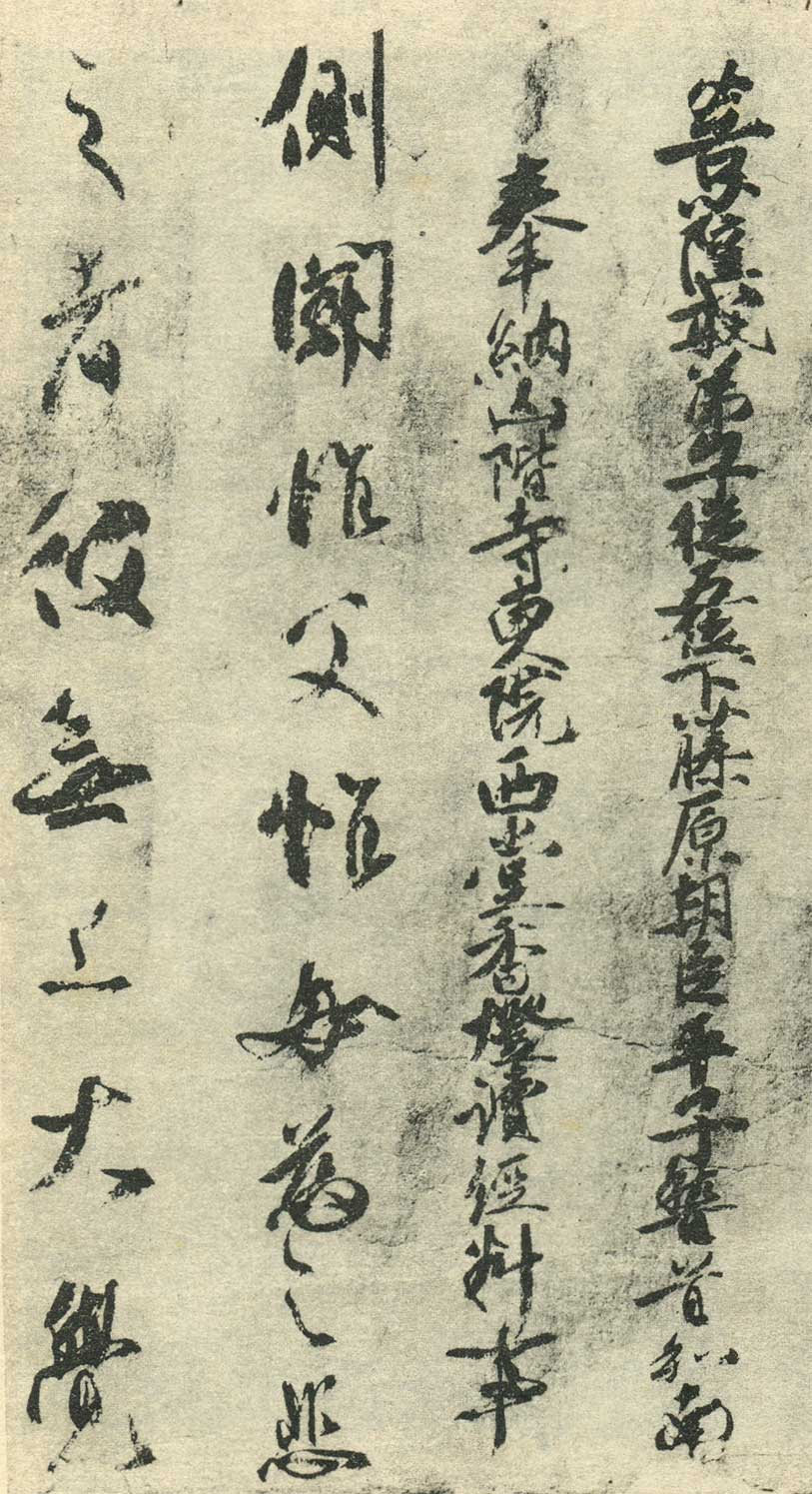
Ito Naishinnou Ganmon

Tachibana no Hayanari (橘 逸勢; 782 - September 24, 844) was a Heian period Japanese government official, calligrapher and member of the Tachibana family. He travelled to China in 804, returning in 806, and dying exiled in Izu Province for participation in an imperial succession controversy. His most famous calligraphic work is the Ito Naishin'no Ganmon (伊都内親王願文), now in the Imperial Household collection.

Tachibana is honored posthumously as one of the outstanding calligraphers called Sanpitsu (Three Brushes) and as a kami at Kami Goryo Shrine in Kyoto.
