= Fujiwara no Yukinari =

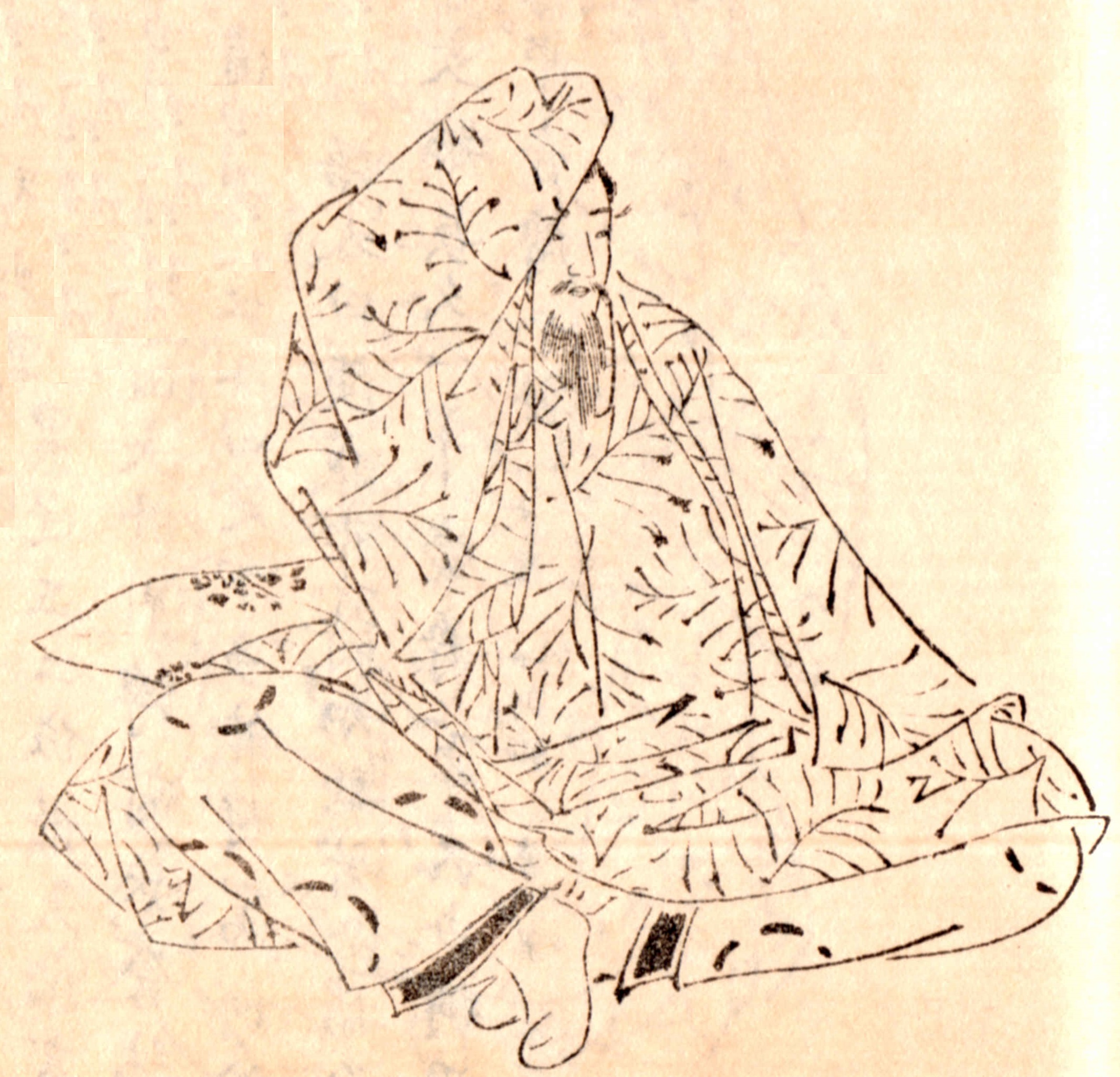
- Portrait by Kikuchi Yōsai
- Born: 972
- Died: 3 January 1028
- Occupation: Calligrapher
- Notable work: Three Brush Traces

Picture portrait of Fujiwara no Yukinari

Fujiwara no Yukinari or Kōzei (藤原 行成; Japanese pronunciation: [ɸɯ̈̀.(ɟ̟͡)ʑí.β̞ä́.ɾä́ nó̞ | jɨ̀.kí.nä̀.ɾʲï̀, -nó̞ jɨ́-, -nó̞ (|) kó̞ò̞.(d͡)zè̞ì, -(d͡)zè̞è̞]; 972 – January 3, 1028) was a Japanese calligrapher (shodoka) during the Heian period. He was memorialized for his prowess in his chosen art by being remembered as one of the outstanding Three Brush Traces (Sanseki 三跡), along with Ono no Michikaze and Fujiwara no Sukemasa.

== Life ==
Yukinari was the son of a courtier by the name of Fujiwara no Yoshitaka. After the early death of his father, he was raised by his grandfather, Prince Kanenori. Yukinari had a fairly successful career as a court official, where he served as a Major Counselor. Yukinari further improved the Japanese style calligraphy (wayō-shodō 和様書道), and showed great respect to its founder, Ono no Michikaze (894-966). He even mentioned in his diary, Gonki, that he had a dream wherein he met Michikaze and learnt calligraphy from him.

Yukinari was known as the master of kana. His style was mild and easily emulated, his lines were dainty and exquisite, resulting in highly elegant characters. Fujiwara Yukinari is regarded as the founder of the Sesonji lineage of calligraphy, which later became the leading tradition of wayō (和様) calligraphy. His extant works were most written in Mana (Chinese characters used as units of meaning) in Gyōsho or Sōsho.

== Works ==
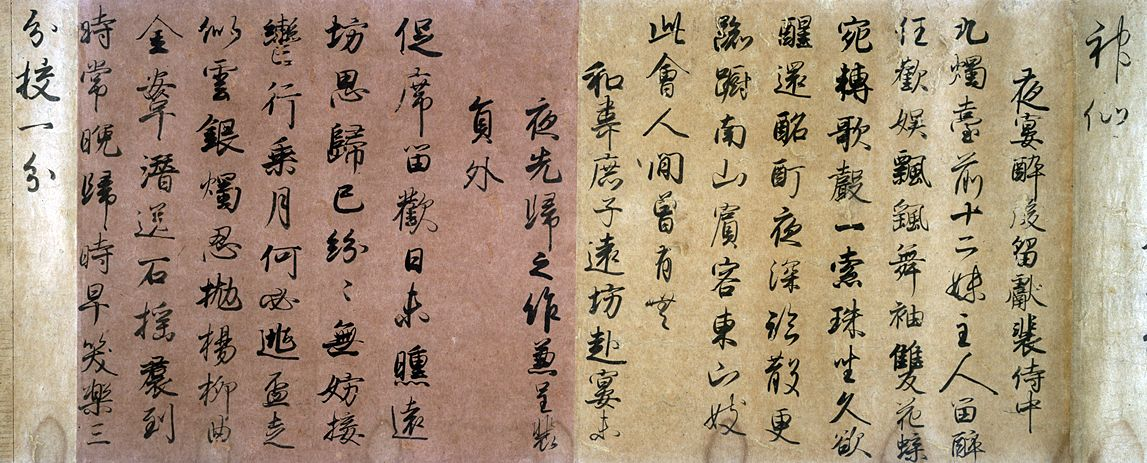
A part of Bai Juyi's eight poems

One of his most well-known works is the handscroll of Bai Juyi's eight poems from volume 65 of his Poetic Anthology. He wrote this masterpiece in 1018 when he was forty-seven years old. The scroll was made by joining together nine pieces of specially prepared paper known as ryoshi, then dyed in light brown, claret, and other shades. This handscroll was treasured by Emperor Fushimi (reigned from 1288 to 1298), and the colophon over the seams on the back of the paper attests to this. Currently, the scroll is stored in the Tokyo National Museum. He left a diary the gonki and a recently discovered book of Ceremonies for annual events called Sinsen Nenchugyoji.

== See also ==
- Shodo
- Calligraphy
