= Fujiwara no Sukemasa =

Japanese noble, statesman and calligrapher

Fujiwara no Sukemasa 藤原佐理
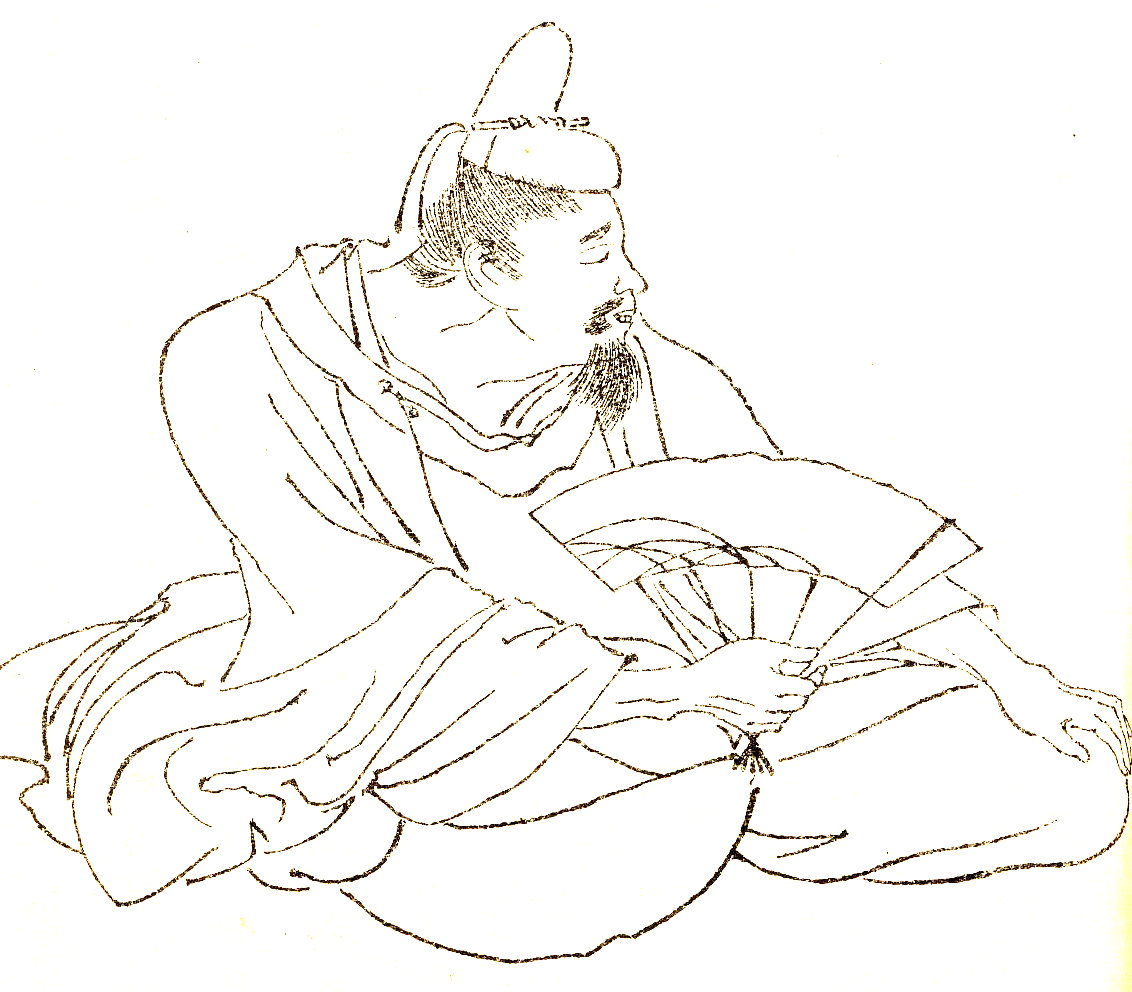
- Illustration by Kikuchi Yōsai, from Zenken Kojitsu
- Born: 944
- Died: August 19, 998
- Family: Fujiwara Hokke
- Father: Fujiwara no Atsutoshi (藤原敦敏)

Fujiwara no Sukemasa or Sari (藤原 佐理; Japanese pronunciation: [ɸɯ̈̀.(ɟ̟͡)ʑí.β̞ä́.ɾä́ nó̞ (|) sɨ̥.ké̞.mä̀.sä̀, -nó̞ (|) sä́.ɾʲì]; 944 – August 19, 998) was a Japanese noble, statesman, and renowned calligrapher of the middle Heian period. Grandson and adopted son of the daijō-daijin Fujiwara no Saneyori and son of major general of the imperial guard Fujiwara no Atsutoshi (藤原敦敏), he is honored as one of the Sanseki, a group of outstanding calligraphers.

== Life ==
In 961, Sukemasa was conferred the lower junior fifth rank (従五位下) and appointed as a chamberlain. He passed through two minor military positions until, in 967, his adoptive father Fujiwara no Saneyori was appointed as regent to the newly ascended Emperor Reizei. Sukemasa was promoted that year to upper junior fifth rank (従五位上), and again in 968 to lower senior fifth rank (正五位下).

In 969, Emperor En'yū ascended to the throne, and Sukemasa rose gradually as a benkan (弁官) in the Daijō-kan. In 978 he was promoted to sangi, joining the ranks of the kugyō, and in 984 gained the junior third rank (従三位).

In the following courts of Emperor Kazan and Emperor Ichijō, Sukemasa was repeatedly passed over for promotion in favor of Kazan's relative Fujiwara no Yoshichika and then Ichijō's relatives Fujiwara no Michitaka, Fujiwara no Michikane, and Fujiwara no Michinaga. In 991, he resigned his post as sangi and moved to Kyushu as vice-minister of the Dazaifu. In 992, he was promoted to the senior third rank (正三位).

Sukemasa died on August 19, 998, at the age of 55.

== Personality and anecdotes ==
Sukemasa was recognized for his excellent calligraphy early on and was particularly esteemed as the leading practitioner of cursive script. His work adorned the folding screens used at the daijō-e (大嘗会) feasts following the coronations of Emperors En'yū, Kazan, and Ichijō. He is counted among the Sanseki group of great calligraphers, along with Ono no Michikaze and Fujiwara no Yukinari, and his flowing and lively handwriting is known in Japanese as saseki (佐跡). Several examples of original notes he wrote remain, including the National Treasures of Japan Shikaishi (詩懐紙) and Rirakujō (離洛帖).

However, Sukemasa loved sake, and disgraced himself on numerous occasions. He was extremely neglectful of his duties and lacking in common sense, and the Ōkagami calls him a "slovenly man" (如泥人). That said, some of his documents as a sangi remain, and he did seem to have some views on ancient practices and customs, in which his family was well versed.

The Ōkagami contains two anecdotes about Sukemasa. In one, as Sukemasa returns to Kyōto from his assignment to Kyushu, he receives an oracle from Ōyamazumi Shrine in a dream and then writes down the shrine's motto on its gate. In the other, the regent Fujiwara no Michitaka commands Sukemasa to write a poem on a sliding screen for his new palace, but Sukemasa arrives late and ruins Michitaka's mood.

== Extant works ==
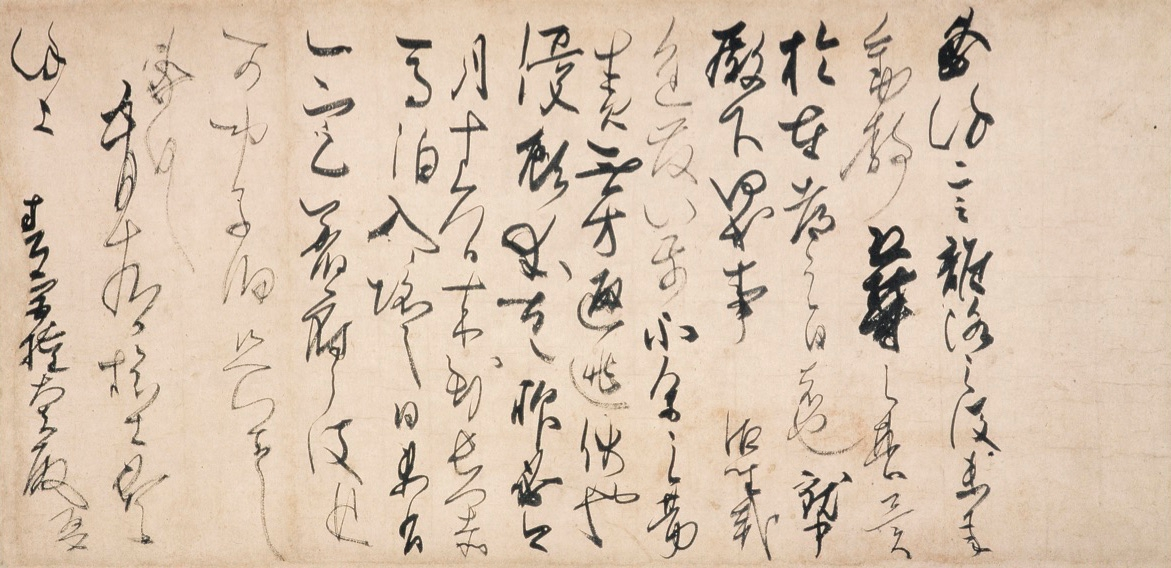
Letter (Rirakujō), national treasure, held by Hatakeyama Memorial Museum of Fine Art

- Shikaishi (詩懐紙), held by The Kagawa Museum – The term kaishi (懐紙) refers to kanshi or waka transcribed in a particular format. This is the only such work remaining from the Heian period.
- Rirakujō (離洛帖), held by the Hatakeyama Memorial Museum of Fine Art – Written in 991 as Sukemasa was en route to his assignment in Kyushu and suddenly remembered in Shimonoseki that he had forgotten to greet the regent Fujiwara no Michitaka before his departure. In this letter of apology, he asked his nephew Fujiwara no Sanenobu (藤原誠信) to smooth things out between them. The sense of speed in its cursive calligraphy style gives it a unique character.
- Onmeijō (恩命帖), held by the Museum of the Imperial Collections – a letter
- Kuni no Moushibumi-jō (国申文帖), held by the Shogei Bunka-in (書芸文化院) – Written in 982 while Sukemasa was serving as governor of Iyo Province, this was a letter of apology addressed to the regent Fujiwara no Yoritada via his household steward. Sukemasa apologizes for neglecting his paperwork, leaving the New Year's banquet before Yoritada himself, and failing to attend Yoritada's daughter Junshi's wedding to Emperor En'yū.
- Kyokajō (去夏帖) – a letter
- Tōbenjō (頭弁帖), held by the Fukuyama Museum of Calligraphy (ふくやま書道美術館蔵) – a letter

== Genealogy ==
- Father: Fujiwara no Atsutoshi (藤原敦敏)
- Mother: daughter of Fujiwara no Motona (藤原元名)
- Wife: Fujiwara no Toshiko (藤原淑子), daughter of Fujiwara no Tamesuke (藤原為輔)
  - Son: Fujiwara no Yorifusa (藤原頼房)
  - Daughter: wife of Fujiwara no Kanehira (藤原懐平)
