= Sanseki =

Three famous Heian period calligraphers

The term Sanseki (三跡) or "three [brush] traces" is used in Japanese to refer to a group of three famous Heian period calligraphers:

- Ono no Michikaze, known as Yaseki from the character 野 in his name.
- Fujiwara no Yukinari, known as Gonseki from 権 in his court title.
- Fujiwara no Sukemasa, known as Saseki from the character 佐 in his name.

Sanseki (三石) or "three stones" is used in the game of Go to mean a three-stone advantage.

== See also ==
- Sanpitsu, a similar group of renowned calligraphers
