= Sokuhi Nyoitsu =

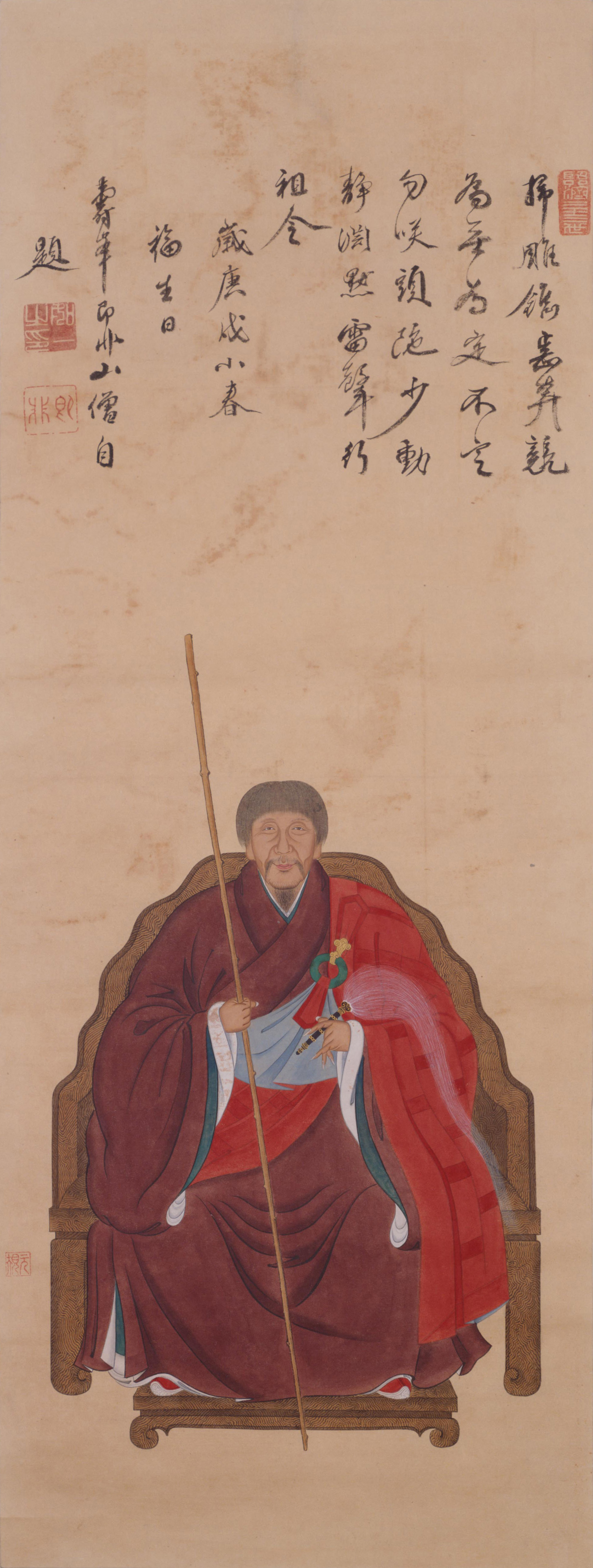
Portrait of Sokuhi Nyoitsu (Sōfuku-ji)

Sokuhi Nyoitsu (即非如一, pinyin Jifei Ruyi; (1616–1671)) was a Buddhist monk of the Ōbaku Zen sect, and was also an accomplished poet and calligrapher. His teacher Ingen Ryūki, Mokuan Shōtō and Sokuhi were together known as the "Three Brushes of Ōbaku" or Ōbaku no Sanpitsu.

== China ==
Sokuhi was born in Fuzhou, Fujian, Southeast China. He was born into a declining Confucian scholar gentry family of the Chen clan. Life became difficult for him and his mother after his father died. He was ordained at 17 by Feiyin Tongrong. At 21 he became a disciple of Ingen, abbot of Wanfu Temple, Mount Huangbo, Fujian. There he became a colleague of Muyan. In 1651 he nearly died due to asphyxiation while fighting a forest fire near the temple, and was suddenly enlightened. Sokuhi received dharma transmission from Ingen and the next year received a promotion to high monastic office. He then became abbot of Chongsheng Temple on Mount Xuefeng, also in Fujian.

== Japan ==
In 1654, Ingen and Mu'an travelled to Japan and summoned Sokuhi, who followed them to Nagasaki in 1657. Sokuhi was made abbot of Sōfuku-ji, a Chinese temple built in 1629, and Mu'an was serving as abbot of Fukusai-ji. The two became known as nikanromon ("two gates to enlightenment"). In 1663 Sokuhi met Ingen for the first time in 12 years, after he received permission to go to Uji where he was abbot of Manpuku-ji. In 1664 Sokuhi left for Nagasaki intending to return to China but was convinced to stay by lord of Kokura and found a new temple Fukuju-ji on Mount Kujū (now in Fukuoka). In 1668 he passed this position to his Japanese disciple Houn Myodo and returned to Sōfuku-ji to retire. He became ill in 1670 and died at Nagasaki in 1671. He was cremated and his remains were placed at Fukuju-ji and Sōfuku-ji.

== See also ==
- Japanese Buddhism
- Ōbaku
