= Itsunen Shoyu =

Chinese Buddhist monk (1601–1668)

- Title: Ch'an master

Personal life
- Born: 1601 Hangzhou, Zhejiang, China
- Died: 1668 (aged 66–67) Nagasaki, Japan

Religious life
- Religion: Buddhism
- School: Ch'an
- Lineage: Ōbaku

Itsunen Shoyu (Chinese: 逸然性融, 1601 in Hangzhou, Zhejiang, China – 1668 in Nagasaki, Japan) is famous as a Buddhist monk and painter who helped to establish Chan (Zen) in Japan. He was also the third abbot of Kofukuji Temple. In addition to his skill of painting, he also practices the art of Seal carving and cemented the popularity of this art in Japan.

In 1642 he travelled to Nagasaki as a trader in Chinese medicine, and in 1644 entered Kofukuji Temple, becoming its 3rd abbot in 1645. Established by monks immigrated from China, the temple was then a base of the Ōbaku school of Zen Buddhism in Japan. In 1654 after multiple requests he succeeded in persuading Yinyuan Longqi (Ingen Ryuki), the 33rd abbot of Wanfu Temple (Mount Huangbo, Fujian) to emigrate to Japan, where he founded Ōbaku, the third and final major Japanese Zen sect.

Itsunen was a talented late Ming style painter of Buddhist figural subjects, and is known to have copied works by Chen Xian brought to Japan by Yinyuan Longqi.

== See also ==
- Japanese Buddhism
- Zen
