= Fukusai-ji =

Buddhist temple in Nagasaki Prefecture, Japan

Fukusai-ji 福済寺
- Kannon riding atop a spirit turtle

Religion
- Affiliation: Ōbaku

Location
- Location: 2-56 Chikugomachi, Nagasaki, Nagasaki Prefecture
- Country: Japan
- Interactive map of Fukusai-ji 福済寺
- Coordinates: 32°45′13″N 129°52′29″E

Architecture
- Founder: Kakukai (Juehai)
- Completed: 1628

Fukusai-ji (福済寺) is an Ōbaku Zen temple in Nagasaki, Nagasaki, Japan. Its honorary sangō prefix is Bunshizan (分紫山).

== History ==
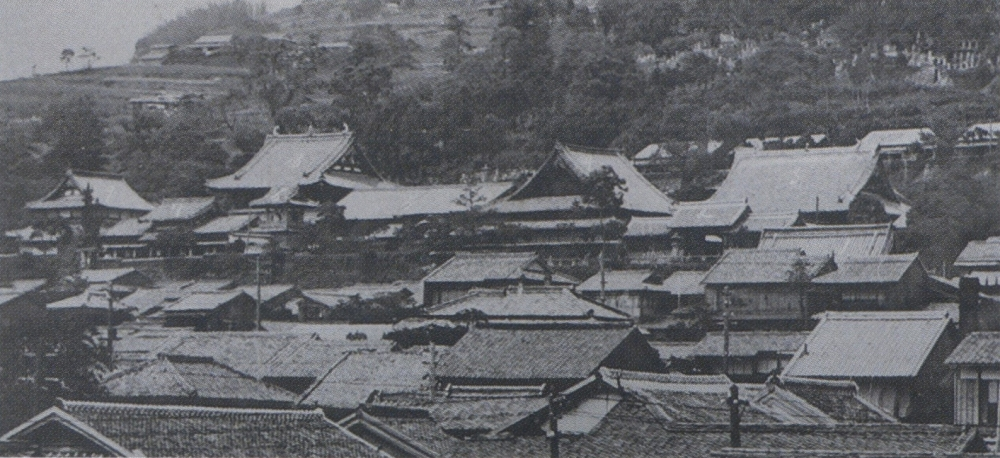
A view of Fukusai-ji from 1924.

=== Original temple ===
The first temple built in Nagasaki was Kofukuji, built in 1623 by traders from the northern provinces of China, such as Jiangsu and Zhejiang. Fukusai-ji, the second temple, was founded in 1628 by members of the Nagasaki Chinese community, predominantly merchants from Southern Fujian and their families.

The temple was built partially in response to the implementation of the anti-Christian motivated tearuke system that required citizens registered to prove their affiliation with a Buddhist temple. Temples would issue certificates that members were not Christian and, because of the long history of Christianity in Nagasaki specifically, the system was first implemented in Kyushu and Kyoto in 1638. The temple was built in part by the desire of the Chinese community to confirm that they were not Christian while maintaining a separate place of worship. The nearby Sōfuku-ji was constructed a few years later by the Northern Fujian community in 1632.

The monk Mu'an (木庵性瑫,1611-1684), the disciple of Ingen, became the abbot of Fukusai-ji in 1655 and remained in Nagasaki until 1660.

=== Nuclear bombing and rebuilding ===
In 1910, the main hall of the temple was designated as a National Treasure of Japan. The temple was completely destroyed in the atomic bombing of Nagasaki on 9 August 1945 at 11:02 am. It was subsequently rebuilt in 1979 with an 18-meter aluminium alloy statue of Kannon, the Bodhisattva of compassion, standing atop a spirit turtle. Inside is a Foucault pendulum which swings over the remains of 16,500 Japanese killed during World War II and in the atomic bombing of the city. At 25 meters, it is one of the largest Foucault pendulums in Japan.

In honor of the victims of the atomic bomb, a bell is rung at 11:02 am each day.
