= Fukugon-ji (Yanagawa) =

Buddhist temple in Yanagawa, Japan

Fukugon-ji 福厳寺
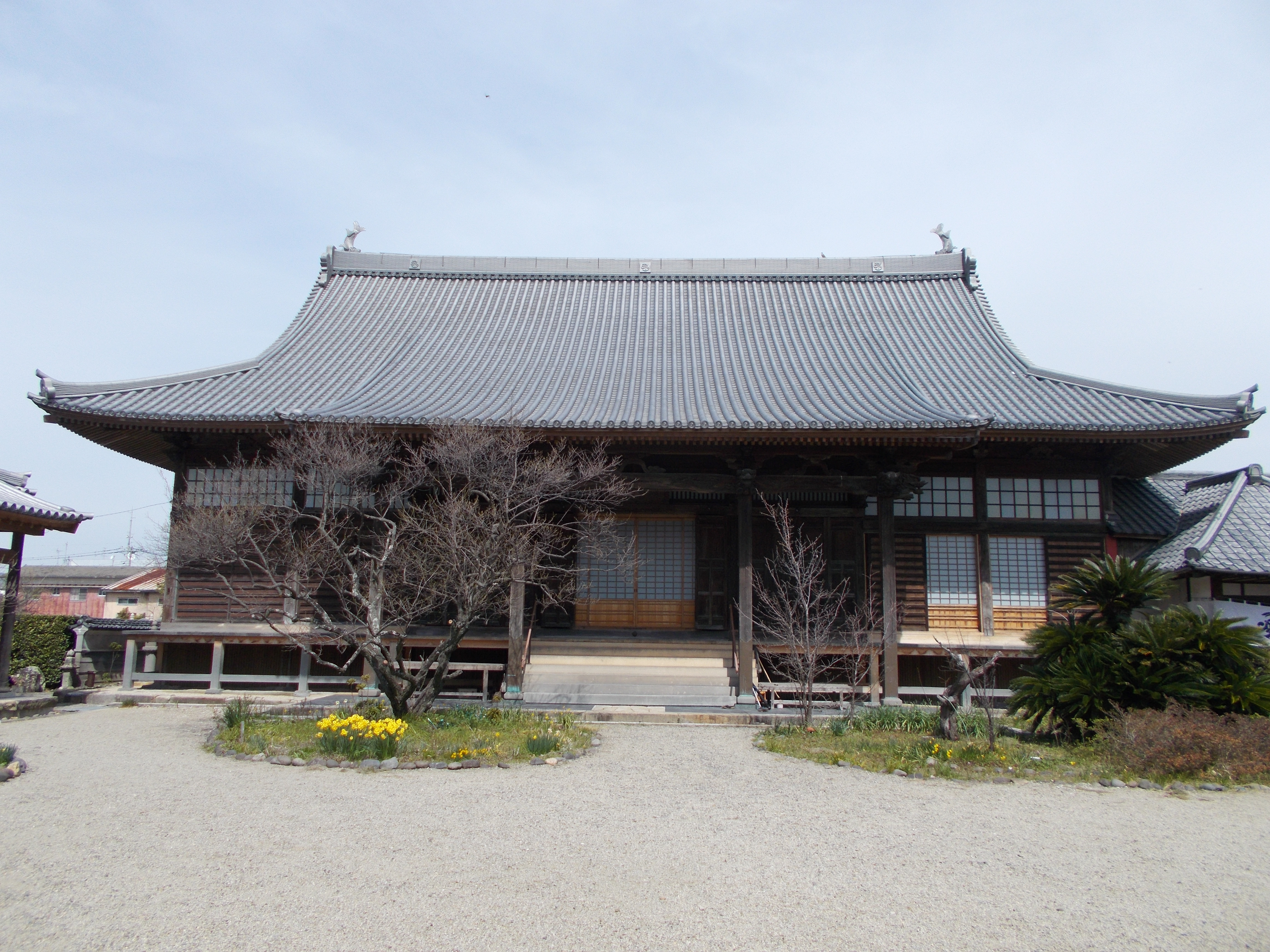
- Main Hall

Religion
- Affiliation: Zen
- Deity: Shaka Nyorai (Śākyamuni)

Location
- Location: 32-1 Ōshūmachi, Yanagawa, Fukuoka Prefecture
- Country: Japan
- Interactive map of Fukugon-ji 福厳寺
- Coordinates: 33°9′31.4″N 130°24′19.69″E

Architecture
- Founder: Tachibana Muneshige
- Completed: 1587

Fukugon-ji (福厳寺) is an Ōbaku Zen temple in Yanagawa, Fukuoka, Japan. Its honorary sangō prefix is Baigakuzan (梅岳山).

== History ==
The temple was originally located in Shingū and called Tachibanazan Baigaku-ji (立花山梅岳寺), a Sōtō temple. In 1587, however, Tachibana Muneshige who was granted the three districts of Chikugo Province, Yamato, Shimotsuma and Mizuma and built a castle in Yanagawa, started to move to the present location.

It was originally a Sōtō temple, but in 1669, Tachibana Tadashige, the third lord of Yanagawa Domain, has been converted to the Ōbaku school temple. Tadashige invited Tetsumon Dōchi, the elder son of Mu'an and changed the name to Fukugon-ji. It later became the Tachibana clan's funeral temple and all nine of the Tachibana families are buried here.

There is a cemetery in the back of the main hall, and the graves of some famous novelists such as Ken Hase, Kazuo Dan etc.
