= Tetsugen Doko =

Japanese Zen Master

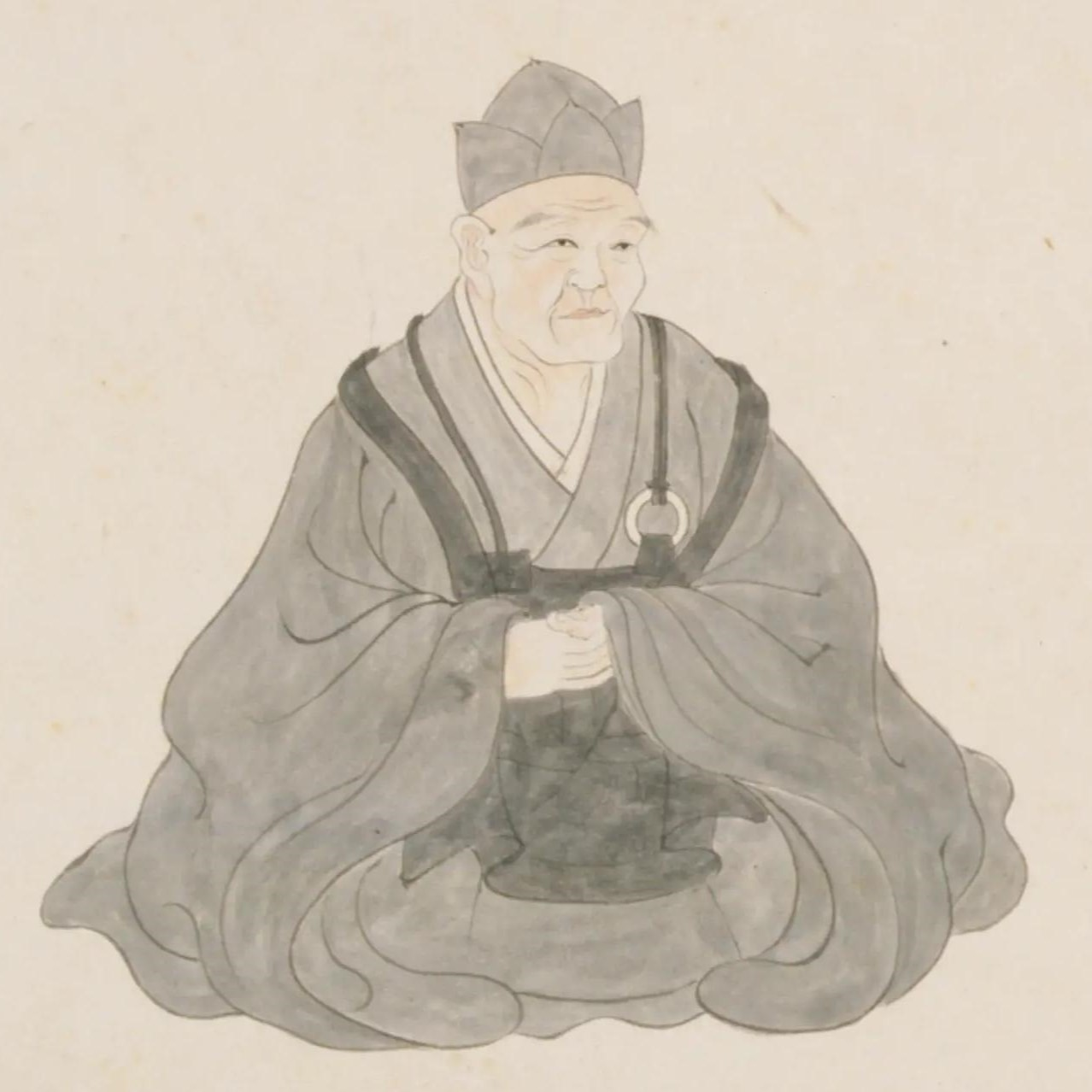
- Title: Zen Master

Personal life
- Born: 1630 Higo Province, Japan
- Died: 1682 (aged 51–52)

Religious life
- Religion: Zen Buddhism
- School: Obaku

Tetsugen Dōkō (鉄眼道光 1630–1682) was a Japanese Zen Master, and an important early leader of the Ōbaku school of Buddhism.

Tetsugen was born in the seventh year of the Kan'ei era (1630) in Higo Province. He became a priest of the Jodo Shinshu sect at the age of 13. When Ingen came to Japan, Tetsugen became his follower in the Ōbaku school.

In 1681, Tetsugen oversaw the production of the first complete woodcut edition (consisting of around 60,000 pieces) of the Chinese Buddhist sutras in Japan.

Tetsugen died at the age of 53 in the second year of the Tenna era (1682). The anniversary of Tetsugen's birth is celebrated on January 1 in the Western calendar.

== Tetsugen and the Sutras ==
The following story is told of Tetsugen's efforts to publish the sutras.

Tetsugen decided to publish the sutras, which at that time were available only in Chinese. The books were to be printed with wood blocks in an edition of seven thousand copies, a tremendous undertaking.

Tetsugen began by travelling and collecting donations for this purpose. A few sympathizers would give him a hundred pieces of gold, but most of the time he received only small coins. He thanked each donor with equal gratitude. After ten years Tetsugen had enough money to begin his task.

It happened that at that time the Uji River overflowed. Famine followed. Tetsugen took the funds he had collected for the books and spent them to save others from starvation. Then he began again his work of collecting.

Several years afterward an epidemic spread over the country. Tetsugen again gave away what he had collected.

For a third time he started his work, and after twenty years his wish was fulfilled. The printing blocks which produced the first edition of sutras can be seen today in Ōbaku monastery in Kyoto.

The Japanese tell their children that Tetsugen made three sets of sutras, and that the first two invisible sets surpass even the last.

== Bibliography ==
- Baroni, HJ (1994). Bottled Anger: Episodes in Ōbaku Conflict in the Tokugawa Period, Japanese Journal of Religious Studies 21/2-3, 191-210
