= Kazuo Dan =

Japanese novelist and poet (1912–1976)

- 檀 一雄
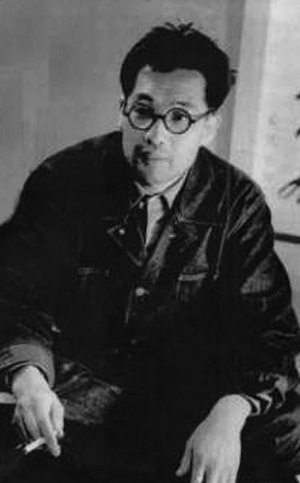
- Born: 13 February 1912; Tsuru, Yamanashi, Japan
- Died: 2 January 1976 (aged 63); Fukuoka, Japan
- Occupations: novelist, journalist, poet
- Writing career
- Language: Japanese
- Movement: Buraiha

Kazuo Dan (檀 一雄, Dan Kazuo; February 3, 1912 – January 2, 1976) was a Japanese novelist and poet.

== Biography ==
Dan was born in what is now part of Tsuru, Yamanashi Prefecture, to a family originally from Kyūshū. His father's work required frequent changes of residence, so Dan grew up with his grandparents in Yanagawa from age 6 onwards. His parents were divorced when Dan was nine, and he subsequently moved to live with his father in Ashikaga, Tochigi Prefecture, where he led a solitary life, walking over hills and fields. In 1928, at age 16, he entered Fukuoka City High School, where he began his literary life by publishing poems, novels and plays in the school magazine. In 1932, he entered the Tokyo Imperial University from which he received a degree in economics.

After graduation, Dan dedicated himself entirely to writing, and in 1944 won the Noma Prize while serving as a newspaper war correspondent. Returning to Japan at the end of World War II, he married his wife Yosoko in Yanagawa. They moved to Tokyo, where he resumed his literary activities and won the prestigious 1950 Naoki Prize. During his career, he wrote novels and poetry, and traveled extensively in Japan, Europe, the United States, China, Russia, Australia and New Zealand. He lived in Santa Cruz on the seacoast west of Torres Vedras, Portugal, from 1971 to 1972 in a house on a street that now bears his name, Rua Professor Kazuo Dan, Nº 6. After his return to Japan, he retired to the island of Nokonoshima, Fukuoka Prefecture. He died from cancer in the Kyushu University Hospital. His grave is at the Buddhist temple of Fukugon-ji in Yanagawa, Fukuoka.

Dan received the 1975 Yomiuri Prize for Kataku no hito. There is a monument to Dan's memory in Santa Cruz, and another on Nokonoshima Island. In addition, his poetry is engraved on stone alongside the canals of Yanagawa.

His daughter is the actress Fumi Dan.
