= Wanfu Temple =

Buddhist temple in Fujian, China

- 万福寺
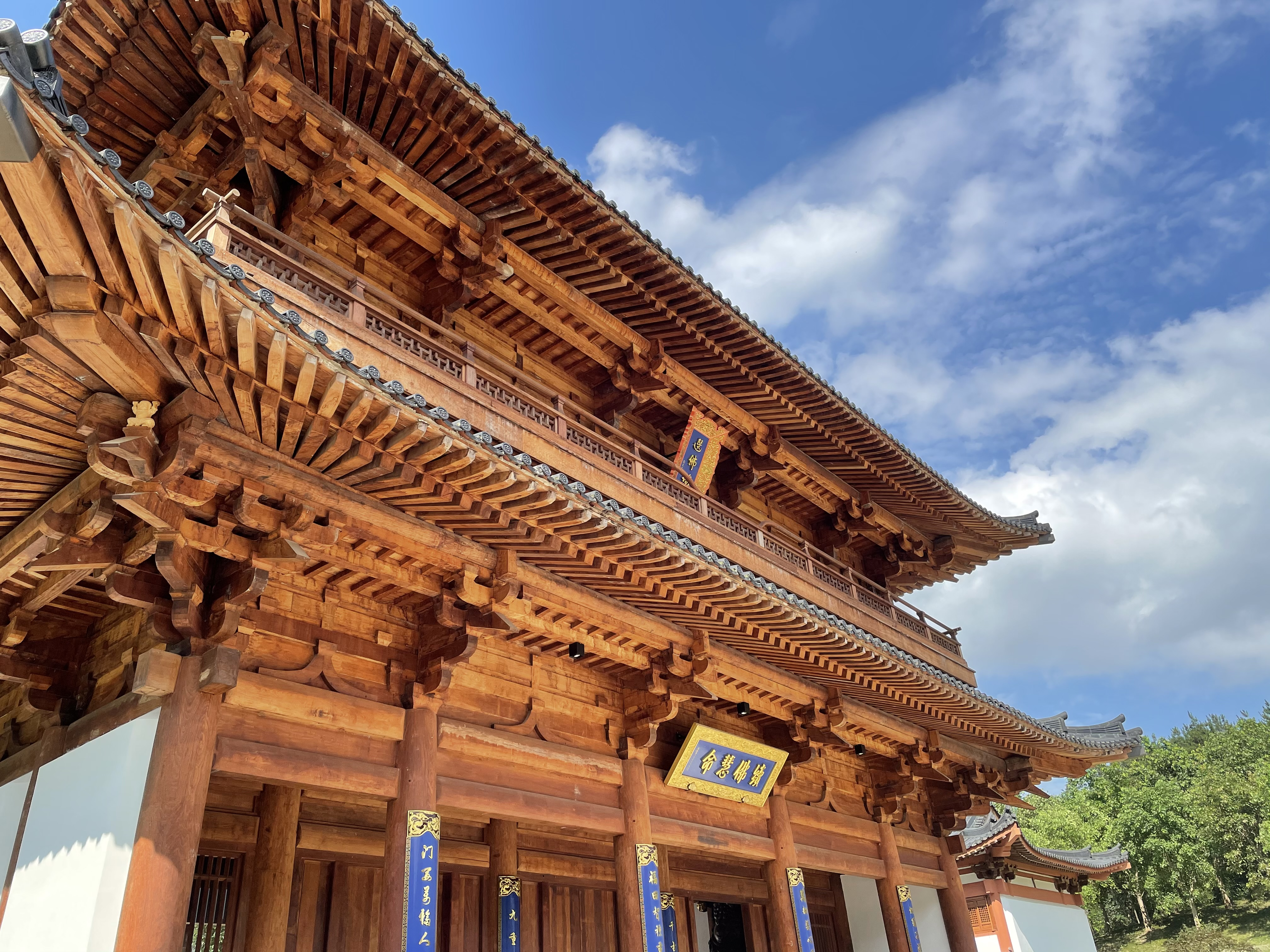

- Location within Fujian

Religion
- Affiliation: Buddhism
- Sect: Linji school

Location
- Location: Mount Huangbo, Fuqing, Fujian
- Country: China
- Interactive map of Wanfu Temple
- Coordinates: 25°38′46″N 119°15′49″E

Architecture
- Style: Chinese architecture
- Founder: Zhenggan (正干)
- Established: 789
- Completed: 1989–1997 (reconstruction)

Wanfu Temple (simplified Chinese: 万福寺; traditional Chinese: 萬福寺; pinyin: Wànfú Sì) is a Buddhist temple on Mount Huangbo in Fuqing, Fujian, China. It is famous as the original temple of Yinyuan Longqi, the temple's 33rd abbot and a Chan master. He later travelled to Japan with his disciple Muyan to found the Japanese Ōbaku school of Zen.

Found in 789 by Chan master Zhenggan (正干) in the Tang dynasty (618–907), it was destroyed and rebuilt several times. A modern restoration of the entire temple complex was carried out in 1989 and again in 2016.

Mampuku-ji, head temple of the Ōbaku school, is named after this temple.

== History ==
=== Tang dynasty ===
The temple was first built by Chan master Zhenggan (正干) in 789 in the Tang dynasty (618–907) with the name of Boruo Hall or Bore Hall (般若堂). It was enlarged as a temple eight years later. Zhenggan was a disciple of the Six Patriarch of Chan Buddhism Huineng.

In 848, Huangbo Xiyun received ordination as a monk in the temple. After gaining skills and qualifications under Baizhang Huaihai, he returned to Wanfu Temple to taught Chan Buddhism.

=== Song dynasty ===
During the Shaoxing period (1131–1162) in the Song dynasty (960–1279), Chan master Shanguo (善果) moved to Wanfu Temple from Miyin Temple, Hunan, where he promulgated Buddhist doctrines and delivered Buddhist precepts for over ten years.

=== Ming dynasty ===
In the 23rd year of Hongwu period in the Ming dynasty (1368–1644), namely 1390, under the support of Zhou Xinjian (周心鉴), monk Daxiu (大休) restored the temple on the original site.

Wanfu Temple was completely destroyed in the battles between Japanese pirates and Ming army. It was subsequently rebuilt by Sun Jianyuan (孙鉴源) and Sun Jingyuan (孙镜源) in the late 17th century. The emperor inscribed and honored the name "Wanfu Chan Temple" (万福禅寺), which is still in use now.

In 1637, Yinyuan Longqi was unanimously chosen as the new abbot. He raised funds to establish more than 30 halls and rooms, including the Shanmen, Mahavira Hall, Dharma Hall, Bell tower, Drum tower, etc.

=== Qing dynasty ===
In 1654, in the 11th year of Shunzhi period of the Qing dynasty (1644–1911), under the invitation of Japanese monks, Yinyuan Longqi led monks to go to the east Japan to preach Buddhism. His disciple Xingpei (性沛) replaced him as the new abbot.

During the reign of Qianlong Emperor, monk Qingfu (清馥) renovated and refurbished the temple.

=== Republic of China ===
In 1928, a disastrous flood struck the temple and destroyed most of the temple buildings.

=== People's Republic of China ===
In 1949, the year of the defeat of the Communists over the Nationalists in the Chinese Civil War, the whole Wanfu Temple went up into flames in a catastrophic fire. All of the cultural relics, scriptures, historical documents, and other works of art were damaged or destroyed in the disaster. Dharma Hall and Abbot's Room were rebuilt in 1957.

In 1979, a Japanese visiting mission led by Yoshii Shimamine (吉井鸠峰) came to the site to worship the cradle of Japanese Ōbaku school of Zen.

Wanfu Temple was designated as a National Key Buddhist Temple in Han Chinese Area by the State Council of China in 1983.

In April 1989, the reconstruction project of the temple was launched. The reconstruction took 8 years, and lasted from 1989 to 1997. On December 8, 1997, the newly established temple was consecrated by eminent monks.

In 2016, Cao Dewang, a well-known entrepreneur in China, donated 250 million yuan (38.4 million U.S. dollars) to redecorate Wanfu Temple.

== Architecture ==
The extant buildings were built between 1989 and 1997, which were modeled the traditional architectural style of the Ming and Qing dynasties. The complex include the following halls: Shanmen, Mahavira Hall, Tianwang-dian, Bell tower, Drum tower, Zushi-dian, Fatang, Memorial Hall of Yinyuan Longqi, etc.
