= Ōbaku no Sanpitsu =

Group of three famous Chinese calligraphers

Ōbaku no Sanpitsu (黄檗三筆) is a name given to a group of three famous Chinese calligraphers who lived in Japan:

- Ingen Ryūki, 隱元隆琦 1592–1673
- Mokuan Shōtō,木庵性瑫 1611–1684
- Sokuhi Nyoitsu, 即非如一 1616–1671

They are all connected with the Ōbaku school of Zen Buddhism. Analogous groups of famous calligraphers include the Sanseki and Sanpitsu.
