= Fukuju-ji (Kitakyushu) =

Buddhist temple in Fukuoka, Japan

Fukuju-ji 福聚寺
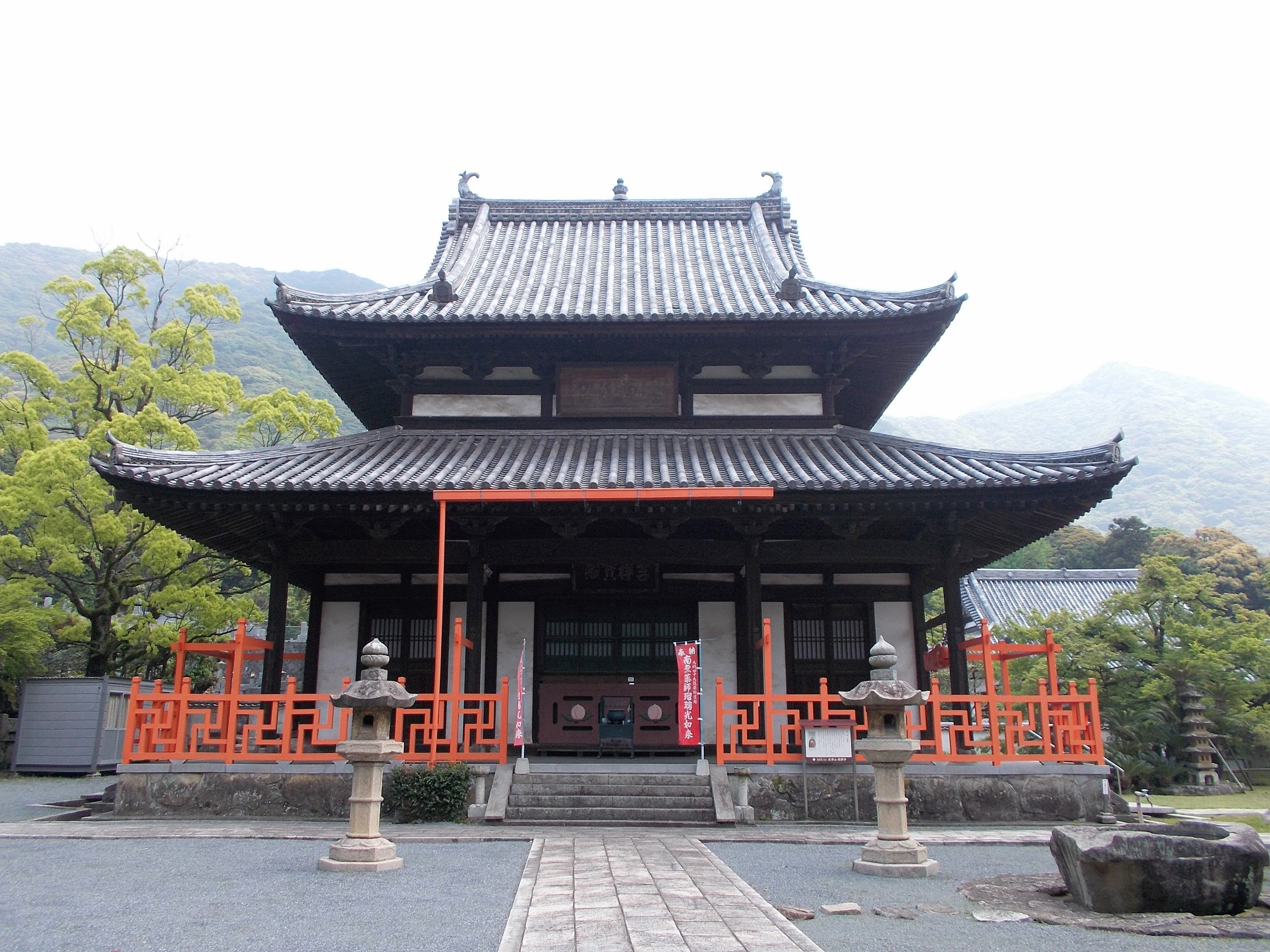
- Main Hall

Religion
- Affiliation: Zen
- Deity: Shaka Nyorai (Śākyamuni)

Location
- Location: 6-7 Juzancho, Kokurakita-ku, Kitakyūshū, Fukuoka Prefecture
- Country: Japan
- Interactive map of Fukuju-ji 福聚寺
- Coordinates: 33°52′13.11″N 130°54′10.49″E

Architecture
- Founder: Ogasawara Tadazane, Sokuhi Nyoitsu
- Completed: 1665

Fukuju-ji (福聚寺) is an Ōbaku Zen temple in Kokurakita-ku, Kitakyūshū, Fukuoka, Japan. Its honorary sangō prefix is Kōjuzan (広寿山). Fukuju-ji is one of two bodaiji (菩提寺), or funeral temples, dedicated to Ogasawara Tadazane, the first daimyō of Kokura Domain. (The other is Toyokawa's Rinzai-ji.)

== History ==
The temple was founded in 1665 by Ogasawara Tadazane with support from Sokuhi Nyoitsu, a Chinese monk. In 1669, Ogasawara Tadataka (小笠原忠雄), the second daimyō of Kokura, began planning the construction of the temple such as Kaisandō hall, the main hall, a bell tower and so on.

Many temple structures were destroyed by fire in the Summer War of 1866. However, much of the temple and its numerous annexes, including the Buddha-Hall (仏殿, butsuden), the Chinese style architecture rebuilt in 1802, survived after the war.

== Gallery ==
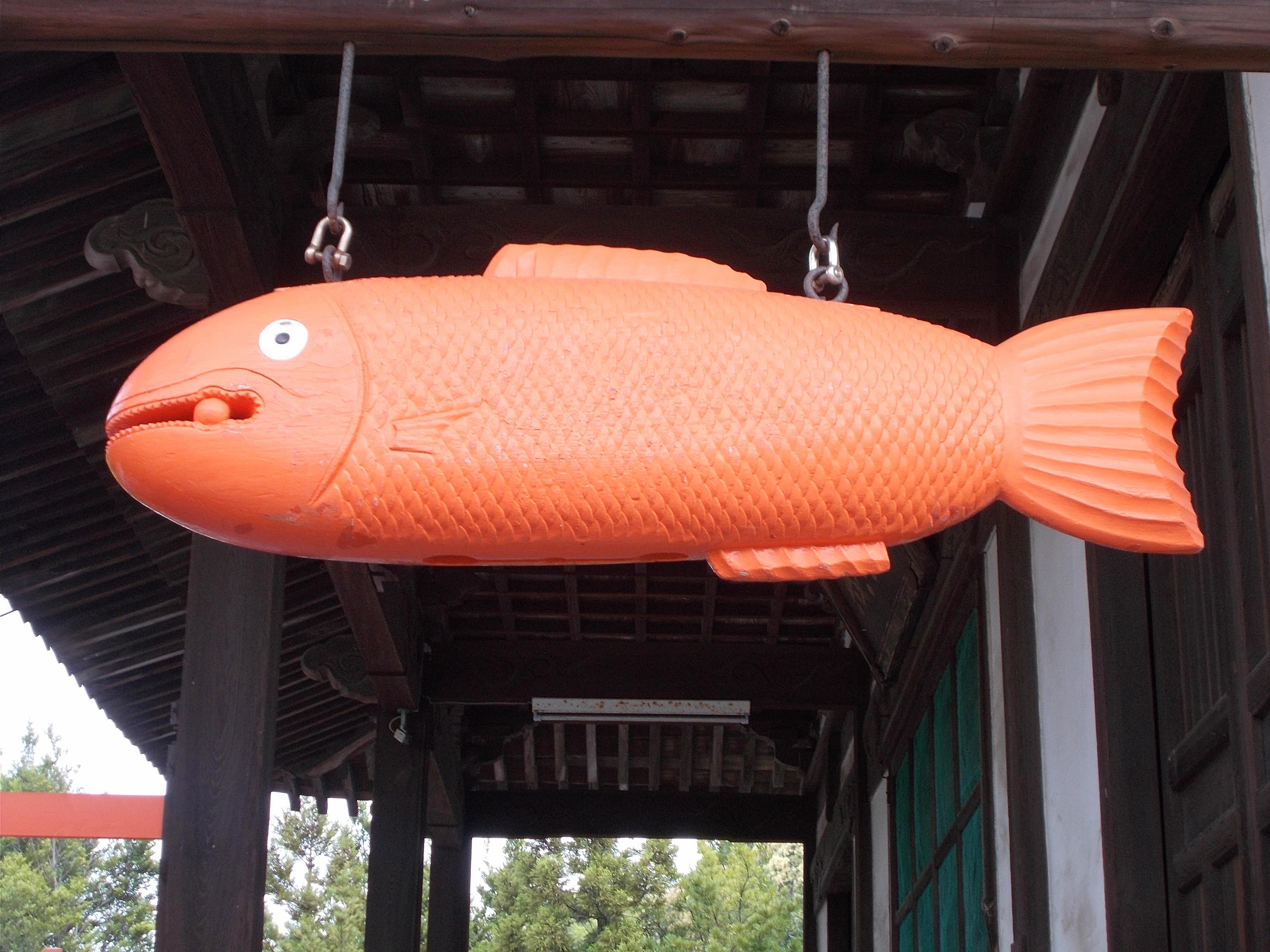
Gyoban (fish board)

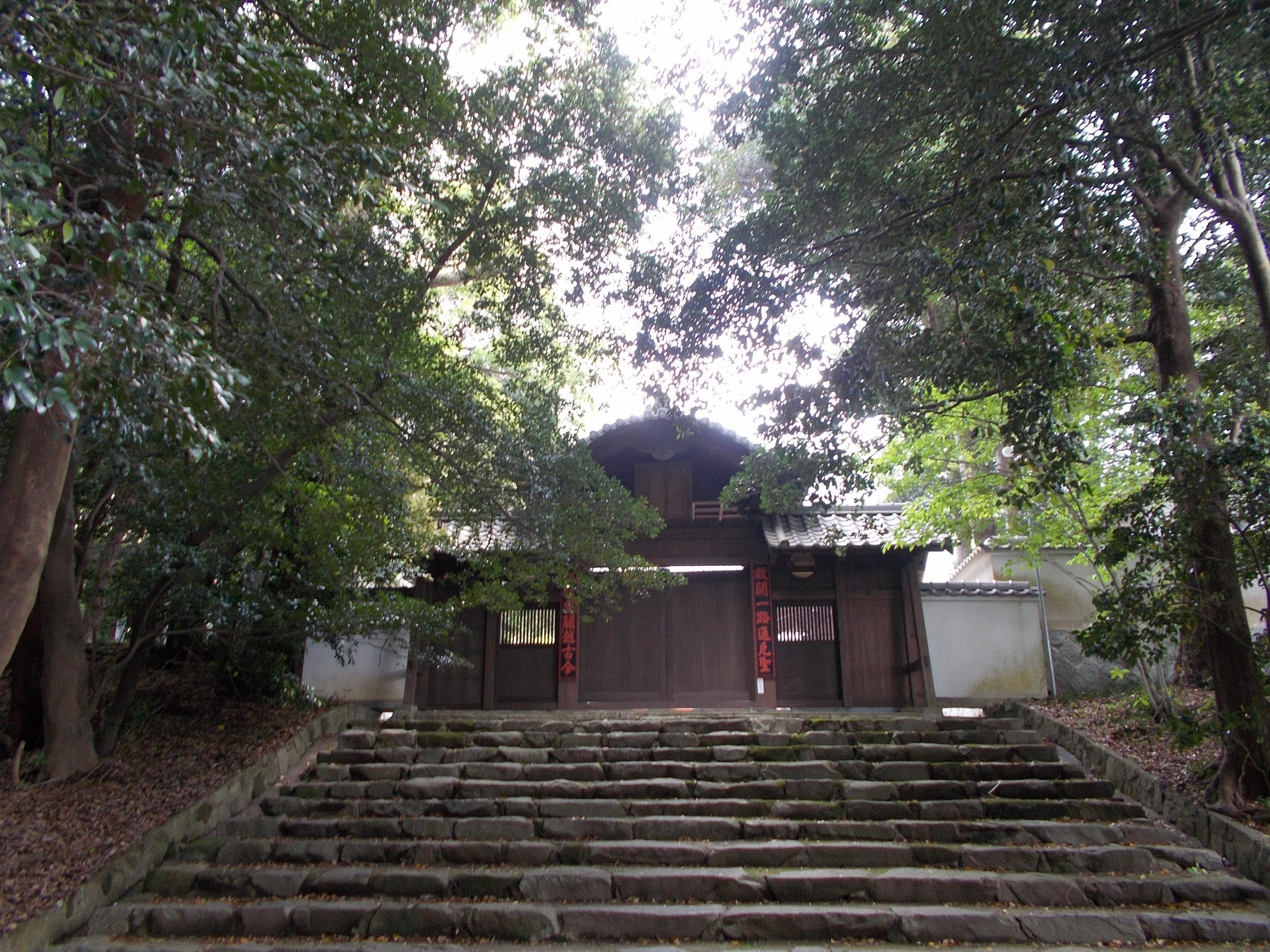
Sanmon

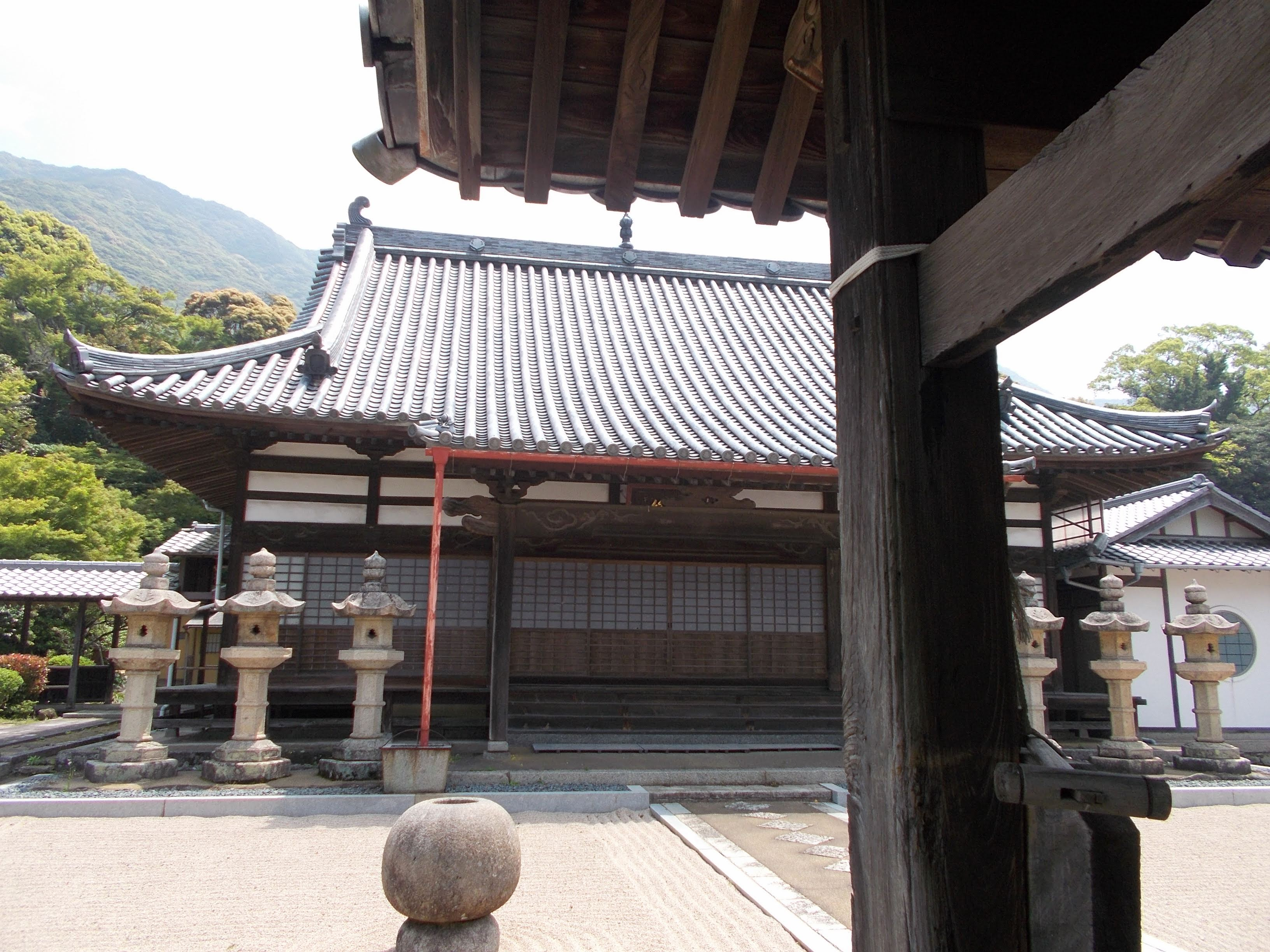
The Mausoleum of Ogasawara clan

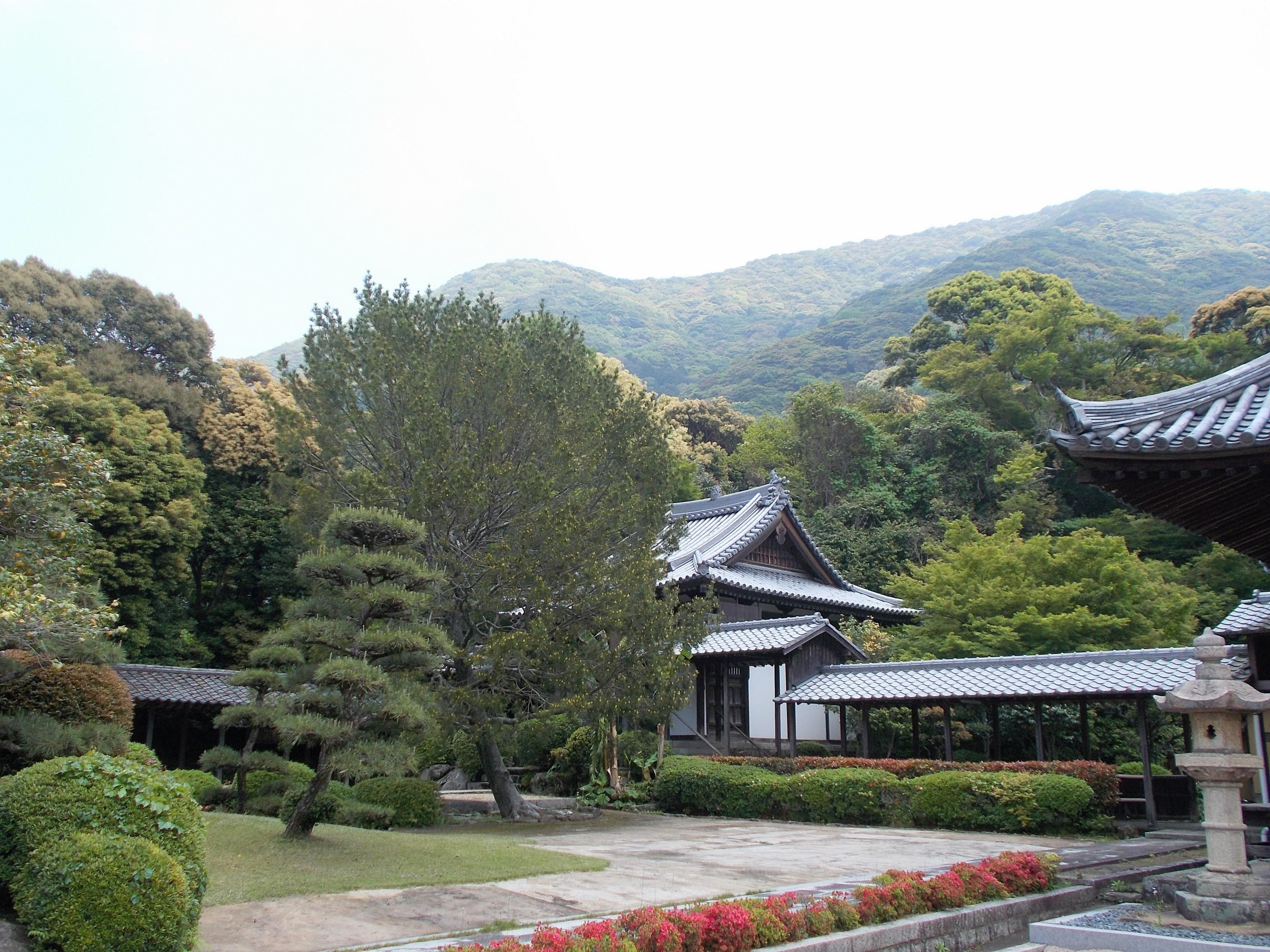
Kaisando
