= Egoku Domyo =

Priest in 17th century Japan

Egoku Dōmyō
- 慧極道明
- Title: Priest

Personal life
- Born: 1632 Japan
- Died: 1721 (aged 88–89)

Religious life
- Religion: Zen Buddhism
- School: Ōbaku

Egoku Dōmyō (慧極 道明, 1632–1721) was an Ōbaku priest, ordained at the age of nine into the Rinzai sect. In 1650, he met Tao-che—the Abbot of Sofuku-ji—in Nagasaki, Japan and subsequently joined his temple. Later he joined the assembly at Mampuku-ji in 1663, following the death of Tao-che. There he trained under his master's teacher Yin-Yuan and his disciple, Mu-an. He was ordained an Obaku monk in 1665 at the temple, receiving inka from Mu-an—Mu-an's second Dharma transmission. He founded and/or restored some twelve temples after receiving inka, and in 1687 served as Abbot at Zuisho-ji. He made forty-two Dharma heirs during his life.
