= Ingen =

Chinese poet and monk

Ingen Ryūki
- Yinyuan Longqi
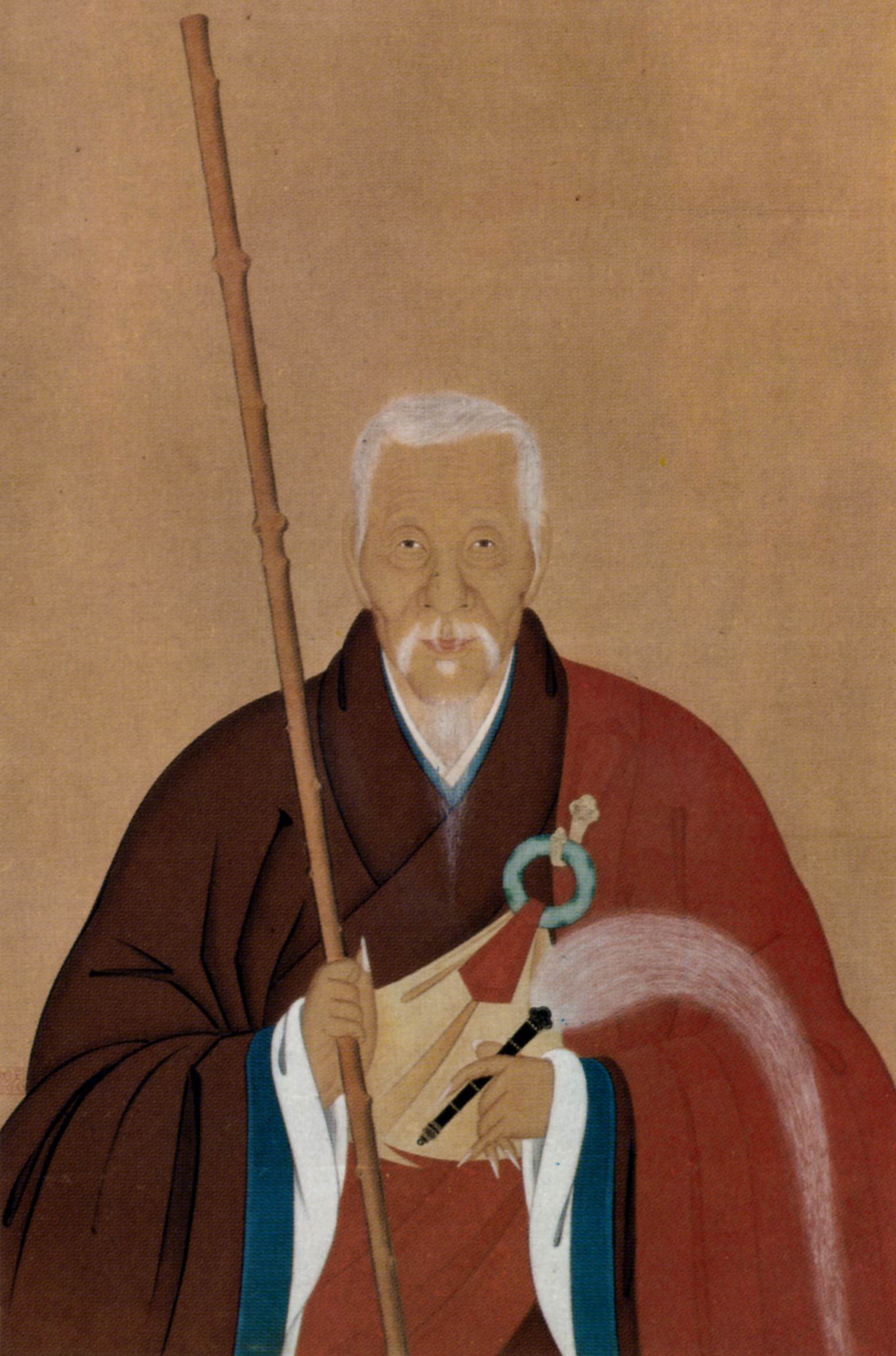
- Portrait of Ingen Ryūki from 1671

Personal life
- Born: Lin Zengbing; December 7, 1592 Fuqing, Fujian, Ming dynasty
- Died: May 19, 1673 (aged 80) Uji, Kyōto, Japan

Religious life
- Religion: Buddhism
- School: Chan
- Lineage: Linji school

Ingen Ryūki (traditional Chinese: 隱元隆琦; pinyin: Yǐnyuán Lóngqí; Japanese: 隠元隆琦, Japanese pronunciation: [iꜜŋ.ɡeɴ, -ŋeɴ]) (December 7, 1592 – May 19, 1673) was a Chinese poet, calligrapher, and monk of Linji Chan Buddhism from China. He is most known for founding the Ōbaku school of Zen in Japan.

Ingen is said to have introduced, from China into Japan, the common bean, which is named after him (Ingen mame (隠元豆; [iŋ.ɡeꜜm ma.me, iŋ.ŋeꜜm-], lit. 'Ingen bean'); Ingen itself is also short for Ingen mame). Robes worn by Ōbaku monks are called Ingengoromo (隠元衣; lit. 'Ingen robe').

== Biography ==
Ingen was born on December 7, 1592, in Fuqing, Fujian, during China's Ming dynasty. Ingen's father disappeared when he was five. At age 20, while searching for him, Ingen arrived at Mount Putuo off Zhejiang province, where he served tea to monks. At 28, after the death of his mother, he was ordained as a monk at his family temple - Wanfu Temple, Mount Huangbo, Fujian. Ingen's teachers there were Miyun Yuanwu and Feiyin Tongrong. In 1633 he received dharma transmission from the latter, and in 1637 served his first term as abbot. His second term as 33rd abbot of the temple began in 1646 and at this time he is credited with helping Mount Huangbo to develop into a thriving Buddhist centre.

In 1654, after repeated requests of Itsunen Shoyu, he went to Nagasaki, Japan with around 30 monks and artisans, including his disciple Mu'an. He founded the Ōbaku school of Zen. He established the Ōbaku head temple Manpuku-ji at Uji, Kyoto in 1661.

On May 21, 1673 (Enpō 1, 5th day of the 4th month), he died at Mampuku-ji.

== Calligraphy ==
Ingen was a skilled calligrapher, introducing the Ming style of calligraphy to Japan. Along with his disciples Mu'an and Sokuhi Nyoitsu, he was one of the Ōbaku no Sanpitsu ("Three Brushes of Ōbaku"). He is known to have carried paintings by Chen Xian with him to Japan.

== Selected work ==
Ingen's published writings encompass 35 works in 46 publications in 4 languages and 226 library holdings.

- 1979 — Complete Works of Ingen (新纂校訂隱元全集, Shinsan kōtei Ingen zenshū; OCLC 019817244)

== See also ==
- Egoku Dōmyō
