= Conrad Totman =

American historian

Conrad Davis Totman (born January 5, 1934) is an American environmental historian, Japanologist, and translator. Totman was a Professor Emeritus at Yale University.

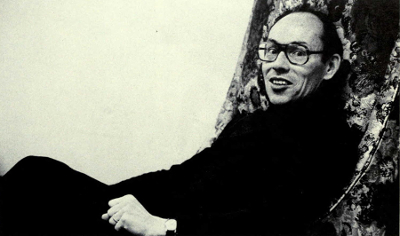
Conrad Totman at Northwestern University, 1975

== Early life ==
Totman was born in Conway, Massachusetts. He did his undergraduate studies at the University of Massachusetts Amherst and subsequently earned a Doctorate in East Asian history at Harvard University in 1964. He enlisted in the army in 1953. He served with the 8th Preventive Medicine Control Detachment in South Korea arriving 5 June 1954, just after the Korean War.

== Career ==
Totman taught Japanese history at the University of California at Santa Barbara, at Northwestern University, and Yale. He retired from Yale in 1997.

== Select works ==
Totman's published writings encompass 39 works in 145 publications in 4 languages and 7,885 library holdings.

- Politics in the Tokugawa Bakufu, 1600-1843, 1967
- The Collapse of the Tokugawa Bakufu, 1862-1868, 1980
- Japan Before Perry: A Short History, 1981
- Tokugawa Ieyasu: Shogun, 1983
- The Origins of Japan's Modern Forests: The Case of Akita, 1985
- The Green Archipelago: Forestry in Preindustrial Japan, 1989
- Tokugawa Japan: The Social and Economic Antecedents of Modern Japan, 1990
- Early Modern Japan, 1993
- The Lumber Industry in Early Modern Japan, 1995
- A History of Japan, 2000
- Pre-industrial Korea and Japan in Environmental Perspective, 2004
- Japan's Imperial Forest, Goryorin, 1889-1945: with a supporting study of the Kan/Min division of woodland in early Meiji Japan, 1871-76, 2007
- Japan: An Environmental History, 2014
