= Manpuku-ji =

Buddhist temple in Uji, Japan

- 萬福寺
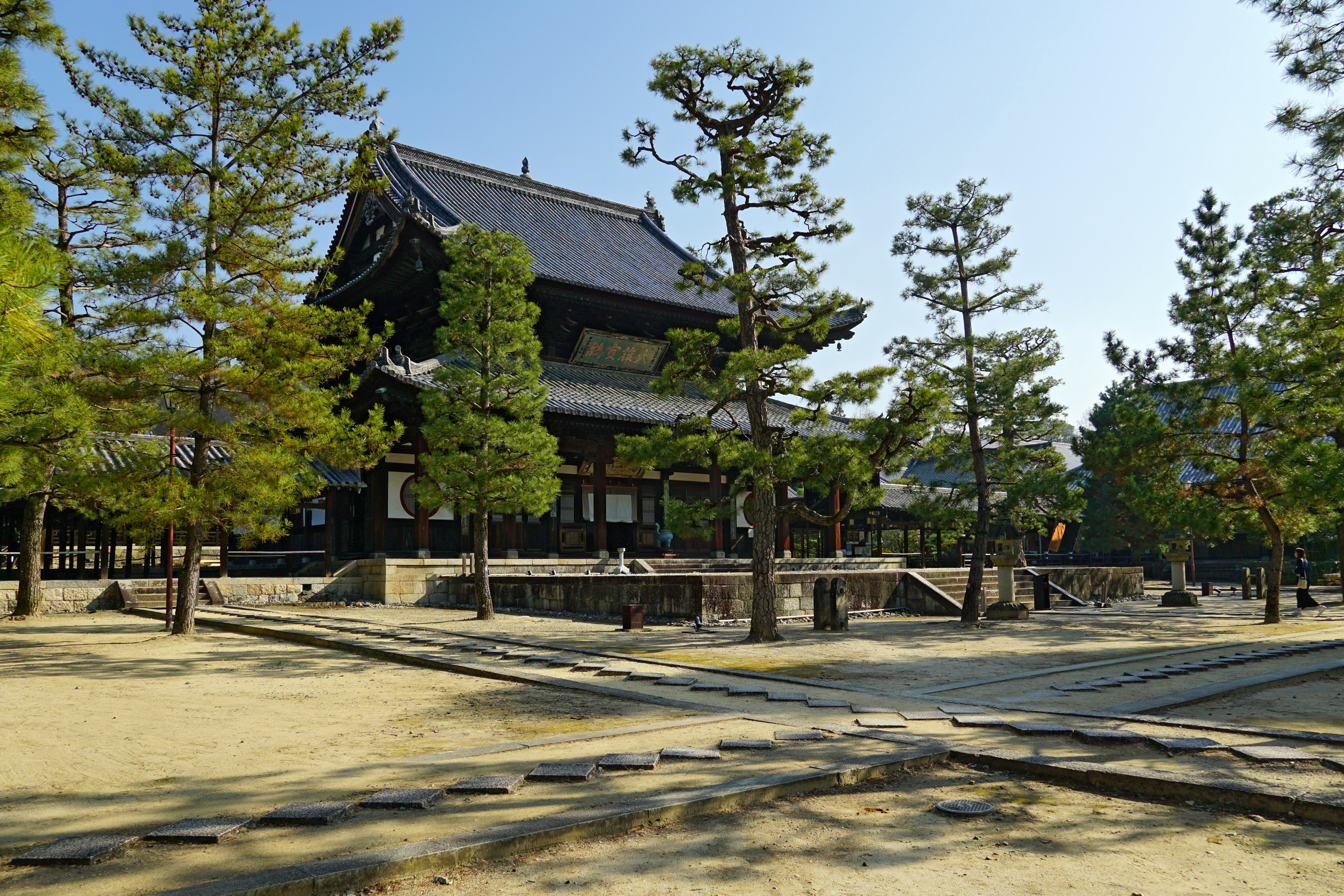
- Manpuku-ji's Daiyū Hōden, or Hall of the Great Hero

- Location within Kyoto Prefecture Location within Japan

Religion
- Affiliation: Zen Buddhism
- Sect: Ōbaku
- Deity: Shaka Nyorai
- Status: Head Temple

Location
- Location: Uji, Kyoto Prefecture
- Country: Japan
- Coordinates: 34°54′51.32″N 135°48′21.83″E

Architecture
- Founder: Ingen Ryūki; Mokuan Shōtō
- Completed: 1661

Website
- www.obakusan.or.jp

Manpuku-ji (Japanese: 萬福寺) is a Buddhist temple located in Uji, Kyoto Prefecture, approximately a 5-minute walk from JR Ōbaku Station・Keihan Ōbaku Station. It is the head temple of the Japanese Ōbaku Zen school, and named after Wanfu Temple in Fujian, China. The mountain is likewise named after Mount Huangbo, where the Chinese temple is situated.

== History ==
The temple was founded in 1661 by the Chinese monk Yinyuan Longqi (Ingen), officially opening in 1663.

In 1664, control of the temple passed to Mu'an, after which many Chinese monks followed as head priests. Only the fourteenth priest and his successors are Japanese.

On May 21, 1673 (Enpō 1, 5th day of the 4th month) Yinyuan (Ingen) died at the temple.

The art of Senchadō is closely tied to the temple due to its founder.

== Architecture ==
The temple structures were constructed in Ming China's architectural style.

The arrangement of buildings also follows Ming Dynasty architectural style, representing an image of a dragon.

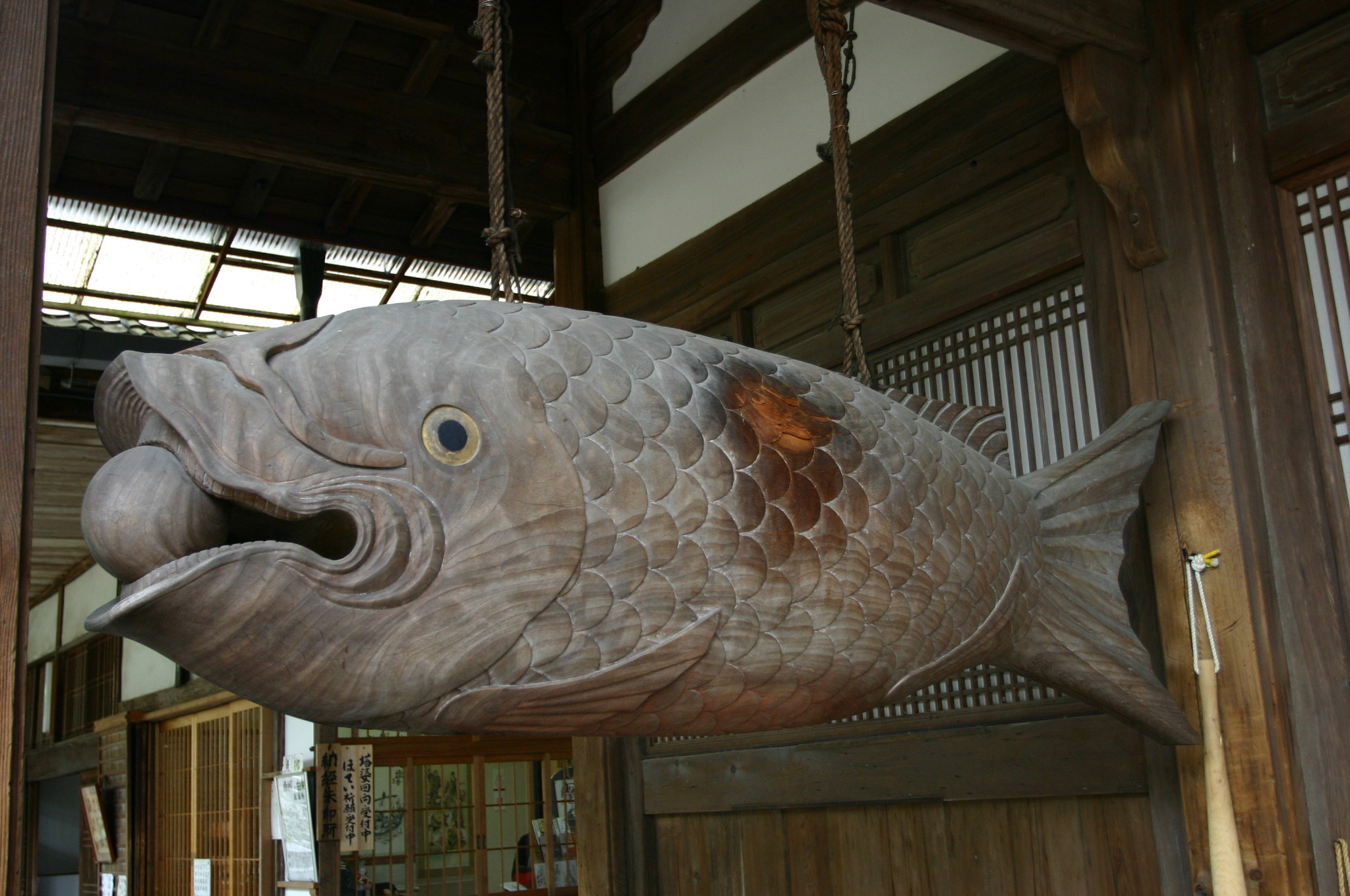
Gyoban (fish board)

The temple features an exemplary gyoban (fish board, used to toll the hours).

== Art ==
The temple's main statue is a seated Gautama Buddha. Sculptures by the Chinese sculptor known as Han Do-sei and latticed balustrades can also be seen.

Above the gate of the temple is a carving of the Chinese Characters "義一第", (read right-to-left, "The First Principle") carved from the writing of Imakita Kosen and said to have been the artist's eighty-fifth attempt before he finally wrote with a mind free from the distraction of a pupil's criticism.

The temple treasure house contains a complete collection of Buddhist scriptures commissioned by Tetsugen Doko and completed in 1678, comprising approximately 60,000 printing blocks which are still in use. The production of the printing blocks was funded by donations collected throughout the country for many years and through many troubles.

== Gallery ==
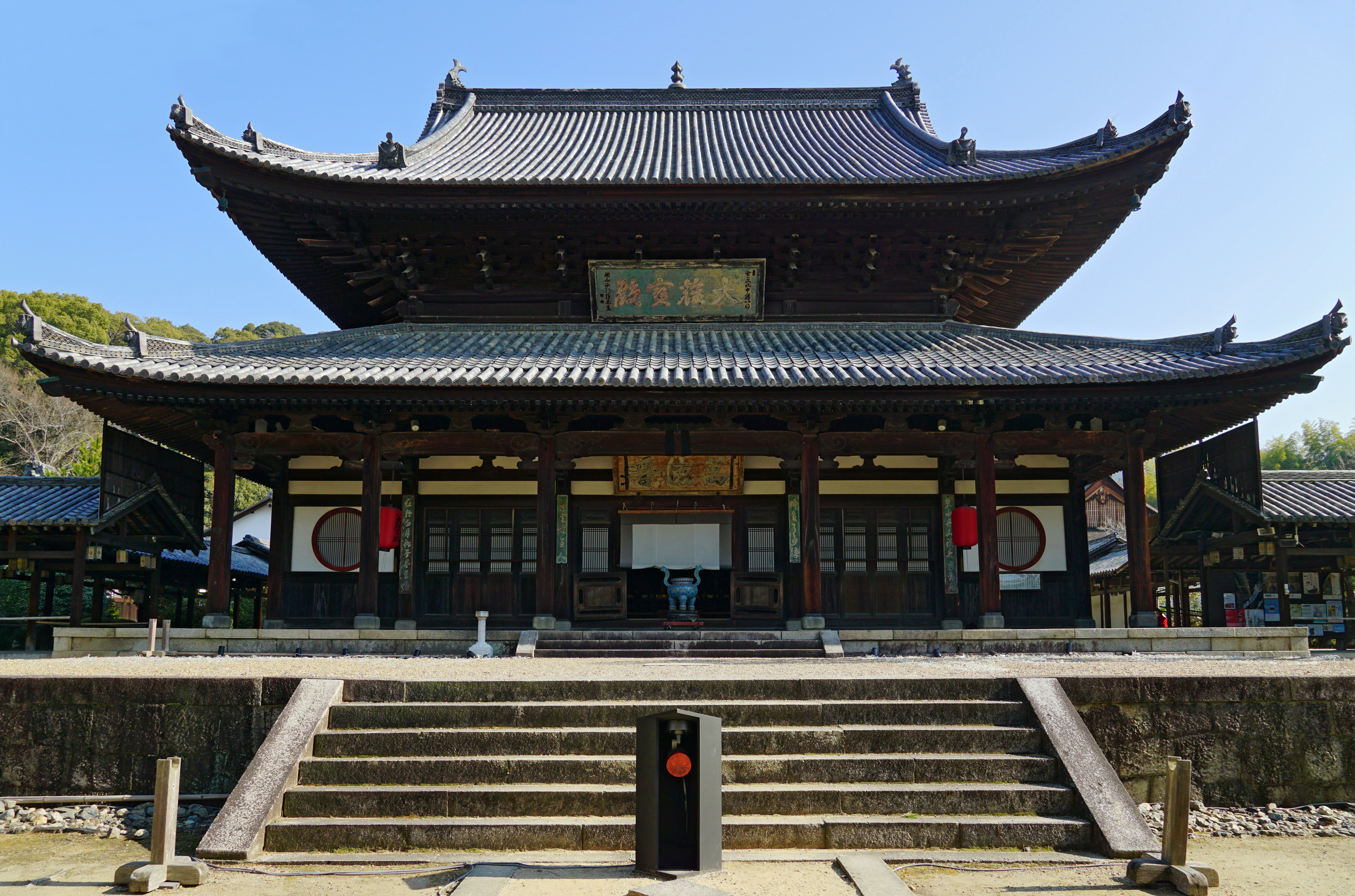
The Daiyū Hōden

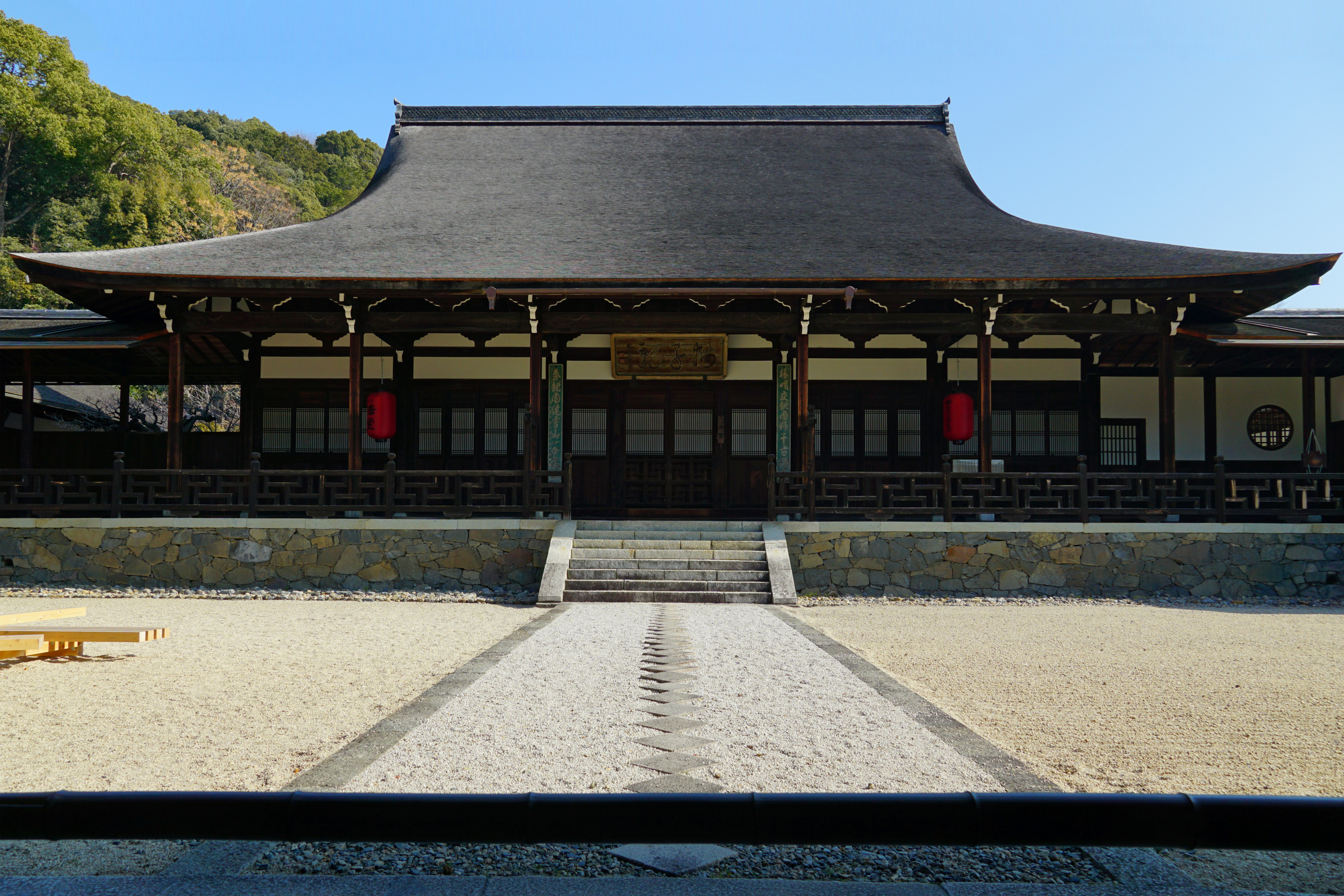
The Hattō

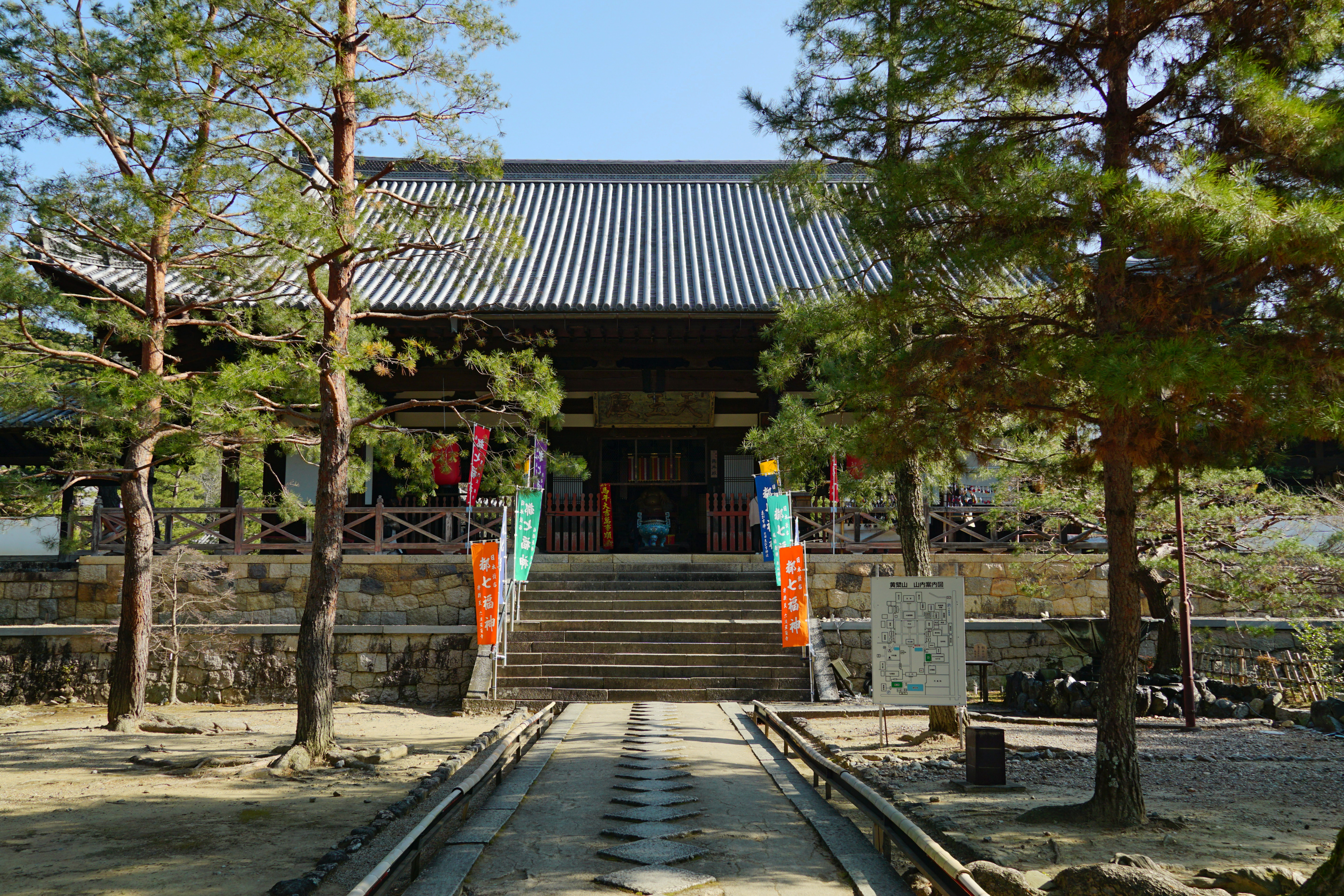
The Tennō-den

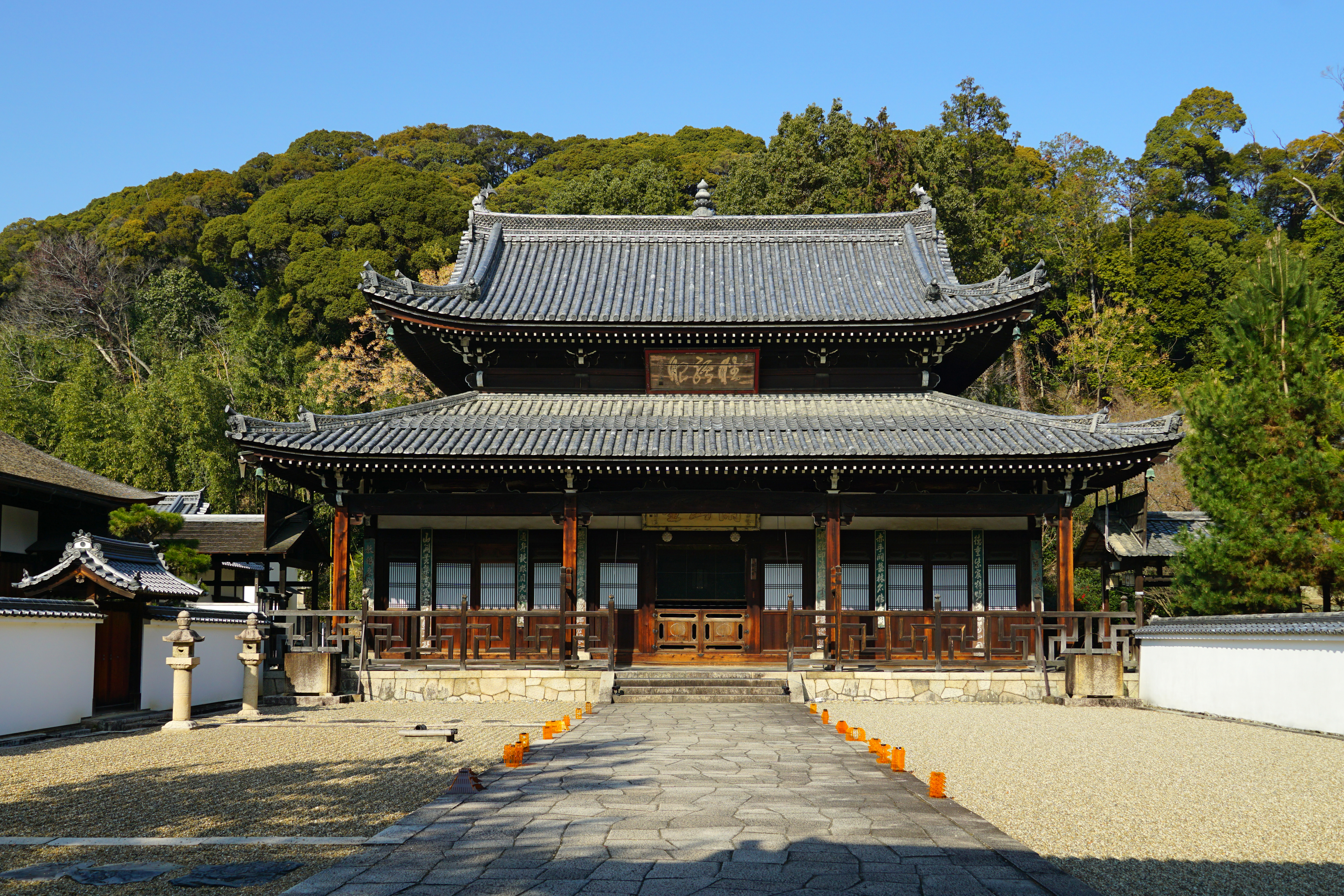
The Kaisando

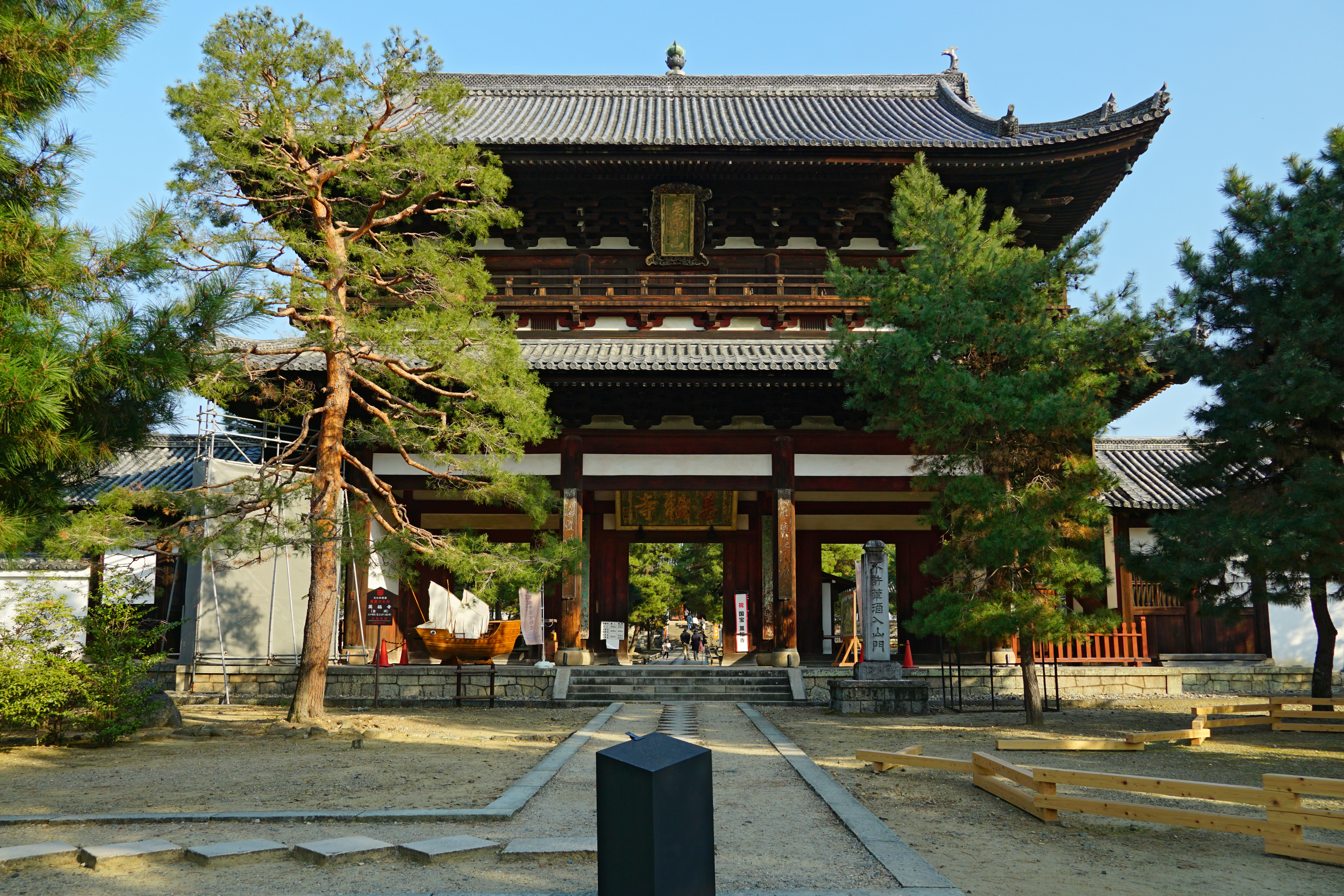
The Sanmon

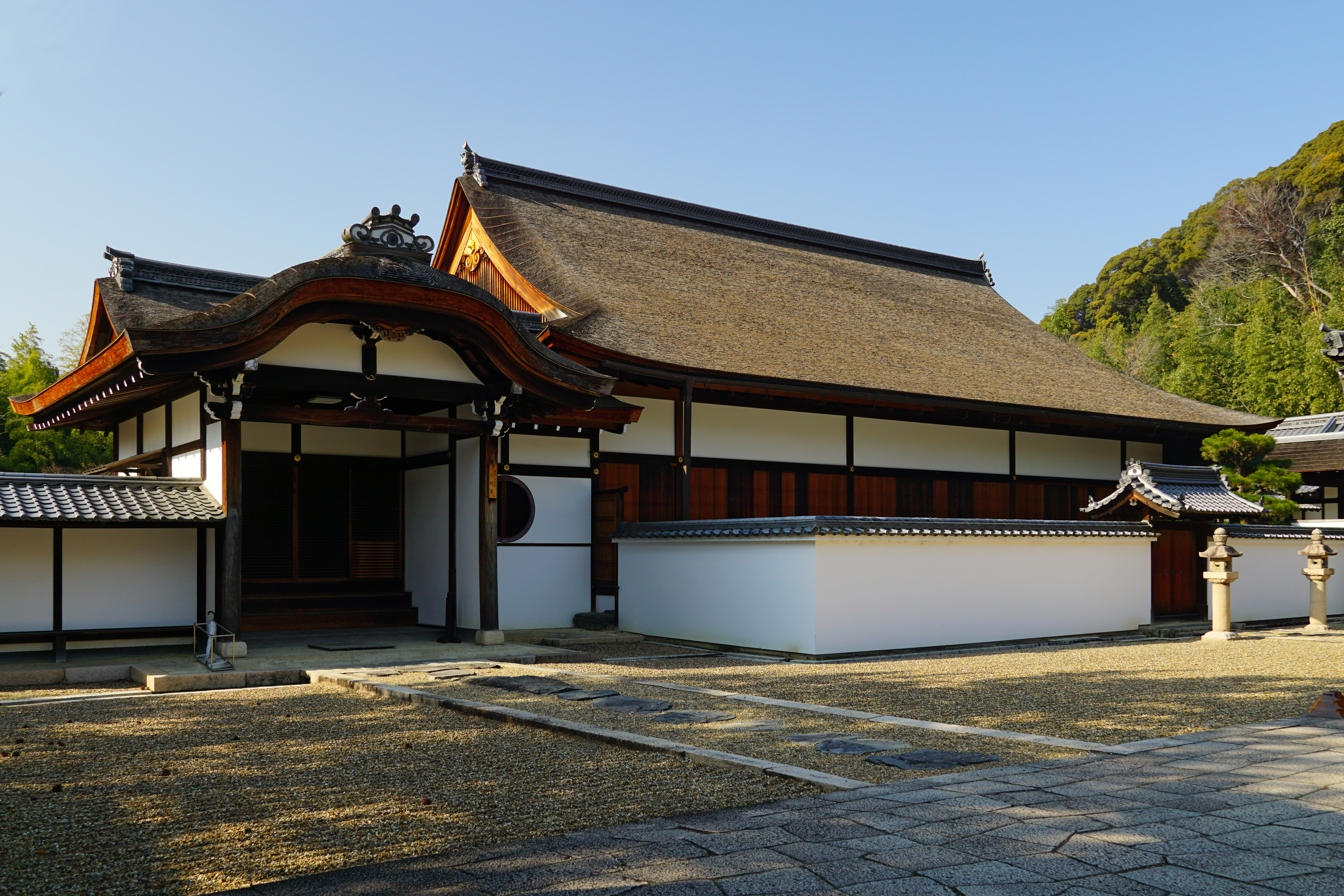
Kyakuden, Shoindo

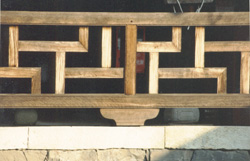
Balustrades, in manji-kuzushi (卍崩し; simplified swastika) style

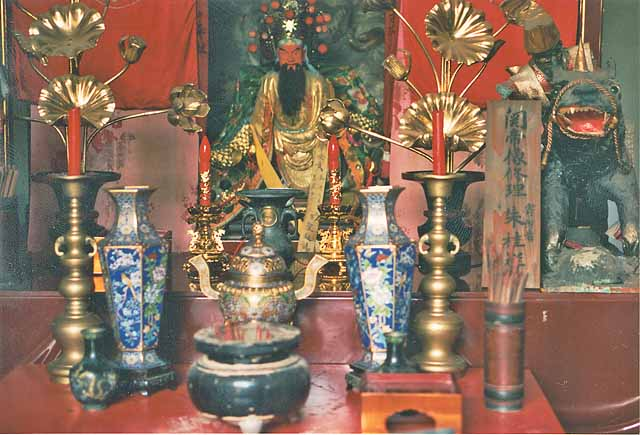
Altar to Kansei Teikun

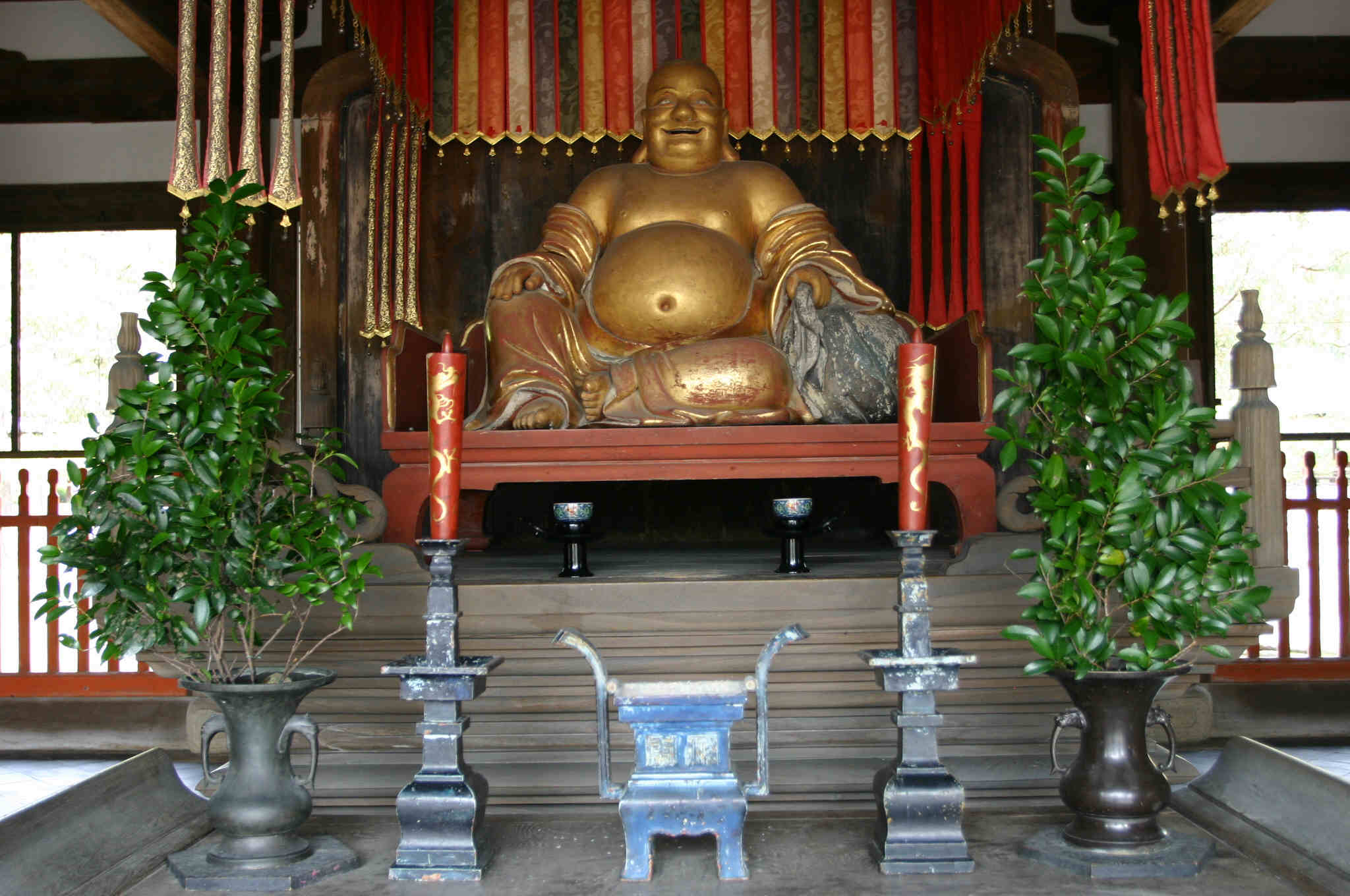
Statue of Hotei in the Tennō-den

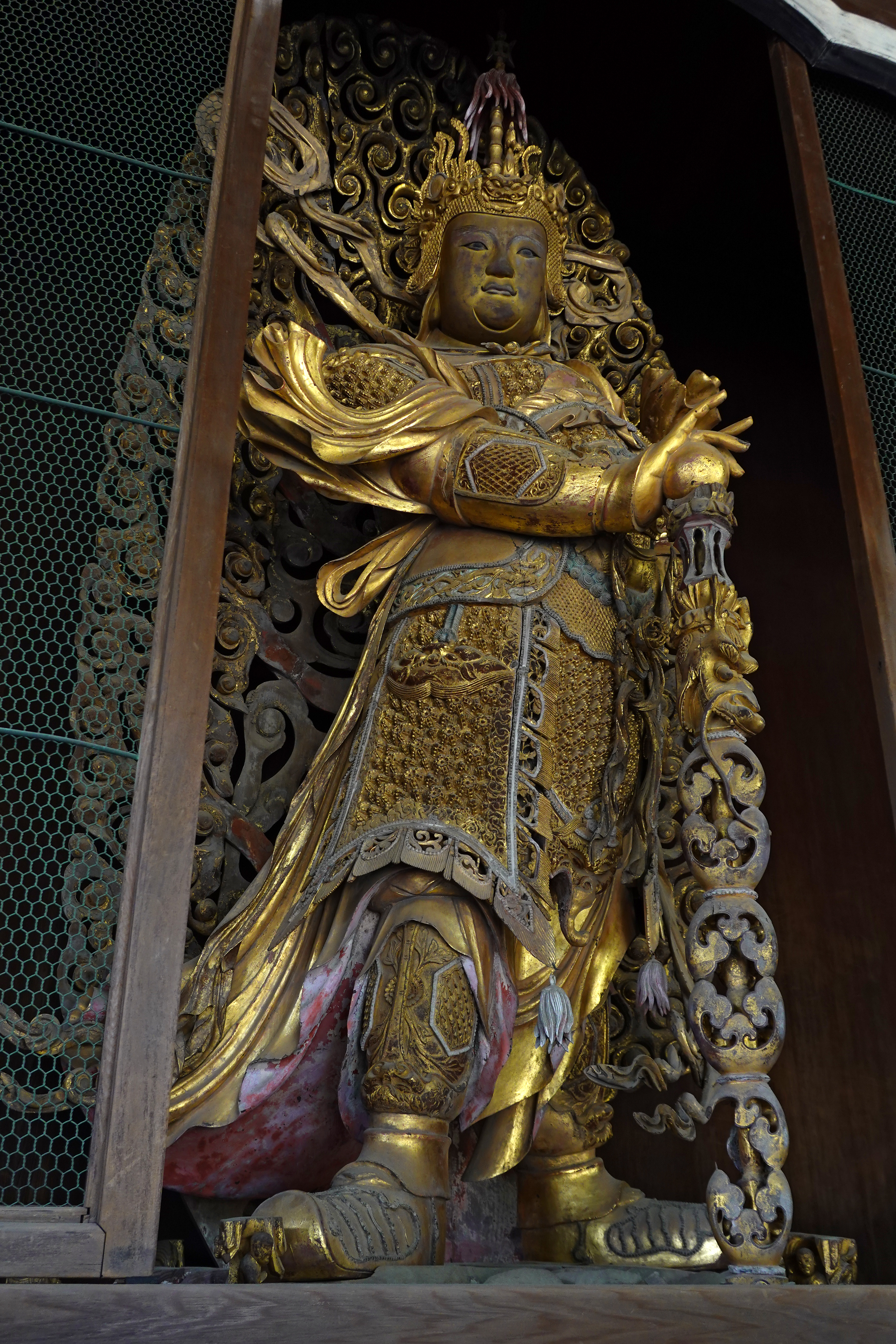
Statue of Idaten in the Tennō-den

== See also ==
- Japanese Buddhism
- Zen
- Egoku Dōmyō
