= Kōfuku-ji (Nagasaki) =

Buddhist temple in Nagasaki, Japan

Kōfuku-ji 興福寺
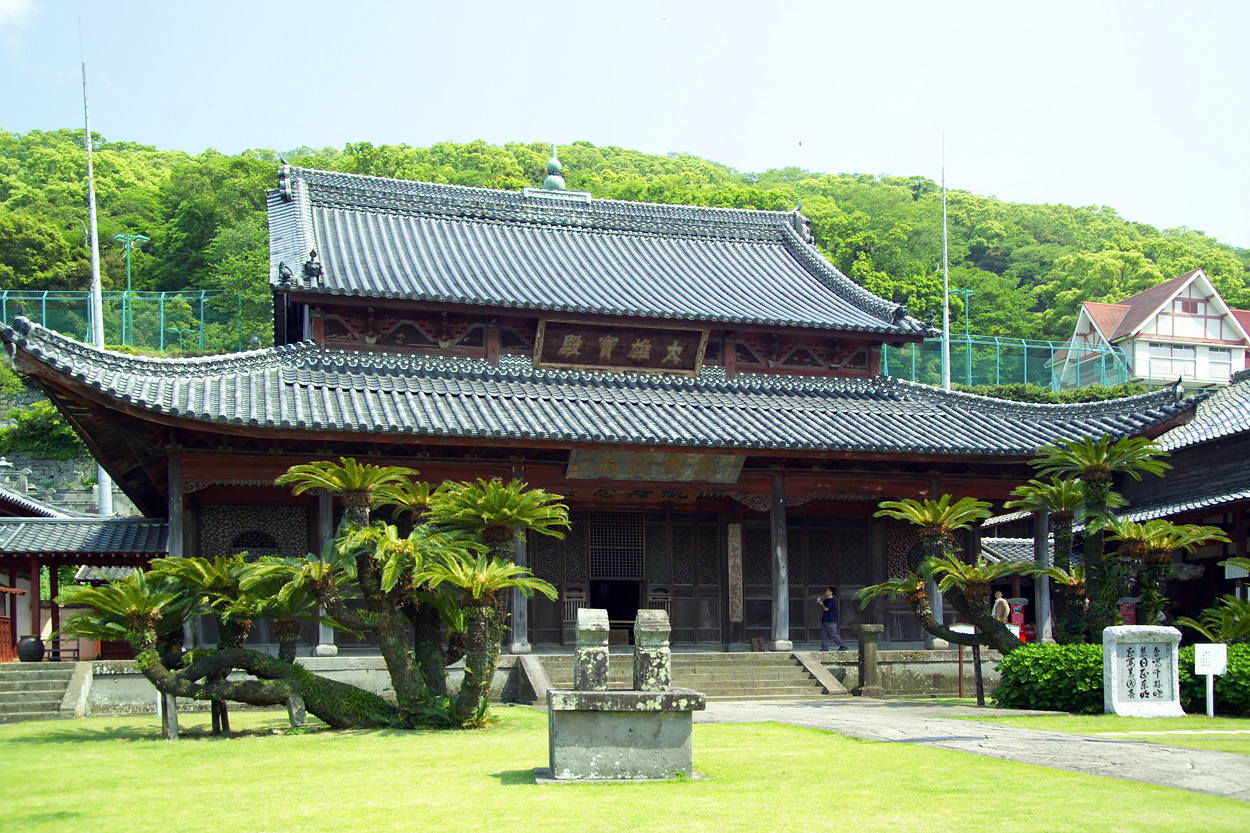
- Main Hall

Religion
- Affiliation: Ōbaku Zen
- Deity: Shaka Nyorai (Śākyamuni)

Location
- Location: 4-32 Teramachi, Nagasaki, Nagasaki Prefecture
- Country: Japan
- Interactive map of Kōfuku-ji 興福寺
- Coordinates: 32°44′52.3″N 129°53′2.0″E

Architecture
- Founder: Shin'en (Zhenyuan)
- Completed: 1624

Website
- http://kofukuji.com/

Kōfuku-ji or Tōmeizan Kōfuku-ji (Japanese: 東明山興福寺, Tōmeizan Kōfuku-ji) is a Buddhist temple of the Ōbaku school of Zen established in 1624 in Nagasaki, Japan. It is an important cultural asset designated by the government.

Its Mazu Hall (Masu-do) or Bodhisattva Hall (Bosa-do) is one of the few temples located in Japan of the Chinese sea goddess known as Mazu, the deified form of the medieval Fujianese shamaness Lin Moniang (Chinese: 林默孃).

== Gallery ==
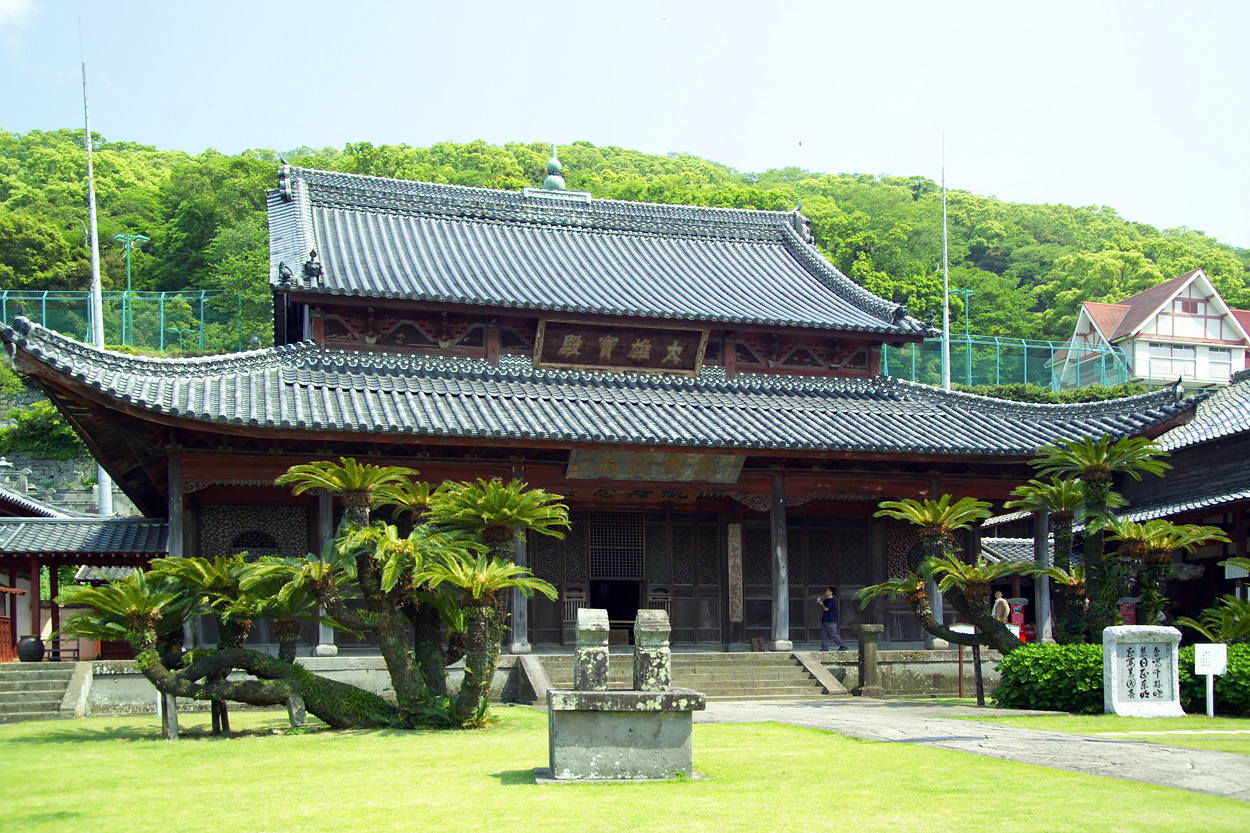
Main hall

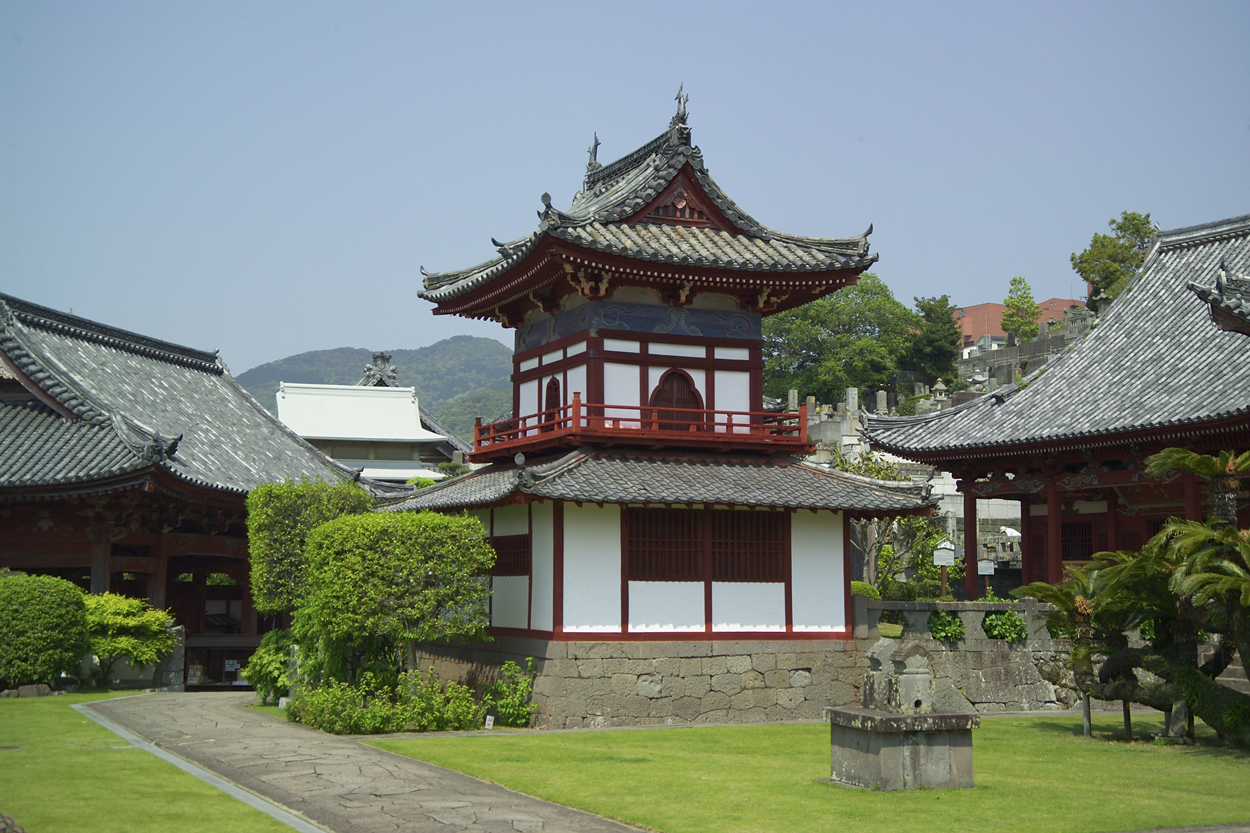
Bell and drum tower
