= Ōbaku =

School of Japanese Zen Buddhism

- 黄檗宗
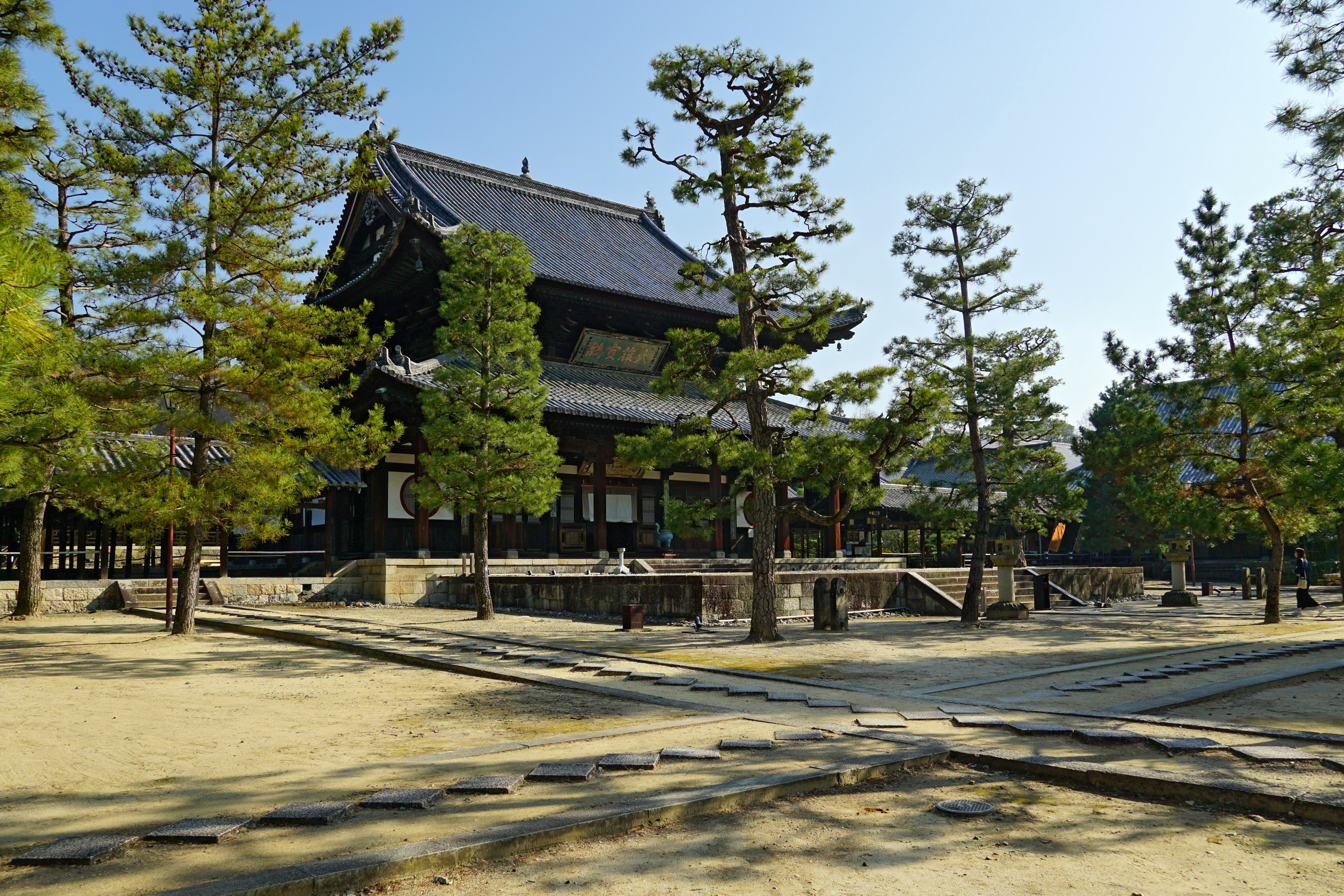
- Manpuku-ji in Uji, head temple of the Ōbaku sect.
- Classification: Buddhism
- Orientation: Zen
- Headquarters: Manpuku-ji
- Founder: Ingen Ryūki
- Origin: 1661; Japan
- Branched from: Linji school
- Places of worship: 420
- Official website: www.obakusan.or.jp

Ōbaku Zen or the Ōbaku school (Japanese: 黄檗宗, romanized: Ōbaku-shū) is one of three main schools of Japanese Zen Buddhism, in addition to the Sōtō and Rinzai schools. The school was founded in Japan by the Chinese monk Ingen Ryūki, who immigrated to Japan during the Manchu conquest of China in the 17th century.

It had a strong influence on Japanese Rinzai, which partly adopted Ōbaku practices, and partly renewed older practices in response to the Ōbaku school.

== History ==
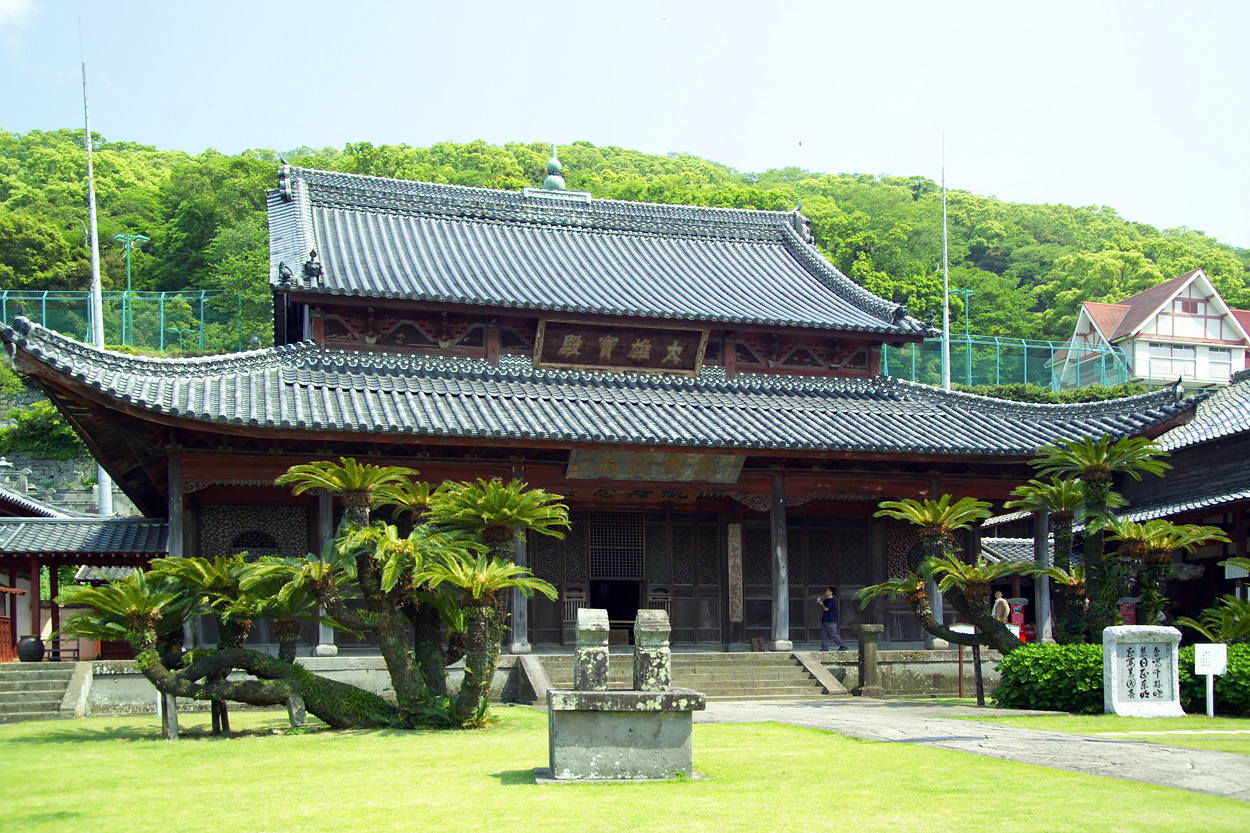
Daiyū Hōden (Mahavira Hall) at Kōfuku-ji in Nagasaki.

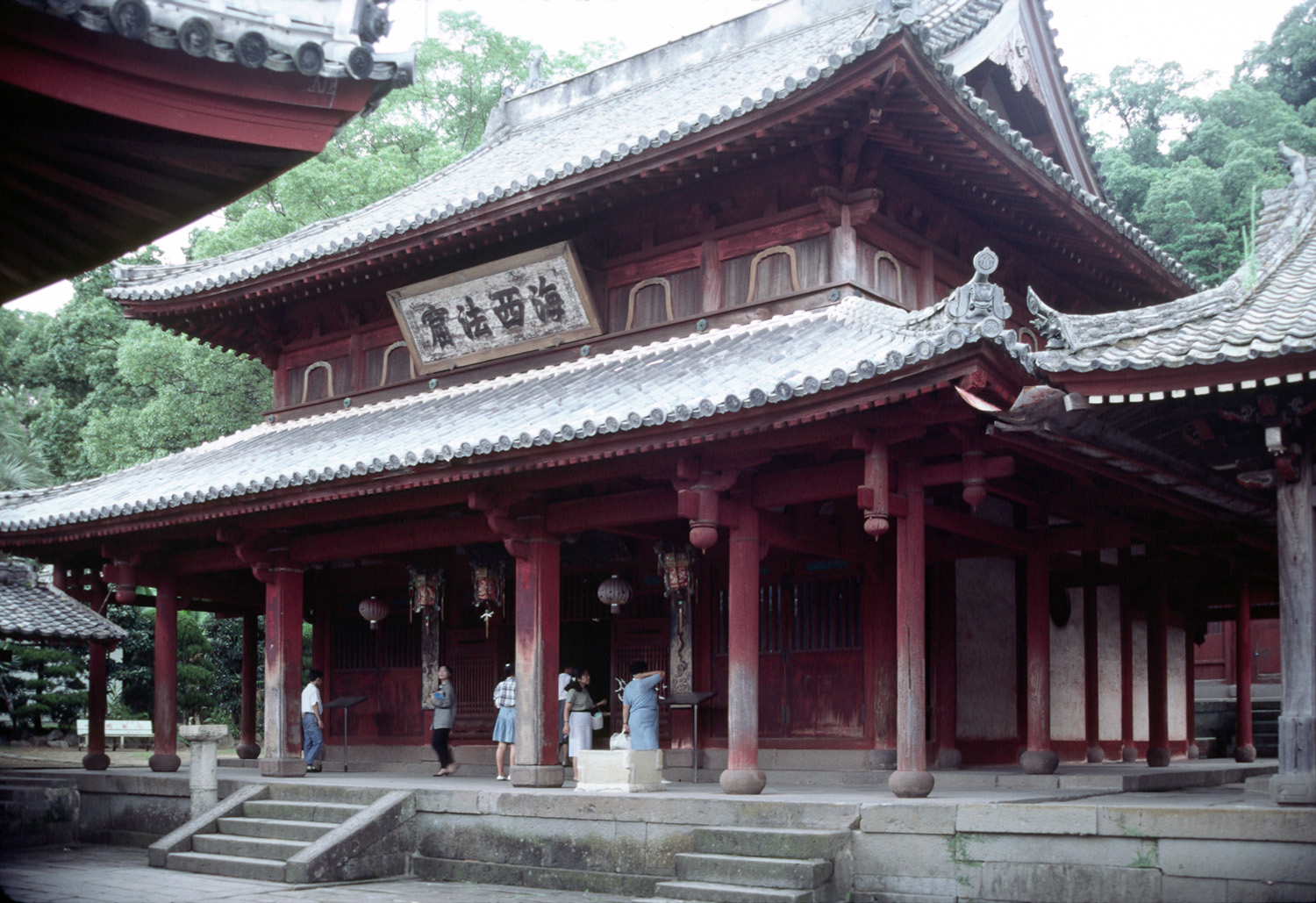
Meditation Hall at Sōfuku-ji in Nagasaki.

The development of the Ōbaku-shū in Japan began somewhere around 1620, a period when Chinese emigrants were coming to Nagasaki due to a decree by the shogunate allowing Chinese traders to conduct business there. The Chinese traders, in turn, began to request that monks from China come to Nagasaki "to serve the religious needs of their community and build monasteries in the late-Ming style with which they were familiar." The Chinese community was therefore thrilled when the founder of the Ōbaku, a master of the Linji school named Yinyuan Longqi (J. Ingen Ryūki), arrived from China in Nagasaki in 1654 with a small group of his Chinese students. Furthermore, Yinyuan himself was happy to get away from China, which was then amidst a terrible war. Yinyuan was there with the explicit purpose of helping three underdeveloped temples founded by Chinese emigrants grow in the city. These Nagasaki temples were known as the three "temples of good fortune," respectively Kōfuku-ji, Fukusai-ji and Sōfuku-ji. In time many Japanese heard of his teachings and traveled to Nagasaki to see him, while some came to join his community and become students. Having planned to stay in Japan for a short period of time, Yinyuan was persuaded by a group of his Japanese students to remain in Japan; this group secured him governmental permission to relocate to Kyoto, where his student Ryūkai Shōsen wished he would then become abbot of the Rinzai temple Myoshin-ji. Authorities within the Rinzai organization were not keen on this idea, due primarily to a disagreement within the congregation as to whether or not Yinyuan presented a take on Zen that was too distinctly Chinese for Japanese tastes. As a consequence, Yinyuan began construction of the modern day head temple of the Ōbaku known as Ōbaku-san Manpuku-ji in 1661 in Uji of Kyoto Prefecture (Ōbaku-san being the mountain name). This marks the emergence of the Ōbaku school/sect of Zen Buddhism in Japan.

Construction was completed in 1669, the architecture done in the Chinese Ming dynasty style. By authorization of the local bakufu leaders (i.e. Tokugawa Tsunayoshi), the Ōbaku-shu emerged to help revitalize Rinzai practice in Japan. The practice at Manpuku-ji was different from that in other Rinzai temples and monasteries of Japan during this period, being much more Chinese in its approach. Yinyuan brought with him aspects of esoteric Buddhism and Pure Land Buddhism. As Heinrich Dumoulin puts it, "For Zen practice in general, seated meditation and the practice of kōan are central, while cultic ceremony is of secondary importance. Insofar as the Ōbaku belonged to the Rinzai tradition, zazen and kōan practice were made part of daily life, but ritual was also accorded a place of considerable importance." Furthermore, Ōbaku monasteries and temples came to be governed by a doctrine known as Ōbaku shingi, which both imported Chinese practices such as the recitation (dharani) of nembutsu and "sought to preserve the Chinese character of the group." The Ōbaku also chanted sutras derived from the Pure Land Buddhist sect set to Chinese music.

After Yinyuan's retirement in 1664 and death in 1673, other monks who had come to Japan around the same time as he helped to carry on the tradition of practice at Manpuku-ji. The foremost of his disciples was Mokuan Shōtō, who became 2nd abbot of Manpuku-ji in 1664. During its formative years, Manpuku-ji was very popular in Japan with many adherents coming to the temple for instruction. According to the book Latter Days of the Law, "For the next century, Manpuku-ji was headed by Chinese immigrant monks, and they sent their Japanese followers to found other temples. Ōbaku Zen quickly spread through the country." At least one abbot of Manpuku-ji during this period of early Ōbaku history proved to be controversial. His name was Tu-chan Hsing-jung (Dokutan Shōtei), and he served as 4th abbot of Manpuku-ji. Critics charge that he took his emphasis on nembutsu recitation at Manpuku-ji too far, and he is today derisively nicknamed "Nembutsu Dokutan".

Perhaps the most important Ōbaku practitioner besides Yinyuan Longqi was Tetsugen Dōkō, a Japanese man who lived from 1630 to 1682. Tetsugen is remembered for having transcribed the entire Ming period Chinese Tripitaka to woodblocks—known as the Tetsugen-ban or Ōbaku-ban (ban meaning edition). Raised as part of the Jōdo Shinshū of Japan, Tetsugen first met Yinyuan in 1655 at Kōfuku-ji in Nagasaki and eventually came to join the Ōbaku. The first Japanese abbot of Manpuku-ji assumed leadership of the Ōbaku in 1740, a man by the name of Ryūtō Gentō. From 1786 on through to the modern-day, the Ōbaku has been run and controlled by exclusively Japanese leadership.

Today Manpuku-ji serves as the Ōbaku's head temple, with 420 subtemples spread throughout Japan as of 2006.

== Characteristics and influence ==
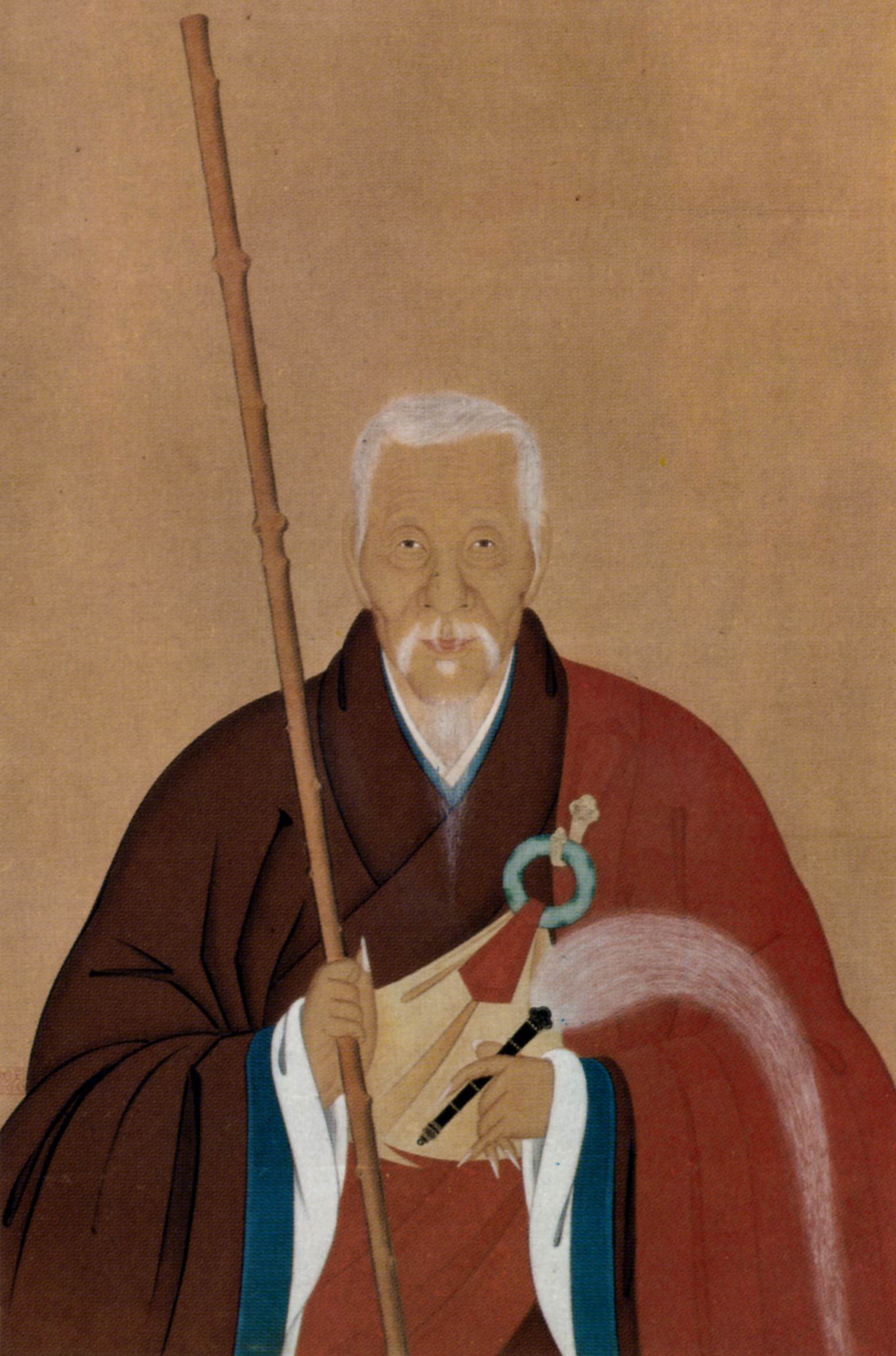
Portrait of Chinese monk Yinyuan (Ingen), who founded the Ōbaku school

=== Monastic practice ===
Monastic practices of the Ōbaku-shū were once largely informed by the Ōbaku shingi (or, Ōbaku codes), composed in 1672 with ten sections outlining the practice regimen at Manpuku-ji. Steven Heine writes that, "The text reflected a few evolutionary changes that had taken place in Chinese monasteries since the Yuan, but it was squarely in the tradition of classical rules of purity such as the Chanyuan qingui and Chixiu baizhang qingqui." The Rinzai branch Myōshin-ji authored their own set of monastic regulations (penned by Mujaku Dōchū) in response to this later in 1685. To be sure, Myoshinji was worried about losing students to the Ōbaku, who were growing in popularity. The Ōbaku's "emphasis on the precepts and the strict observance of monastic regulations embodied in Ōbaku shingi seem to have stimulated and encouraged certain Japanese masters of similar bent. In the Sōtō school, for example, the Chinese teachers influenced the monastic codes of reformers like Gesshū Sōko and Manzan Dōhaku who had studied under Ōbaku masters."

Historically, the Ōbaku-shū has sometimes been referred to as "Nembutsu Zen"—a derogatory characterization intended to describe their use of "Zen and Pure Land practices." The Ōbaku-shū emphasized the taking of various precepts and also observed the Vinaya of the Dharmaguptaka tradition as well as sutra translation. But perhaps most obvious to the Japanese was their use of nembutsu and also their use of the "nembutsu kōan" which entailed the practice of reciting the name of Amitabha while holding in one's mind the kōan, "Who is reciting?" While foreign to the Japanese (despite this "dual practice" being introduced in Japan as early as the late 13th century), this was very common in Ming period Chan Buddhism, where there was no sectarian divide between Pure Land Buddhists and Chan practitioners.

=== Convergence with Rinzai-Zen ===
Heine and Wright note that:

... regardless of its inclusion of Pure Land elements, the fact remained that the Ōbaku school, with its group practice of zazen on the platforms in a meditation hall and its emphasis on keeping the precepts, represented a type of communal monastic discipline far more rigorous than anything that existed at the time in Japanese Buddhism.

As a result of their approach, which caused a stir in Japan, many Rinzai and Sōtō masters undertook reforming and revitalizing their own monastic institutions, such as Rinzai master Ungo Kiyō who even began implementing the use of nembutsu into his training regimen at Zuigan-ji. T. Griffith Foulk writes:

The followers of Hakuin Ekaku (1687—1769) tried to purge the elements of Ōbaku Zen they found objectionable. They suppressed the Pure Land practice of reciting Amida Buddha's name, deemphasized the Vinaya, and replaced sutra study with a more narrow focus on traditional koan collections.

Rooted in the lineage (school) of Linji, and therefore sharing a familial relationship with the Rinzai-shū of Japan, the Ōbaku's approach to practice is today tinged with a hint of Chinese influence. Helen J. Baroni writes that today, "With a few notable exceptions, such as the style of sutra chanting (which continues to be done in an approximation of Fujian dialect), Ōbaku temples and monasteries appear very like their Rinzai neighbors." Statistically the smallest school/sect of Zen in modern-day Japan, the Ōbaku is also like the Rinzai-shū in that it is known to be more conservative and intellectually inclined than the Sōtō-shū.

Ōbaku abbots are now all from the Ōtōkan lineage, the same as Rinzai, and thus practices are largely similar, though this was not the case originally. Specifically, starting under the leadership of chief abbot Ryochu Nyoryu 良忠如隆 (1793–1868), Zen practice largely became the same as Rinzai practice, but monastic and cultural differences remain. Additionally, Buddhist sutras in the Ōbaku-shū continue today to be chanted in Tō-on.

=== Culture ===
In addition to their contribution to Zen in Japan, the Ōbaku also "disseminated many aspects of Ming-period culture" in the country. Many of the monks who came from China were accomplished calligraphers, and Obaku's founder Yinyuan Longqi and two other Ōbaku masters, Mokuan Shōtō and Sokuhi Nyoitsu, became known as the Ōbaku no Sanpitsu (or, the "Three Brushes of Ōbaku"). Author Steven Heine writes, "Areas where the influence of—or the reaction to—Ōbaku left an imprint on Japanese Buddhism is manifold, and its impact even reached the fields of Japanese cultural techniques, such as printing and painting. Chinese medicine and architecture were also introduced, as was the practice of "spirit writing", the latter practiced by Ōbaku monks who were said to communicate with Chen Tuan.

The Ōbaku school is also well known for its style of vegetarian cooking known as fucha ryōri (普茶料理), its version of Buddhist cuisine (in Japan known as shōjin ryōri (精進料理; devotion cuisine)). This is similar to usual shōjin ryōri, but with more Chinese influence. It was introduced by Yinyuan and his group, and served at the main temple of Manpuku-ji, along with various subtemples such as Kanga-an.

The Ōbaku school also introduced Ming dynasty tea culture to Japan, including the steeping of loose-leaf teas (sencha) rather than the powdered matcha used in chanoyu. Ōbaku monks and intellectuals such as Baisao opposed the rigid, elaborate formalism of chanoyu and promoted a carefree, informal approach inspired by ancient Chinese sages. This would later produce a new type of tea ceremony called senchado, and sencha would eventually become the most popular form of tea consumed in Japan.

== Notable temples ==
=== Head temple ===
- Manpuku-ji – Construction began in 1661 and concluded in 1669. Located in Kyoto, Manpuku-ji serves as the head temple of the Ōbaku school. It provides a "rare example" of a temple built in a purely Chinese Ming period architectural style in Japan.

=== Subtemples ===
- Fukusai-ji – Founded in 1628 in Nagasaki and later destroyed in 1945, Fukusai-ji has since been reconstructed in the shape of a turtle with an 18-metre high aluminum alloy statue of Kannon, the Bodhisattva of compassion. The interior is famous for the 25-metre Foucault Pendulum which swings over the remains of 16,500 Japanese killed during World War II.
- Fukugon-ji (Yanagawa)
- Fukuju-ji (Kitakyushu)
- Kōfuku-ji (Nagasaki)
- Ryūshin-ji
- Shōhō-ji (Gifu)
- Sōfuku-ji (Nagasaki)
- Toko-ji
- Zuishō-ji

== See also ==
- Buddhism in Japan
- Mount Huangbo
- Religion in Japan
- Rinzai
- Sōtō

== Sources ==
- Allen, Percy Stafford; John de Monins Johnson (1908). Transactions of the Third International Congress for the History of Religions. Clarendon Press. OCLC 1090222.
- Baroni, Helen Josephine (2000). Obaku Zen: The Emergence of the Third Sect of Zen in Tokugawa, Japan. University of Hawaii Press. ISBN 0-8248-2243-9.
- Baskind, James (2008), "The Nianfo in Obaku Zen: A Look at the Teachings of the Three Founding Masters" (PDF), Japanese Religions 33 (1-2), 19-34, archived from the original on March 22, 2014
- Baroni, Helen Josephine (2006). Iron Eyes: The Life and Teachings of the Ōbaku Zen master Tetsugen Dōko. State University of New York Press. ISBN 0-7914-6891-7.
- Coldicott, Nicholas (Jan 30, 2009). "An intoxicating temple in Kyoto". The Japan Times.
- Dodd, Jan; Richmond, Simon (2001). The Rough Guide to Japan. Rough Guides. ISBN 1-85828-699-9.
- Dougill, John (2006). Kyoto: A Cultural History. Oxford University Press. ISBN 0-19-530138-2.
- Dumoulin, Heinrich (1990). Zen Buddhism: A History. Collier Macmillan. ISBN 0-02-908240-4.
- Fischer, Felice; Kyoko Kinoshita; Taiga Ike; Gyokuran (2007). Ike Taiga and Tokuyama Gyokuran: Japanese Masters of the Brush. Yale University Press. ISBN 978-0-300-12218-3.
- Griffith Foulk, T. (1988), "The Zen Institution in Modern Japan", in Kraft, Kenneth (ed.), Grove Press
- Haskel, Peter (2001). Letting Go: The Story of Zen Master Tōsui. University of Hawaii Press. ISBN 0-8248-2440-7.
- Heine, Steven; Dale S. Wright (2000). The Koan: Texts and Contexts in Zen Buddhism. Oxford University Press. ISBN 0-19-511748-4.
- Heine, Steven; Wright, Dale S. (2005). Zen Classics: Formative Texts in the History of Zen Buddhism. Oxford University Press. ISBN 0-19-517525-5. OCLC 191827544.
- Kraft, Kenneth (1988). Zen: Tradition and Transition. Grove Press. ISBN 0-8021-3162-X.
- Lloyd, Arthur (2007). The Creed of Half Japan: Historical Sketches of Japanese Buddhism. Gardeners Books. ISBN 978-0-548-00645-0.
- Rowthorn, Chris (2005). Lonely Planet Kyoto: City Guide. Lonely Planet. ISBN 1-74104-085-X.
- Smith-Weidner, Marsha; Patricia Ann Berger (1994). Latter Days of the Law: Images of Chinese Buddhism, 850-1850. University of Hawaii Press. ISBN 0-8248-1662-5.
- Totman, Conrad (1993). Early Modern Japan. University of California Press. ISBN 0-520-20356-9.
