= Mu'an =

Mu'an (Chinese: 木庵性瑫; pinyin: Mù'ān Xìngtāo; Japanese Mokuan Shōtō) (1611–1684) was a Chinese Chan monk who followed his master Ingen to Japan in 1654. Mokuan was from Chuanchow in what was then Fukien Province. He and Sokuhi Nyoitsu were the two disciples most involved in spreading Ingen's teachings.

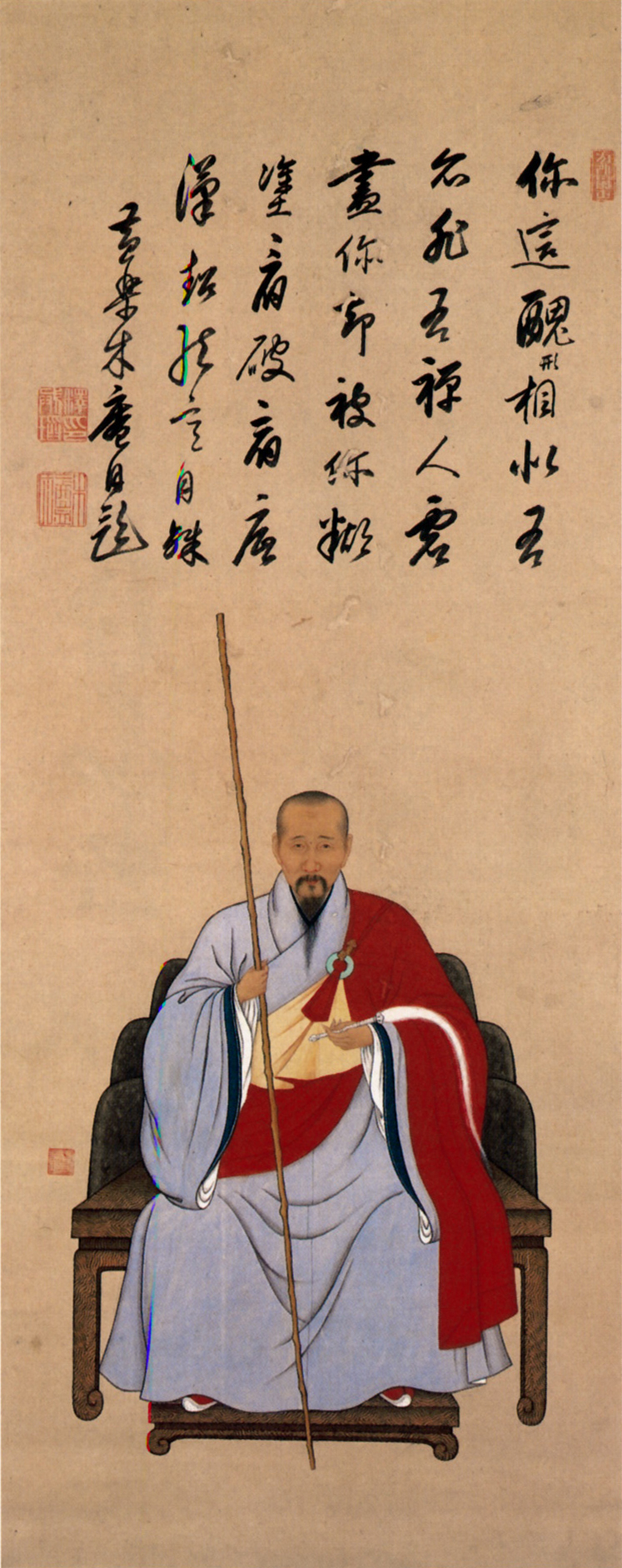
Portrait of Muyan.

== History ==
Together they founded the Ōbaku Zen school and Mampuku-ji, the school's head temple at Uji in 1661. In 1664, Muyan succeeded his master as chief of the temple and in 1671 established another temple called Zuishō-ji at Shirokane, Edo. He is honored as one of the Ōbaku no Sanpitsu.

His work is kept in a variety of museums, including the Smart Museum of Art, University of Michigan Museum of Art, the Indianapolis Museum of Art, the Museum of Fine Arts, Boston, and the British Museum.

== See also ==
- Egoku Dōmyō
- Japanese Buddhism
- Obaku no Sanpitsu
