= Mount Huangbo =

Mountain in Fujian, China

Coordinates: 25.624657°N 119.205608°E

Mount Huangbo (Chinese: 黄檗山; pinyin: Huángbò Shān) is a mountain in Fuqing county of Fujian Province, in the East China region of the People's Republic of China. This mountain is written as 黄山 too.

The mountain has many Buddhist temples, including Wanfu Temple (home of Yinyuan Longqi, founder of the Japanese Ōbaku Zen sect).

== See also ==
- Mountains of China
