= List of Cultural Properties of Uji =

This list is of the Cultural Properties of Japan located within the city of Uji in Kyōto Prefecture.

== Statistics ==
As of 20 April 2012, 145 Properties have been designated (including nine *National Treasures) and a further 4 Properties registered. Since a single designation or registration may include more than one item, the total number of assets protected and promoted in accordance with the Law for the Protection of Cultural Properties (1950) exceeds the sum of designations and registrations.

Cultural Properties of Japan		National	Prefectural	Municipal	Total
Designated Cultural Properties
Tangible	Structures	(*3) 13	12	5	30
Tangible	Paintings	(*1) 5		3	8
Tangible	Sculptures	(*3) 22	3	35	60
Tangible	Applied Crafts	(*2) 4	1	2	7
Tangible	Calligraphic works Classical books	3		6	9
Tangible	Ancient documents		6		6
Tangible	Archeological artefacts		3	4	7
Tangible	Historic materials	1		2	3
Intangible		1		1	2
Folk	Tangible				
Folk	Intangible		1		1
Monuments	Historic Sites	3	1	1	5
Monuments	Places of Scenic Beauty	(1)	2		2 (1)
Monuments	Natural Monuments			1	1
Cultural Landscapes		1			1
Preservation Districts			2		2
Conservation Techniques		1			1
Total		54	31	60	145
Registered Cultural Properties
Tangible	Structures		4		4
Tangible	Works of Art or Craft				
Folk Tangible					
Monuments	Historic Sites				
Monuments	Places of Scenic Beauty				
Monuments	Natural Monuments				
Total			4		4

† National Treasures (denoted with an asterisk, smaller text, and brackets) are included within the count of Important Cultural Properties; Monuments designated in more than one class (denoted with brackets) are counted once.

== Designated Cultural Properties ==
Property	Owner	Date	No. of Assets	Comments	Image	Coordinates	Type	Level	Ref.
*Byōdō-in Phoenix Hall 平等院鳳凰堂; Byōdōin Hōōdō	Byōdō-in	Heian period (1053)	4	Byōdō-in is inscribed on the UNESCO World Heritage List as one of the Historic Monuments of Ancient Kyoto (Kyoto, Uji and Otsu Cities)		34°53′21″N 135°48′28″E	Structures	National (NT)	
Byōdō-in Kannondō 平等院観音堂; Byōdōin Kannondō	Byōdō-in	early Kamakura period	1			34°53′25″N 135°48′28″E	Structures	National (ICP)	
Jōdo-in Yōrin-an Shoin 浄土院養林庵書院; Jōdoin Yōrinan shoin	Jōdo-in	Momoyama period	1			34°53′23″N 135°48′18″E	Structures	National (ICP)	
*Ujigami Jinja Honden 宇治上神社本殿; Ujigami Jinja honden	Ujigami Jinja	late Heian period	1	Ujigami Jinja is inscribed on the UNESCO World Heritage List as one of the Historic Monuments of Ancient Kyoto (Kyoto, Uji and Otsu Cities)		34°53′31″N 135°48′41″E	Structures	National (NT)	
*Ujigami Jinja Haiden 宇治上神社拝殿; Ujigami Jinja haiden	Ujigami Jinja	early Kamakura period	1	Ujigami Jinja is inscribed on the UNESCO World Heritage List as one of the Historic Monuments of Ancient Kyoto (Kyoto, Uji and Otsu Cities)		34°53′31″N 135°48′41″E	Structures	National (NT)	
Ujigami Jinja Sessha Kasuga Jinja Honden 宇治上神社摂社春日神社本殿; Ujigami Jinja sessha Kasuga Jinja honden	Ujigami Jinja	late Kamakura period	1			34°53′31″N 135°48′42″E	Structures	National (ICP)	
Uji Jinja Honden 宇治神社本殿; Uji Jinja honden	Uji Jinja	late Kamakura period	1			34°53′28″N 135°48′39″E	Structures	National (ICP)	
Ukishima Thirteen-storey Stone Tō 浮島十三重塔; Ukishima jūsanjū-no-tō	Hōjō-in	late Kamakura period (1286)	1			34°53′18″N 135°48′37″E	Structures	National (ICP)	
Hakusan Jinja Haiden 白山神社拝殿; Hakusan Jinja haiden	Hakusan Jinja	late Kamakura period (1277)	1			34°52′38″N 135°48′46″E	Structures	National (ICP)	
Jūhachi Jinja Honden 十八神社本殿; Jūhachi Jinja honden	Jūhachi Jinja	late Muromachi period (1487)	1			34°54′03″N 135°49′09″E	Structures	National (ICP)	
Manpuku-ji 萬福寺; Manpukuji	Manpuku-ji	Edo period	16			34°54′50″N 135°48′27″E	Structures	National (ICP)	
Manpuku-ji Shōindō 萬福寺松隠堂; Manpukuji shōindō	Manpuku-ji	Edo period	7			34°54′52″N 135°48′23″E	Structures	National (ICP)	
Kohata Jinja Honden 許波多神社本殿; Kohata Jinja honden	Kohata Jinja	late Muromachi period (1562)	1			34°55′02″N 135°47′38″E	Structures	National (ICP)	
*Phoenix Hall Wall and Door Paintings 鳳凰堂中堂壁扉画（板絵著色） Hōōdō chūdō hekihiga (ita-e cho-iro)	Byōdō-in	Heian period (1053)	14				Paintings	National (NT)	
Honden Door Paintings 本殿扉絵（板絵著色） Honden tobira-e (ita-e cho-iro)	Ujigami Jinja	late Heian period	4				Paintings	National (ICP)	
Portrait of Ingen 紙本著色隠元和尚像〈元規筆／〉 shihon choshoku Ingen oshō zō (Genki fude)	Manpuku-ji	Edo period	1	colour on paper; by Kita Genki (喜多元規)			Paintings	National (ICP)	
Seated Wooden Statue of Amida Nyorai by Jōchō 木造阿弥陀如来坐像 定朝作 mokuzō Amida Nyorai zazō Jōchō-saku	Byōdō-in	Heian period (1053)	1			34°53′21″N 135°48′28″E	Sculptures	National (NT)	
Wooden Canopy 木造天蓋 mokuzō tengai	Byōdō-in	Heian period (1053)	1			34°53′21″N 135°48′28″E	Sculptures	National (NT)	
Bosatsu on Clouds 木造雲中供養菩薩像 mokuzō unchū kuyō bosatsu-zō	Byōdō-in	Heian period (1053)	52			34°53′21″N 135°48′28″E	Sculptures	National (NT)	
*Temple Bell 梵鐘 bonshō	Byōdō-in	Heian period	1	now at the Kyoto National Museum		34°59′24″N 135°46′25″E	Applied; Crafts	National (NT)	
*Gilt bronze phoenices from the Phoenix Hall 金銅鳳凰（鳳凰堂中堂旧棟飾） kondō hōō (Hōōdō chūdō kyū-munekazari)	Byōdō-in	Heian period	1 pair	now at the Kyoto National Museum		34°59′24″N 135°46′25″E	Applied; Crafts	National (NT)	
Iron half-tongue stirrups with copper-inlaid hōsōge and peacock design 鉄宝相華孔雀銅象嵌半舌鐙 tetsu hōsōge kujaku dōzōgan hanjita abumi	Kohata Jinja	Heian period	1 pair				Applied; Crafts	National (ICP)	
Temple Bell 梵鐘 bonshō	Shōmyō-ji	early Kamakura period (1210)	1			34°56′14″N 135°52′21″E	Applied; Crafts	National (ICP)	
Fragmentary Stele from Uji Bridge 宇治橋断碑; Uji-bashi danpi	Hōjō-in	Asuka period (646)	1				Calligraphic works	National (ICP)	
Manpuku-ji Miscellany 黄檗山木額・柱聯・榜牌; Ōbaku-san kigaku chūren bōhai	Manpuku-ji	Edo period	97	designation comprises 40 wooden tablets, 44 pillar inscriptions, and 13 plaques			Calligraphic works	National (ICP)	
Manpuku-ji Miscellany 同下書 dō shitagaki	Manpuku-ji	Edo period	14	designation comprises 14 sketches			Calligraphic works	National (ICP)	
Complete Woodblock Sutras (Tetsugen edition) 鉄眼版一切経版木; Tetsugen-ban issaikyō hangi	Hōzō-in	Edo period	48,275				Historic materials	National (ICP)	
Woodworking 木工芸; Moku-kōgei	Individual		1	holder of technique: Murayama Akira (村山明)			Intangible	National	
Byōdō-in Gardens 平等院庭園; Byōdōin teien	Byōdō-in		1	also a Place of Scenic Beauty		34°53′21″N 135°48′46″E	Historic; Sites	National	
Hayaagari Tile Kiln Site 隼上り瓦窯跡; Hayaagari kawara kama ato	Uji City		1			34°54′23″N 135°48′35″E	Historic; Sites	National	
Uji River Taikō Embankment 宇治川太閤堤跡; Uji-gawa Taikō-zuzumi ato	Uji City		1			34°53′46″N 135°48′18″E	Historic; Sites	National	
Cultural Landscape of Uji 宇治の文化的景観; Uji no bunkateki keikan	Uji City		1			34°53′14″N 135°48′30″E	Cultural; Landscapes	National	
Kiku-jutsu (modern) 規矩術 (近世規矩) kiku-jutsu (kinsei-kiku)	Individual		1	for architectural measurement; holder of technique: Mochida Takeo (持田武夫)			Conservation; Techniques	National	
Mimuroto-ji Hondō 三室戸寺本堂; Mimurotoji Hondō	Mimuroto-ji	Edo period (1814)	1			34°54′02″N 135°49′09″E	Structures	Prefectural	
Mimuroto-ji Three-storey Pagoda 三室戸寺三重塔; Mimurotoji sanjū-no-tō	Mimuroto-ji	Edo period (1704)	1			34°54′01″N 135°49′11″E	Structures	Prefectural	
Mimuroto-ji Old Bracket Block 三室戸寺旧鬼斗; Mimurotoji kyū-onito	Mimuroto-ji	Edo period	1				Structures	Prefectural	
Mimuroto-ji Old Tail Rafter 三室戸寺旧尾垂木; Mimurotoji kyū-odaruki	Mimuroto-ji	Edo period	1				Structures	Prefectural	
Mimuroto-ji Old Hondō Kaerumata 三室戸寺旧本堂蟇股; Mimurotoji kyū-hondō kaerumata	Mimuroto-ji	Edo period	1				Structures	Prefectural	
Manpuku-ji Precinct 萬福寺境内; Manpukuji keidai	Manpuku-ji		1			34°54′51″N 135°48′22″E	Historic; Sites	Prefectural	
Kōshō-ji Gardens and Kotosaka 興聖寺庭園および琴坂; Kōshōji teien oyobi Kotosaka	Kōshō-ji		1			34°53′24″N 135°48′49″E	Places of Scenic; Beauty	Prefectural	
Yūrin-an Shoin Gardens 養林庵書院庭園; Yūrin-an shoin teien	Yūrin-an		1			34°53′19″N 135°48′25″E	Places of Scenic; Beauty	Prefectural	
Jōdo-in Rakan-dō 浄土院羅漢堂; Jōdo-in rakandō	Jōdo-in	Edo period (1640)	1			34°53′21″N 135°48′25″E	Structures	Municipal	

== Registered Cultural Properties ==
Property	Owner	Date	No. of Assets	Comments	Image	Coordinates	Type	Level	Ref.
Orii Jinja Honden 下居神社本殿; Orii Jinja honden	Orii Jinja	Edo period (1656)	1			34°52′48″N 135°48′04″E	Structures	Prefectural	
Asakura Jinja Honden 旦椋神社本殿; Asakura Jinja honden	Asakura Jinja	Edo period (1674)	1			34°52′21″N 135°46′30″E	Structures	Prefectural	
Mimuroto-ji Amidadō 三室戸寺阿弥陀堂; Mimurotoji Amidadō	Mimuroto-ji	Edo period (1747)	1			34°54′02″N 135°49′09″E	Structures	Prefectural	
Mimuroto-ji Shōrō 三室戸寺鐘楼; Mimurotoji Shōrō	Mimuroto-ji	Edo period (1689)	1			34°54′01″N 135°49′10″E	Structures	Prefectural	

== See also ==
- Cultural Properties of Japan
