= Kegon-ji =

Buddhist temple in Ibigawa, Gifu, Japan

- 華厳寺
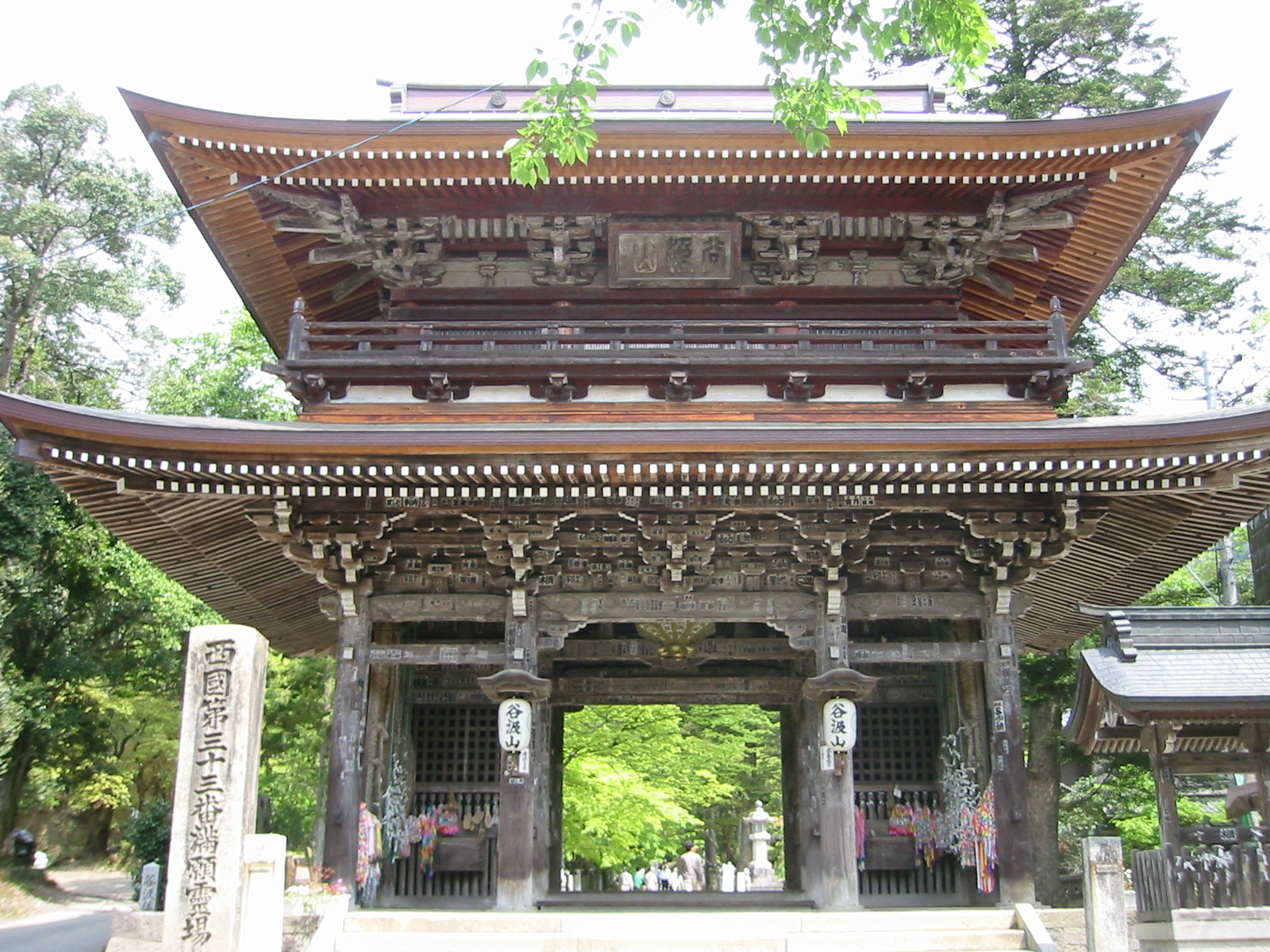
- Kegon-ji Niomon

- Location within Gifu Prefecture Location within Japan

Religion
- Affiliation: Buddhist
- Deity: Jūichimen Kannon
- Rite: Tendai
- Status: functional

Location
- Location: 23 Tanigumi Tokuzumi, Ibigawa-cho, Ibi-gun, Gifu-ken 501-1311
- Coordinates: 35°32′13.9″N 136°36′28.4″E

Architecture
- Founder: c.Ōguchi Dairyō
- Completed: c.798

Website
- Official website
- National Important Cultural Property

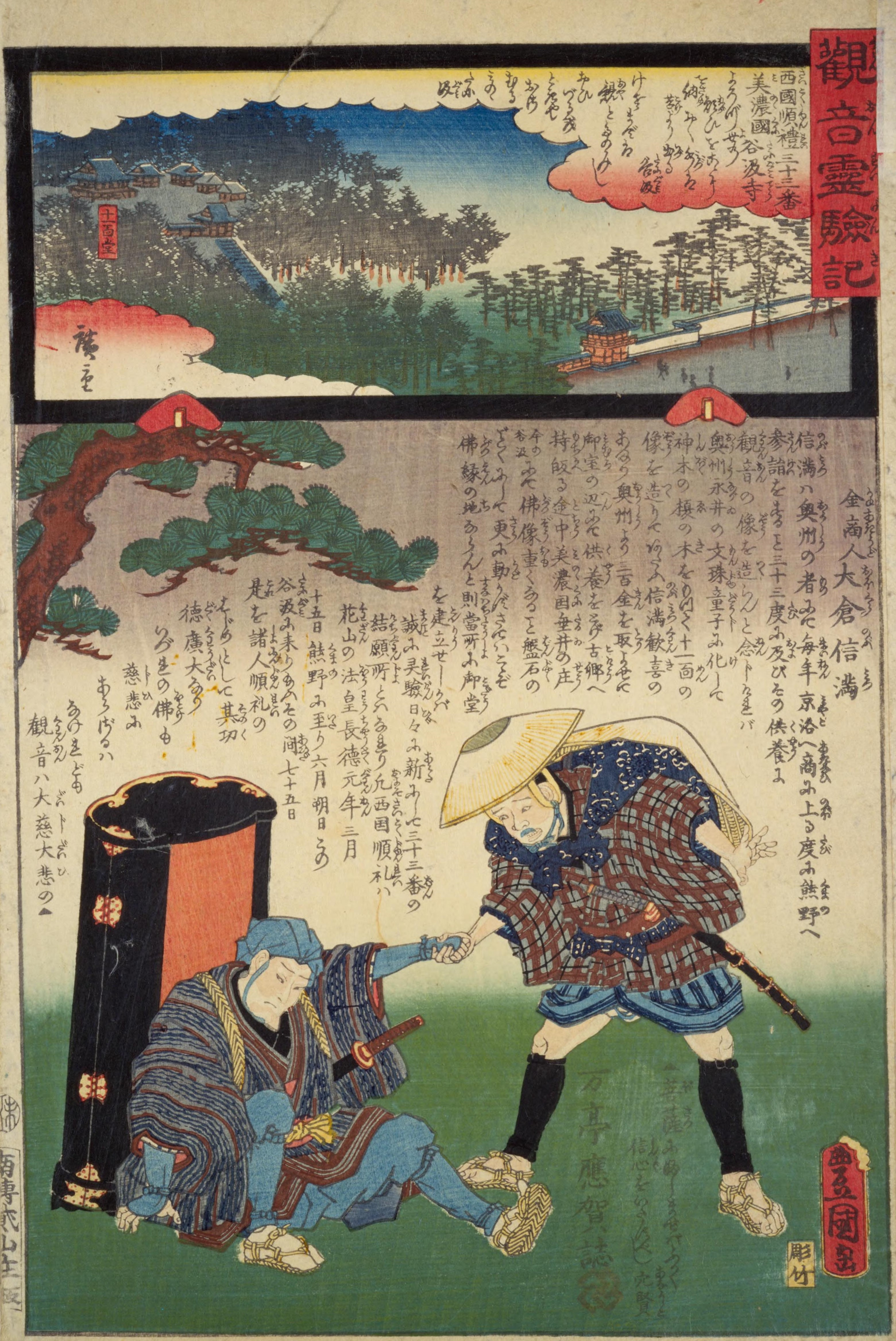
from the picture album "Kannon Reigen ki"

Kegon-ji (華厳寺) is a Buddhist temple located in the Tanigumi Tokuzumi neighborhood of the town of Ibigawa, Gifu Prefecture, Japan. It belongs to the Tendai sect of Japanese Buddhism and its honzon is a hibutsu image of Jūichimen Kannon. The temple's full name is Tanigumi-san Kegon-ji (谷汲山 華厳寺).The temple is the 33rd and final stop on the Saigoku Kannon Pilgrimage route, and is the only temple on the route outside of the Kansai region.

== History ==
According to the "Yaguriki" (1560 Eiroku 3rd year), this temple was founded in 798 by a man named Ōguchi Dairyō from Kurokawa-gō (present-day Aizuwakamatsu, Fukushima), who was the county governor of Aizu in Mutsu Province.

=== Legend of the walking Kannon statue ===
According to the "Yaguriki," Ōguchi Dairyō secluded himself in the Monjū-dō Hall in Mutsu Province and made a vow to obtain a sacred tree in order to carve a statue. After seven days of ascetic practice, at dawn on the seventh day, a 14-year-old boy (known as Monjū Daishi) appeared and revealed where he would be able to obtain the sacred tree. Having found the necessary sacred tree, Ōguchi Dairyō commissioned a Buddhist sculptor in the Heian-kyō to create a statue of the Jūichimen Kannon, a deity he worshipped. In 798, Ōguchi Tairyō was returning to Aizu with the completed Kannon statue.

As the journey progressed, that statue started to move, and cut a nearby wisteria vine to use as a walking stick. It then put on a straw hat and began walking under its own power. However, in Akasaka, Mino Province (present-day Ōgaki, Gifu), the statue stopped moving and then declared, "I will not go to the faraway land of Ōshū. I will find a place of enlightenment in the mountains five ri north of here, and there I will save all living beings."

Heading north, away from Ōshū, the statue stopped moving after five ri and did not move a single step further. Ōguchi Tairyō believed that this must be the place of enlightenment, and together with the monk Hōzen, who had lived in a hermitage in the mountains, built a temple and enshrined the Kannon statue there. This is said to be the beginning of the temple.

=== In historical records ===
The temple first appears in documentary history in 917, when Emperor Daigo bestowed the sangō "Tanigumi-san" and a plaque reading "Kegon-ji."

In 944, Emperor Suzaku designated the temple as a place of imperial prayer for the protection of the nation, and granted it 15,000 koku of Buddhist altar equipment and rice paddies. The alternate name "Yagumi-san" comes from the fact that oil gushed forth from the valley near the temple, never running out, no matter how much oil was drawn for the lamps in front of the Buddha.

Cloistered Emperor Kazan, who restored the Saigoku Kannon Pilgrimage, toured the sacred sites on foot and it is claimed that he designated this temple as the 33rd and final temple of the pilgrimage. However, in the "Gyosonden" and "Kakuchūden" sections of the "Jimon Kōsō-ki," the oldest historical document mentioning the pilgrimage, the 33rd sacred site is listed as Mimuroto-ji. Kegon-ji was not even listed as one of the pilgrimage temples in 1161, when Kakuchū, a monk from Mii-dera made the pilgrimage. Furthermore, one of the three Gōeika (poems) associated with the temple is known to have been written by Kakuchū, not Emperor Kazan.

During the Kamakura period, Emperor Go-Shirakawa, following in what he believed to be Emperor Kazan's footsteps, toured the temple with over 1,000 companions.

During the Jōkyū War of 1221, the temple's lands were confiscated for siding with the Imperial Court. When war broke out between the Ashikaga and Nitta clans in 1334, the temple's buildings were burned down several times, but the principal image and attendant statues were moved into the mountains to escape the disaster. The temple fell into decline, but in 1479, Doha Jikkoku, the head priest of Jigen-ji in Kagoshima, Satsuma Province, rebuilt the Main Hall and other buildings after receiving a message in a dream from Kannon.

The current Main Hall is located approximately one kilometer uphill from the Niōmon gate. It was rebuilt in 1879.

The principal image Jūichimen Kannon is kept strictly as a hibutsu secret statue and no photographs have been made public, so details such as its date of creation and structure are unknown. Until the Meiji era, the statue was opened to the public every 33 years, and from the Taishō era to 1955, it was opened to the public once every seven years, but since then regular openings have not been held. According to the account of an art historian, Kunō Takeshi, who saw the principal image, the Jūchimen Kannon statue is made from a single piece of Japanese hackberry wood, is 7 feet 5 inches tall, has the Kegon-kyō Sutra written on its body, and depicts the 3,000 Buddhas and the Sammaya forms of the various Buddhas on its robes, making it a unique statue.

== Temple layout ==
The inner sanctuary is connected to the back of the outer sanctuary, which has a gabled roof and is five bays in front and four bays on the sides. The principal image Jūichimen Kannon is flanked by statues of Fudo Myōō (an Important Cultural Property (ICP)) and Bishamonten (ICP) (neither are open to the public). Inside the hall, there is a sutra office on the right, and in the basement is are bronze carp known as "Shōjin-otoshi no Koi" (carp for vegetarian sacrifices) are nailed to the left and right pillars of the main veranda. Those who complete the Saigoku Kannon Pilgrimage at this temple, have the custom of touching these carp to commemorate their achievement.

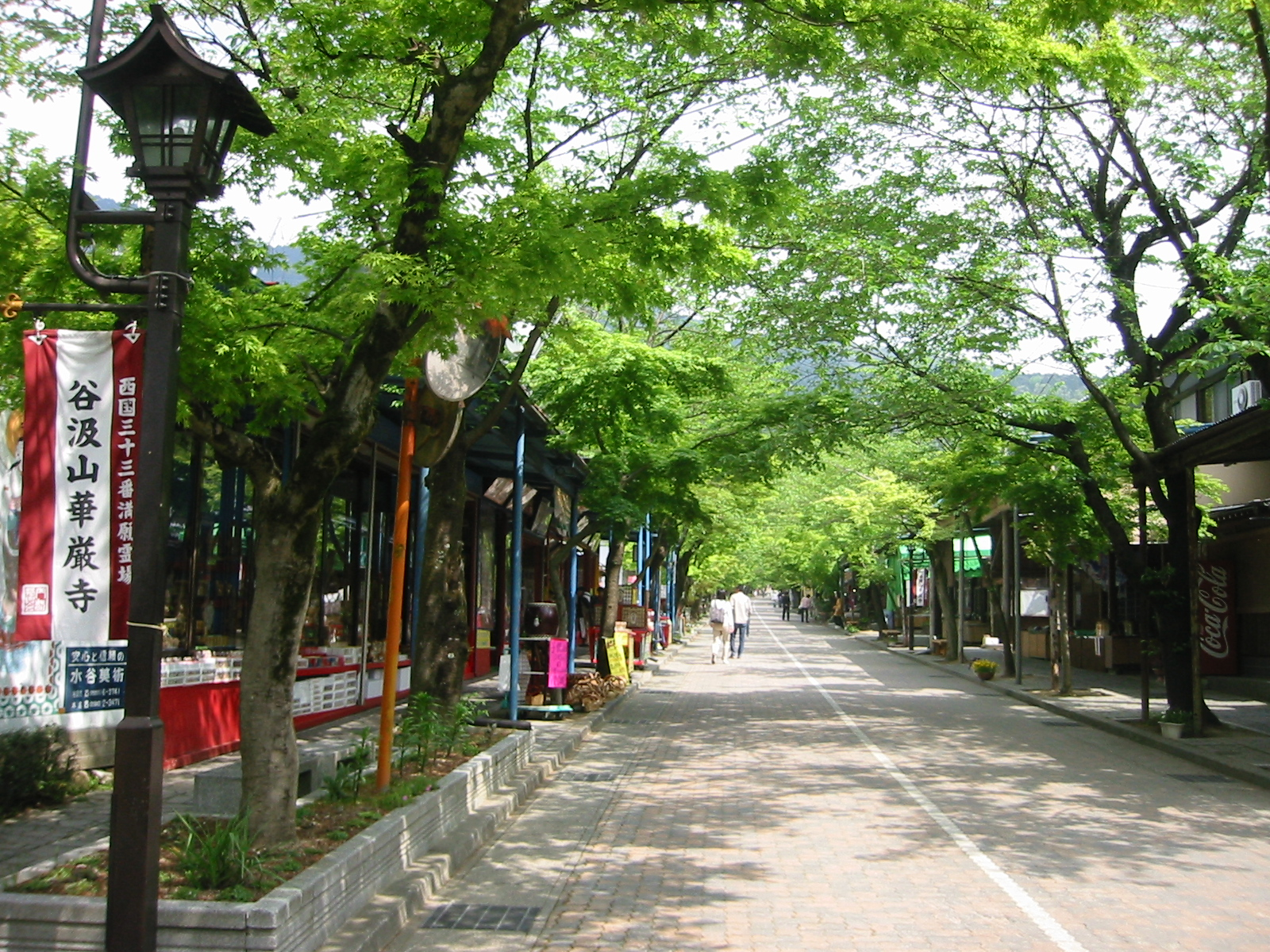
Approach

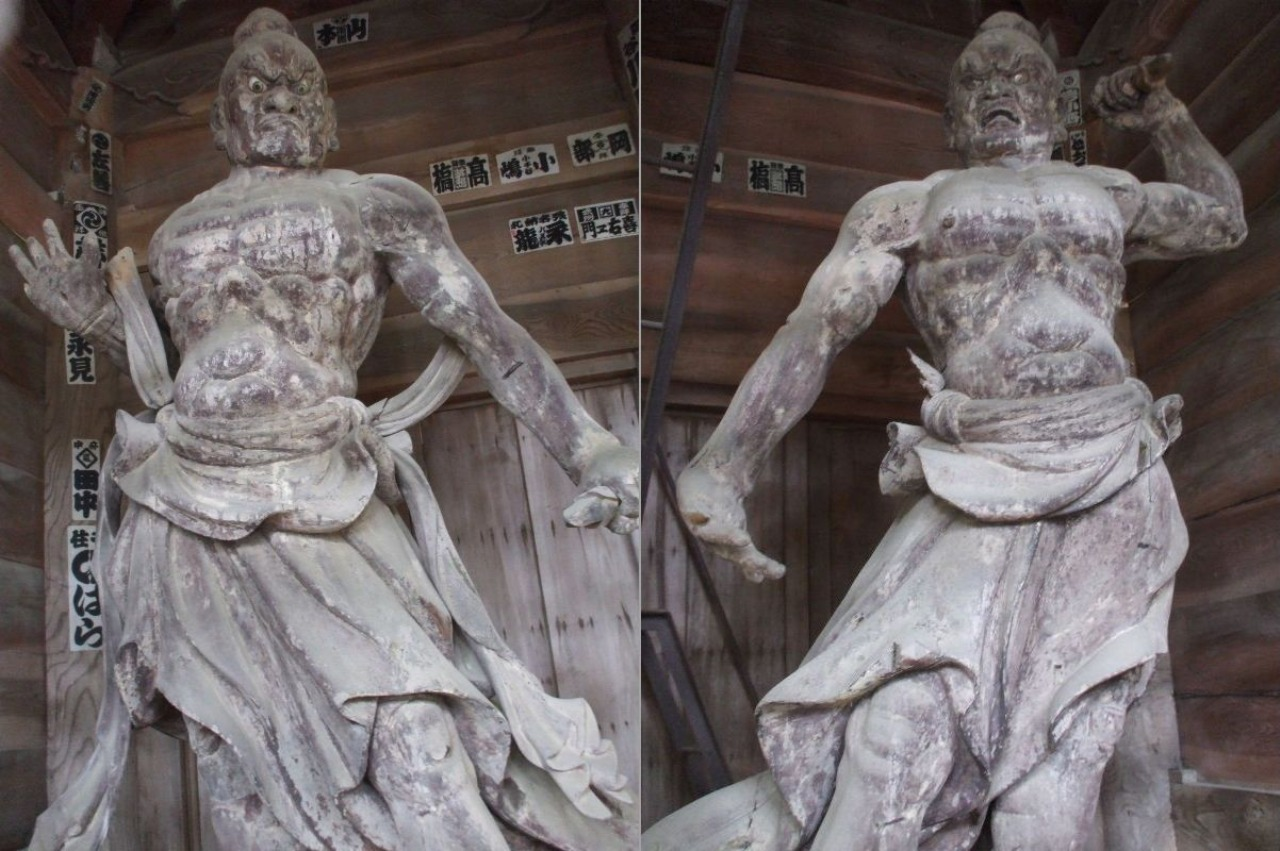
Niō statues

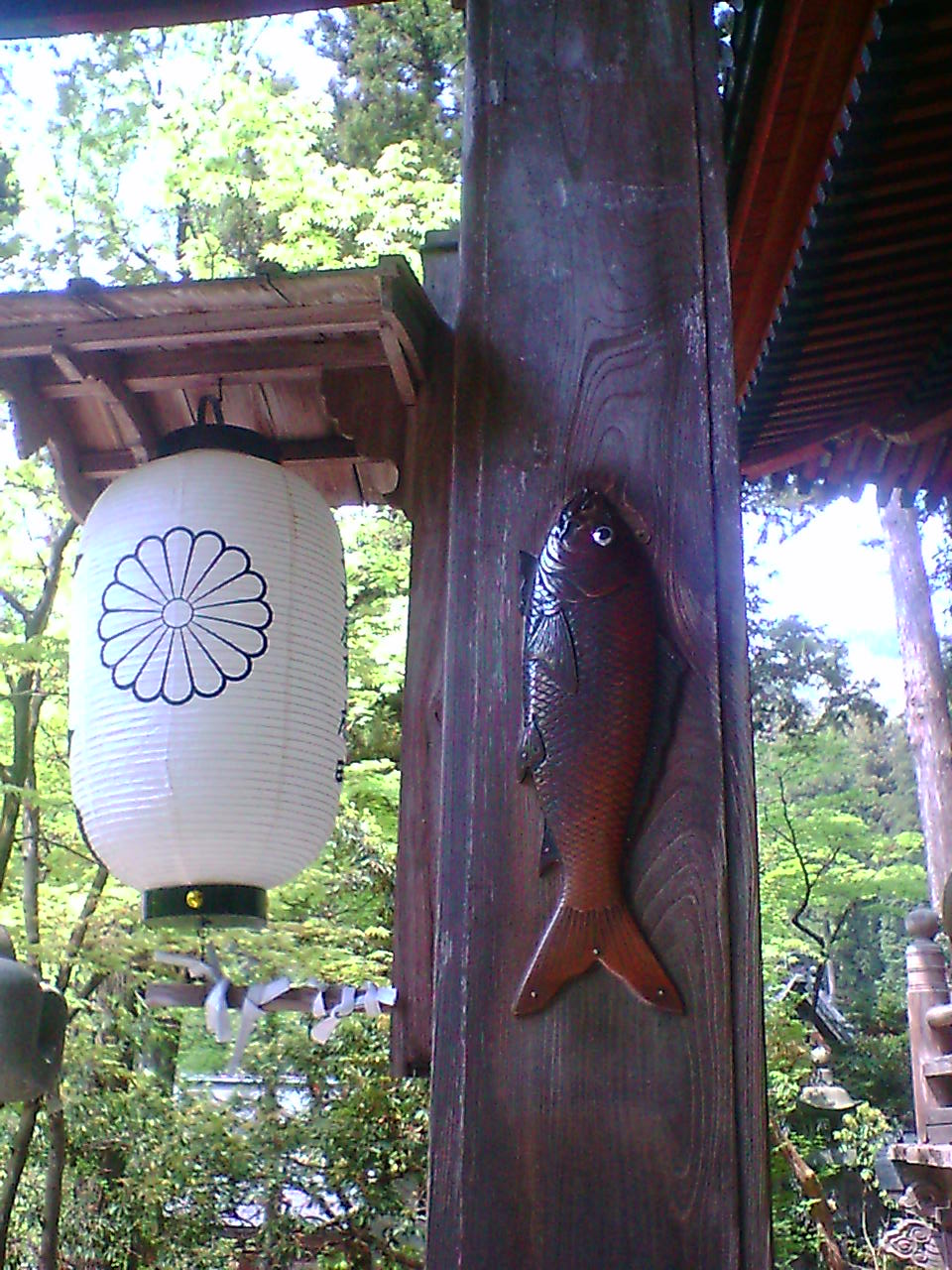
Bronze carp

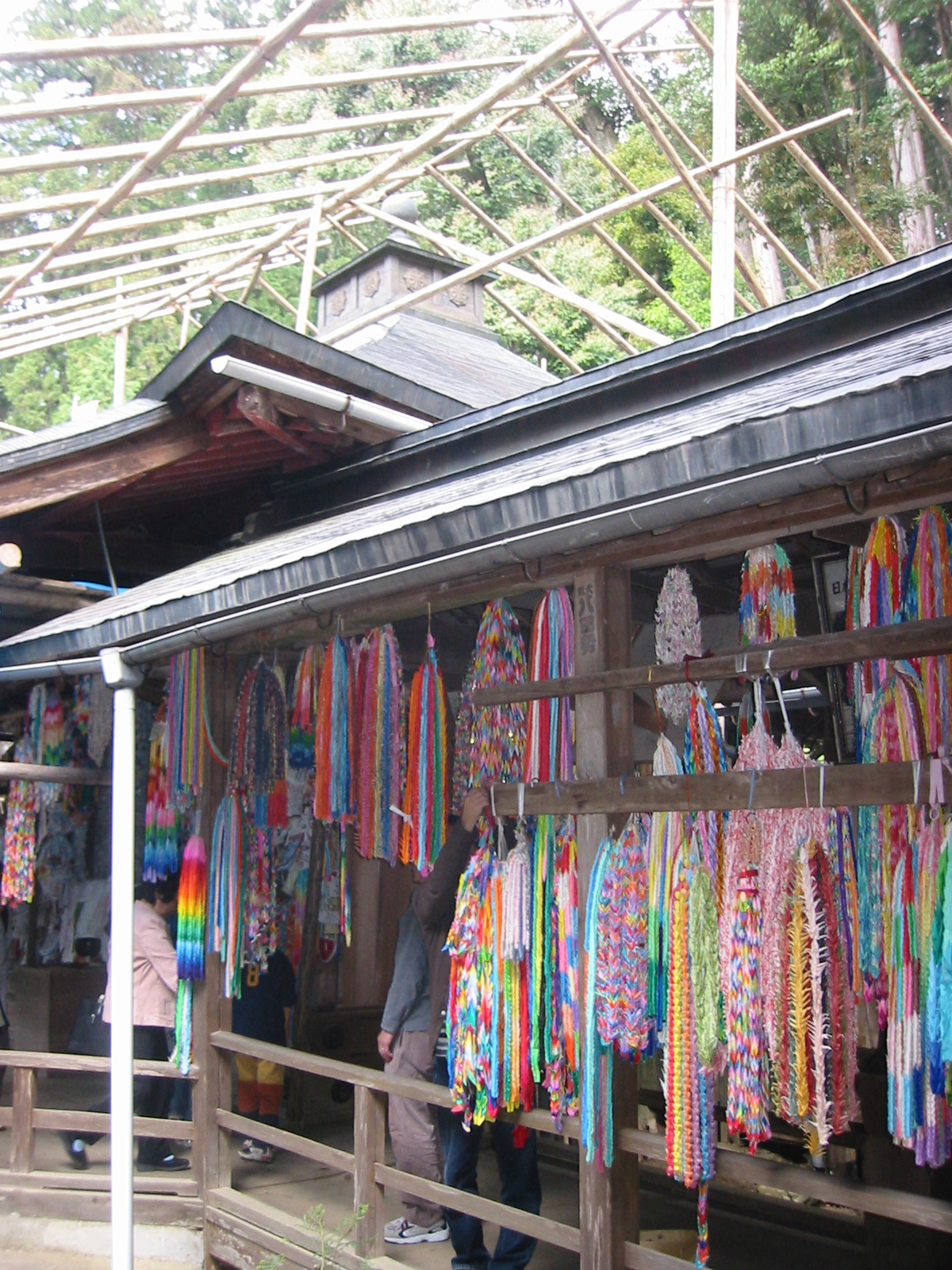
Shizu-dō

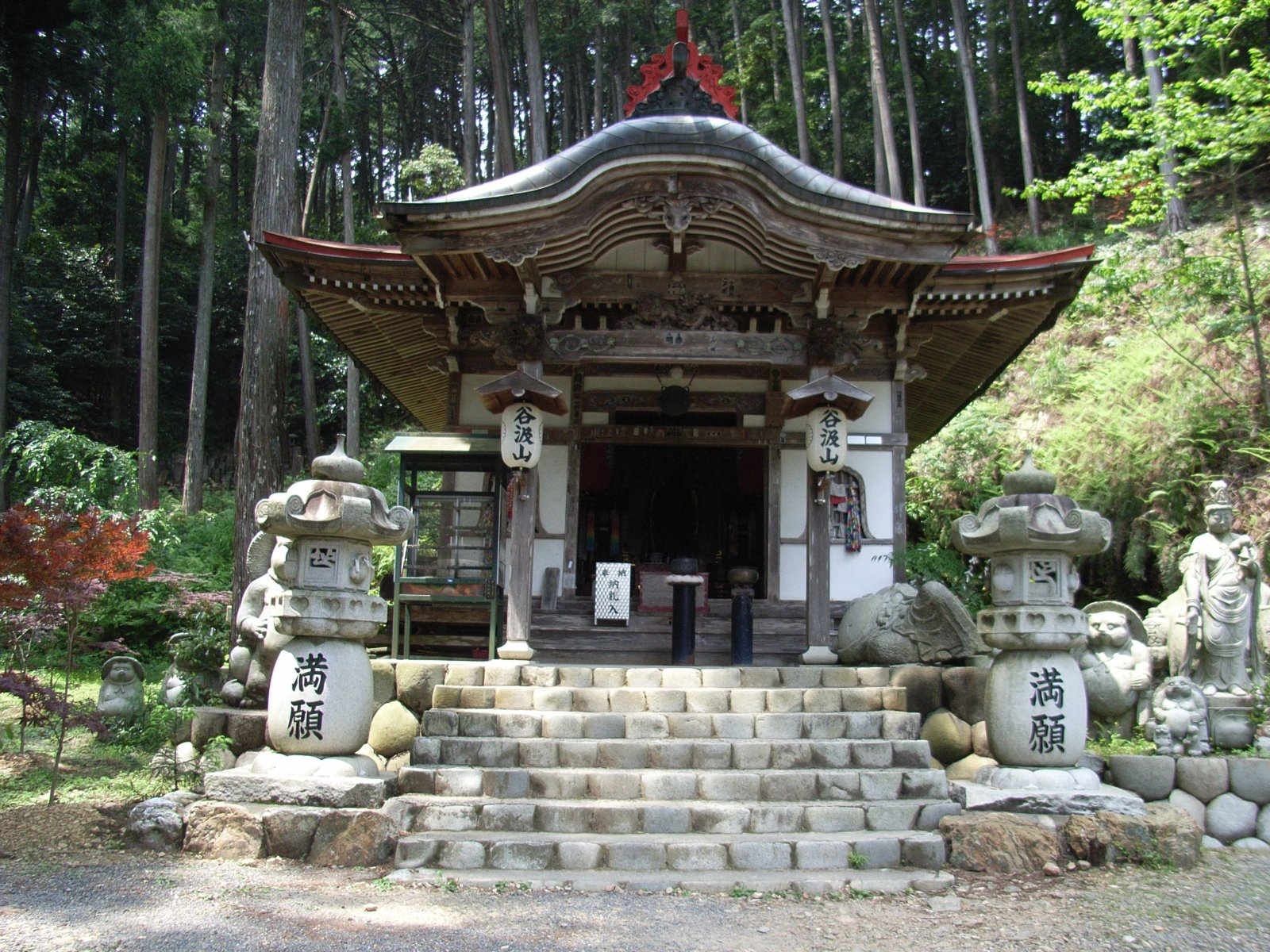
Mangan-dō

== Access ==
The Rōmon gate, marking the entrance to the temple grounds, is located about a 10-minute walk from JR West Kimiidera Station.

== Cultural Properties ==
=== National Important Cultural Properties ===
- Wooden statue of standing Bishamon-ten (木造毘沙門天立像), early Heian period (c.9th century); 168.2 cm tall
- Silk painting of 33 Kannon Mandala (絹本著色三十三所観音曼荼羅), Kamakura period (13th-14th century); 187.1 1x 144.3 cm Records from the first half of the 13th century detail the order of the pilgrimage to the Thirty-three Temples, beginning at Hase-dera and concluding at Mimuroto-ji, and this statue was painted based on this. A distinctive feature of the image is the accurate depiction of statues that have long been famous as sacred Kannon sites, suggesting that traditional iconography dating back to the Heian period had been accumulating in the background.
