= Kōan (Kamakura period) =

Period of Japanese history (1278–1288 CE)

Kōan 弘安
- February 1278 – April 1288
Kenji	Shōō
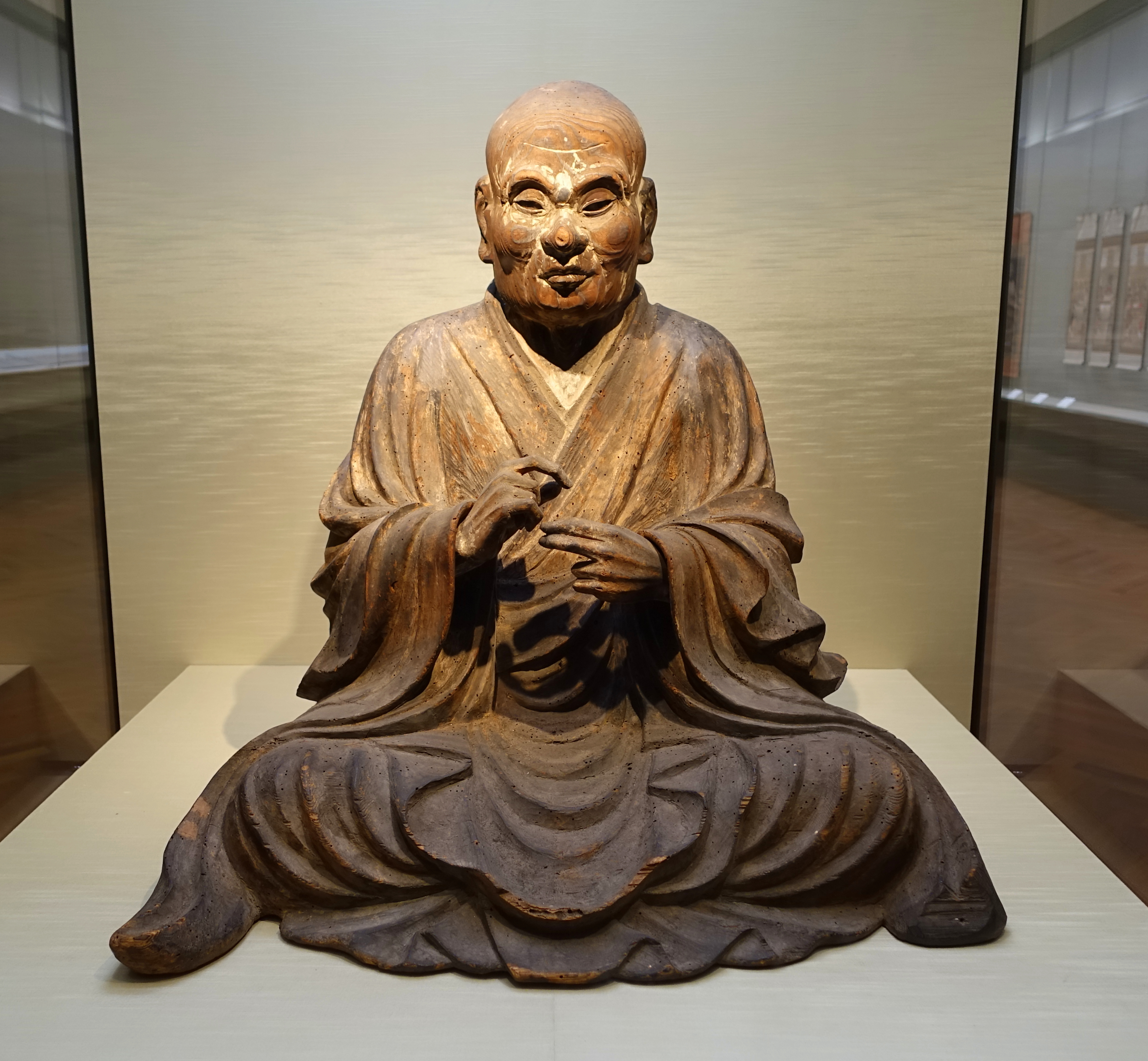
- Seated Jie Daishi, depicting Ryōgen (AD 912–985), sculpted in 1286
- Location: Japan
- Monarch(s): Emperor Go-Uda (to November 1287); Emperor Fushimi (from November 1287)

Kōan (弘安) was a Japanese era name (年号, nengō; lit. "year name") after Kenji and before Shōō. This period spanned the years from February 1278 through April 1288. The reigning emperors were Go-Uda-tennō (後宇多天皇) and Fushimi-tennō (伏見天皇).

== Change of era ==
- 1278 Kōan gannen (弘安元年): The new era name was created to mark an event or a number of events. The previous era ended and a new one commenced in Kenji 4. The era name comes from the Veritable Records of the Emperor Taizong of Tang and combines the characters 弘 ("broad") and 安 ("peaceful"). It should not be confused with the later Kōan era of 1361–62, which used a different character for kō (康, "peace").

== Events of the Kōan era ==
- August 15, 1281 (Kōan 4, 7th day of the intercalary 7th month): Battle of Kōan -- The second Mongol invasion of Japan is foiled, as a large typhoon – famously called a kamikaze, or divine wind – destroys much of the combined Chinese and Korean fleet and forces, numbering over 140,000 men and 4,000 ships.
- November 27, 1287 (Kōan 10, 21st day of the 10th month): In the 14th year of Go-Uda-tennō's reign (後宇多天皇14年), the emperor abdicated; and the succession (‘‘senso’’) was received by his cousin. Shortly thereafter, Emperor Fushimi is said to have acceded to the throne (‘‘sokui’’).

== See also ==
- Mongol invasions of Japan
- Battle of Bun'ei - the first invasion attempt by Kublai Khan, in 1274.

== Notes ==
Preceded by Kenji	Era or nengō Kōan; 1278–1288	Succeeded by Shōō
