= Ryōgen =

Japanese Buddhist monk (912–985)

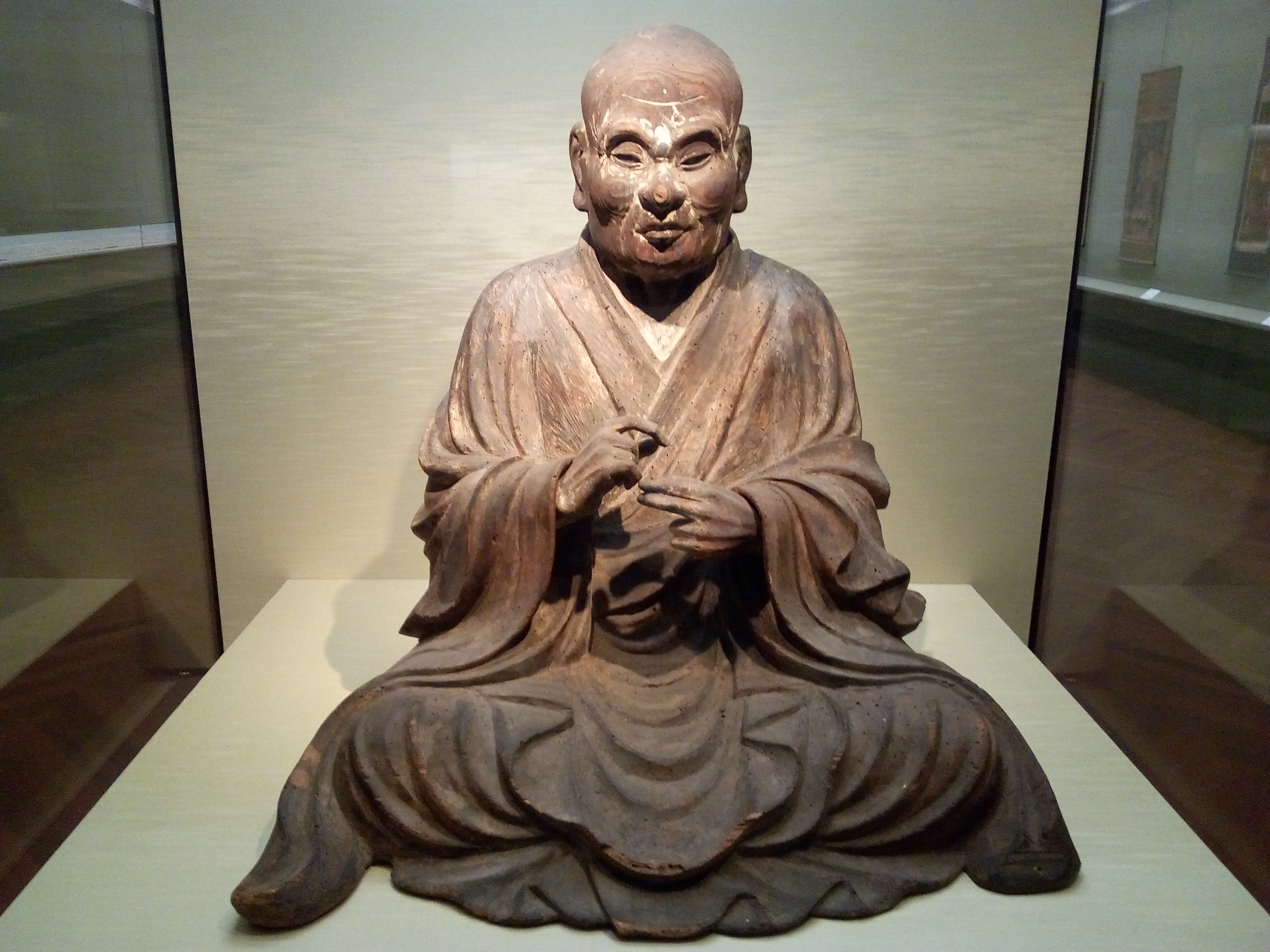
Seated Jie Daishi, a portrait sculpture of Ryōgen, owned by Kongōrin-ji temple in Aishō, Shiga. Designated an Important Cultural Property.

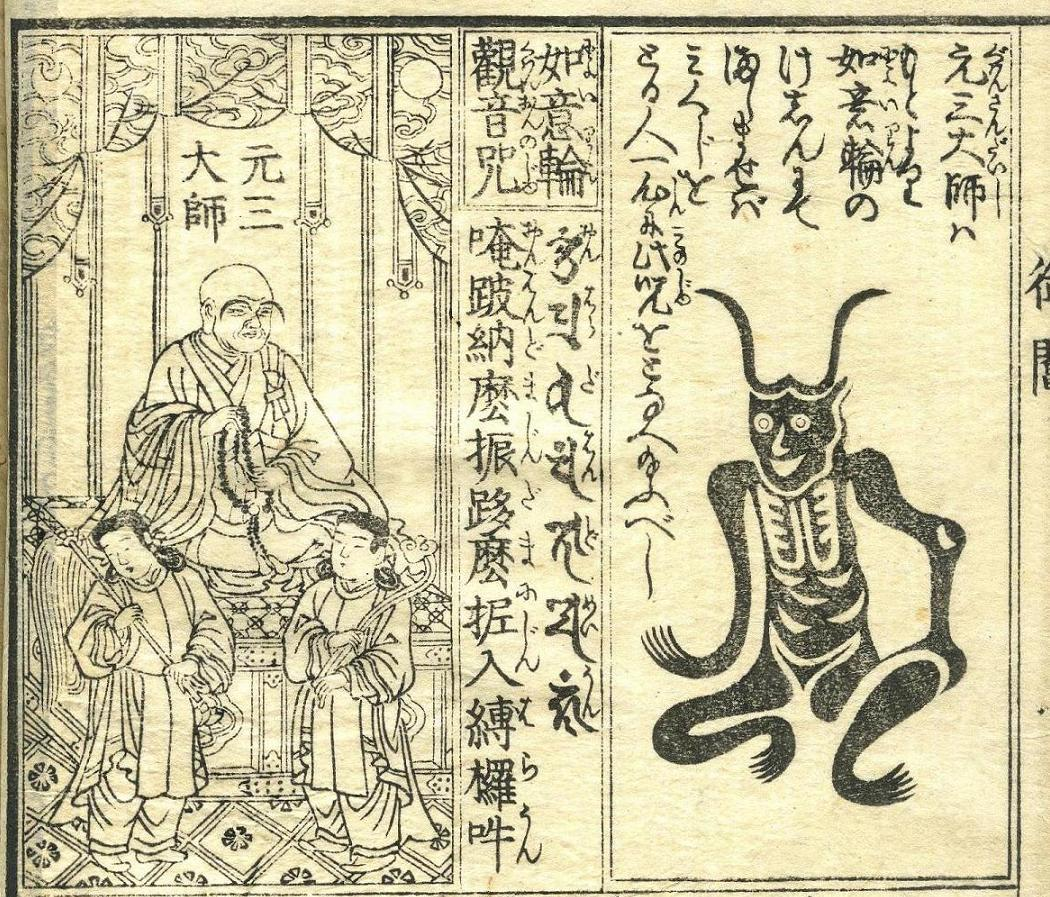
Ryōgen is known generally by the names of Ganzan Daishi (left) or Tsuno Daishi (right). The figure of Tsuno Daishi (Horned Great Master) is said to be a portrait of him subjugating vengeful ghosts

Ryōgen (良源; 912 – January 31, 985) was the 18th chief abbot of Enryaku-ji in the 10th century.

He is considered a restorer of the Tendai school of Mahayana Buddhism, and credited for reviving Enryaku-ji. His supposed role as a precursor of the sōhei or "warrior monks" is questionable and seems to be a later invention.

== Life ==
Ryōgen was born in the Omi Province in 912, and he began his practice at Mount Hiei in 923, becoming chief abbot in 966.

Over the course of the 10th century, there had been a number of disputes between Enryaku-ji and the other temples and shrines of the Kyoto area, many of which were resolved by force. In 970, Ryōgen formed a small army to defend Enryaku-ji and to serve its interests in these disputes. Records are not fully clear on whether this army consisted of hired mercenaries, or, as would be the case later, trained monks. Most likely, this first temple standing army was a mercenary group, separate from the monks, since Ryōgen forbade monks from carrying weapons.

In addition to the prohibition on carrying weapons, Ryōgen's monks were subject to a list of 26 articles released by Ryōgen in 970; they were forbidden from covering their faces, inflicting corporal punishment, violently interrupting prayer services, or leaving Mount Hiei during their twelve-year training.

In 981 Ryōgen was appointed general administrator, the most important rank in priesthood.

Ryōgen also wrote a Pure Land text, On the Nine Grades of Birth into the Pure Land of Supreme Bliss (Gokuraku jōdo kuhon ōjōgi 極樂淨土九品往生義). This text is based on the Tiantai Guan-wuliangshou-fojing-shu (Commentary on the Contemplation Sutra), traditionally attributed to Zhiyi, which describes the practice of Buddha contemplation (guanfo) extensively.
