= Seated Jie Daishi =

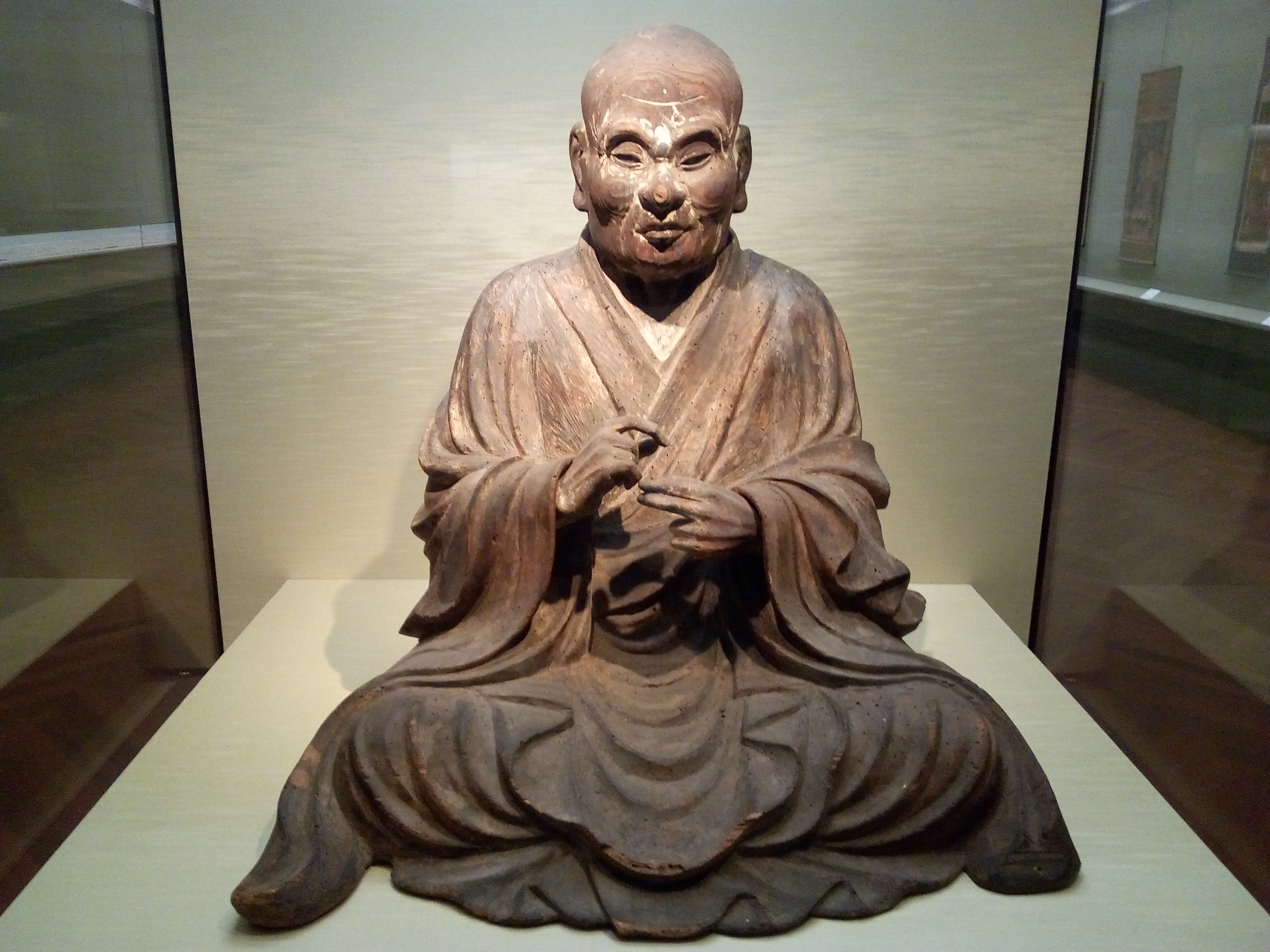
- Artist: Unknown
- Year: 1286 (Kamakura period)
- Type: Wooden sculpture, polychromy and inlaid crystal eyes
- Dimensions: 83.3 cm (32.8 in)
- Designation: Important Cultural Property
- Location: Kongōrin-ji; Aishō, Shiga, Japan

Seated Jie Daishi (慈恵大師坐像) is an anonymous wooden sculpture dated from 1286 depicting Jie Daishi (Priest Ryōgen), property of the Kongōrin-ji temple in Aishō, Shiga. It is designated an Important Cultural Property.

Ryōgen (912–985), also known as Jie Daishi, was the 18th chief abbot of Enryaku-ji, the head Tendai monastery located on Mount Hiei in Ōtsu. He is considered a restorer of the Tendai school of Mahayana Buddhism, and credited for reviving Enryaku-ji. It was Ryōgen's son Renmyo who requested the creation of a posthumous portrait of his father, in prayer for his rebirth in the Pure Land, the celestial realm in Mahayana Buddhism.

The sculpture was created during the Kamakura period (1185-1333), an era famous for its sculpture. It is currently owned by the Kongōrin-ji temple, one of the three Koto Sanzan temples of the Tendai school.

The sculpture is often on display in Room 3 of the Honkan (Japanese Gallery) of the Tokyo National Museum. The last time was from July 11 to October 1 of 2017. It was previously on exhibit in 2014 (July 23 to August 31), and in 2012 (April 24 to July 16).
