= Kenji (era) =

Period of Japanese history (1275–1278 CE)

Kenji 建治
- April 1275 – February 1278
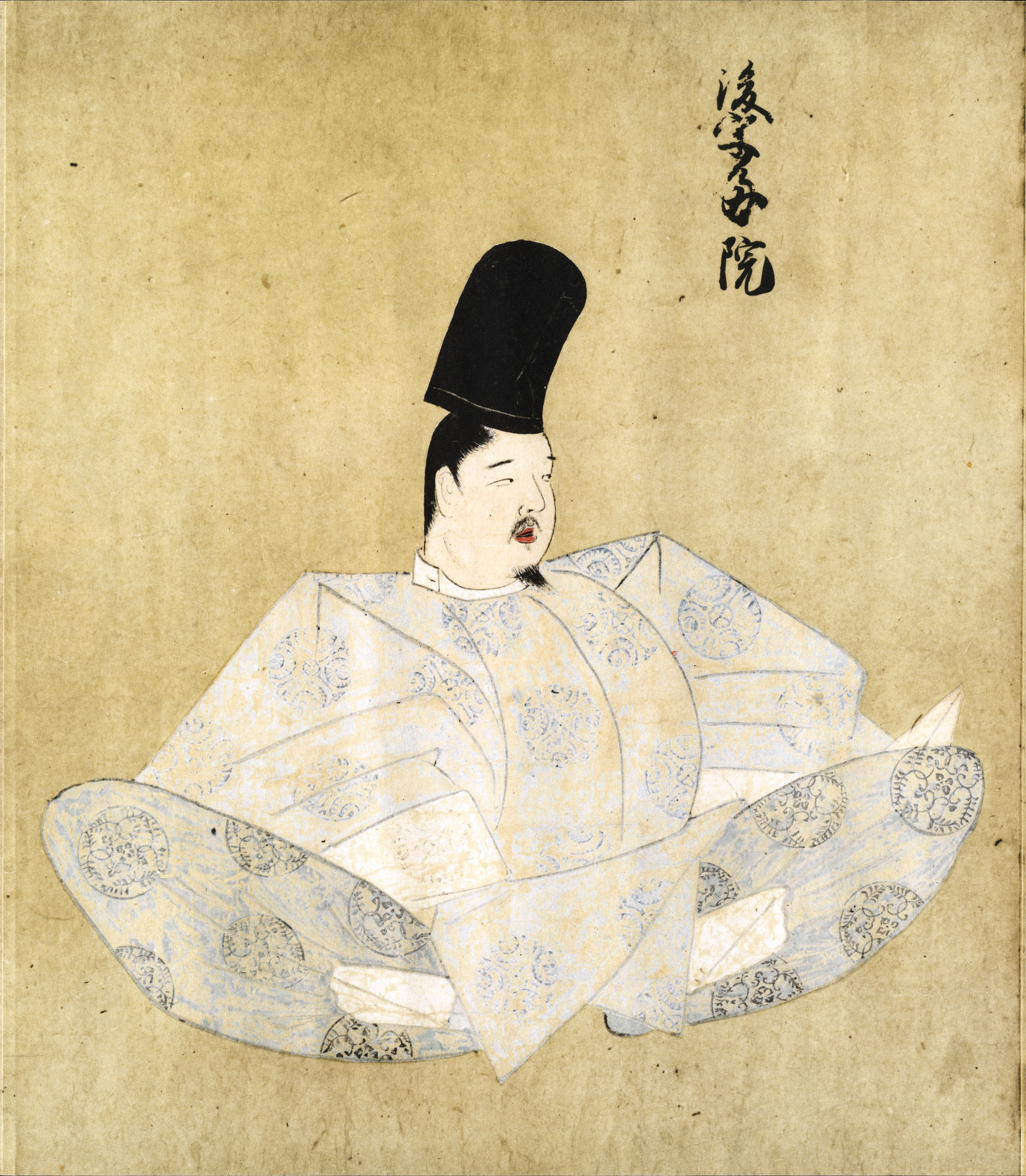
- Emperor Go-Uda
- Location: Japan
- Monarch(s): Emperor Go-Uda

Kenji (建治) is a Japanese era name (年号, nengō, lit. "year name") which followed Bun'ei and preceded Kōan. This period spanned the years from April 1275 to February 1278. The reigning emperor was Go-Uda-tennō (後宇多天皇).

== Change of era ==
- 1275 Kenji gannen (建治元年): The new era name was created to mark an event or a number of events. The previous era ended and a new one commenced in Bun'ei 12. The era name comes from the Rites of Zhou and combines the characters 建 ("build, establish") and 治 ("govern").

== Events of the Kenji era ==
- 1275 (Kenji 1): The Mongols sent an ambassador to Kamakura along with the delegation which accompanied the envoy from the Goryeo. The unwelcome visitor was put to death; and his severed head was publicly displayed.
- November 23, 1275 (Kenji 1, 5th day of the 11th month): Hirohito-shinnō was named Crown Prince and heir to his first cousin, the Daikakuji-tō Emperor Go-Uda. This was the result of political maneuvering by Hirohito's father, the Jimyōin-tō Emperor Go-Fukakusa.
- 1277 (Kenji 3, 5th month): Yoshimasa laid down his office.

== Notes ==
Preceded by Bun'ei	Era or nengō Kenji; 1275–1278	Succeeded by Kōan
