= Hayaagari Tile Kiln Site =

Archaeological site in Japan

Hayaagari Tile Kiln ruins
- 隼上り瓦窯跡 (Japanese)
- Hayaagari Tile Kiln ruins Hayaagari Tile Kiln Site (Japan)
- Interactive map of Hayaagari Tile Kiln ruins
- 34°54′22.1″N 135°48′35.0″E
- Periods: Nara period
- Location: Uji, Kyoto, Japan
- Region: Kinai region

Site notes
- Public access: Yes (public park)

The Hayaagari Tile Kiln ruins (隼上り瓦窯跡, Hayaagari kawara gama ato) is an archaeological site with the ruins of a Nara period kiln, located in the Udo neighborhood of the city of Uji, Kyoto Prefecture in the Kinai region of Japan. It was designated a National Historic Site of Japan in 1986.

== Overview ==
Kawara (瓦) roof tiles made of fired clay were introduced to Japan from Baekche during the 6th century along with Buddhism. During the 570s under the reign of Emperor Bidatsu, the king of Baekche sent six people to Japan skilled in various aspects of Buddhism, including a temple architect. Initially, tiled roofs were a sign of great wealth and prestige, and used for temple and government buildings. The material had the advantages of great strength and durability, and could also be made at locations around the country wherever clay was available.

The Hayaagari Tile Kiln was located approximately 1.5 km (0.93 mi) northeast of Uji Bridge in the middle reaches of the Uji River in southern Kyoto Prefecture, on the southern slope of a hill that extends from east-to-west. The remains were found during the development of a housing complex and consist of the remains of four kilns, a workshop, and an ash field. The archaeological excavation conducted in 1982 found that Goguryeo-style eaves tiles at this site are identical to those found at the ruins of Toyuraji in Asuka, Nara, some 50 km (31 mi) away. Four noborigama-style climbing kilns remain, spaced approximately eight meters apart, and the excavated artifacts include roof tiles, Sue ware and Haji ware pottery, inkstones, and other earthenware products. It is believed that operations began and ended around the middle of the 7th century.

The remains have been backfilled for protection, but the area has been developed as a park. The site is about a 20-minute walk from Mimurodo Station on the Keihan Electric Railway Uji Line.

== See also ==
- List of Historic Sites of Japan (Kyoto)
