= Mimuroto-ji =

Buddhist temple in Uji, Kyoto, Japan

- 三室戸寺
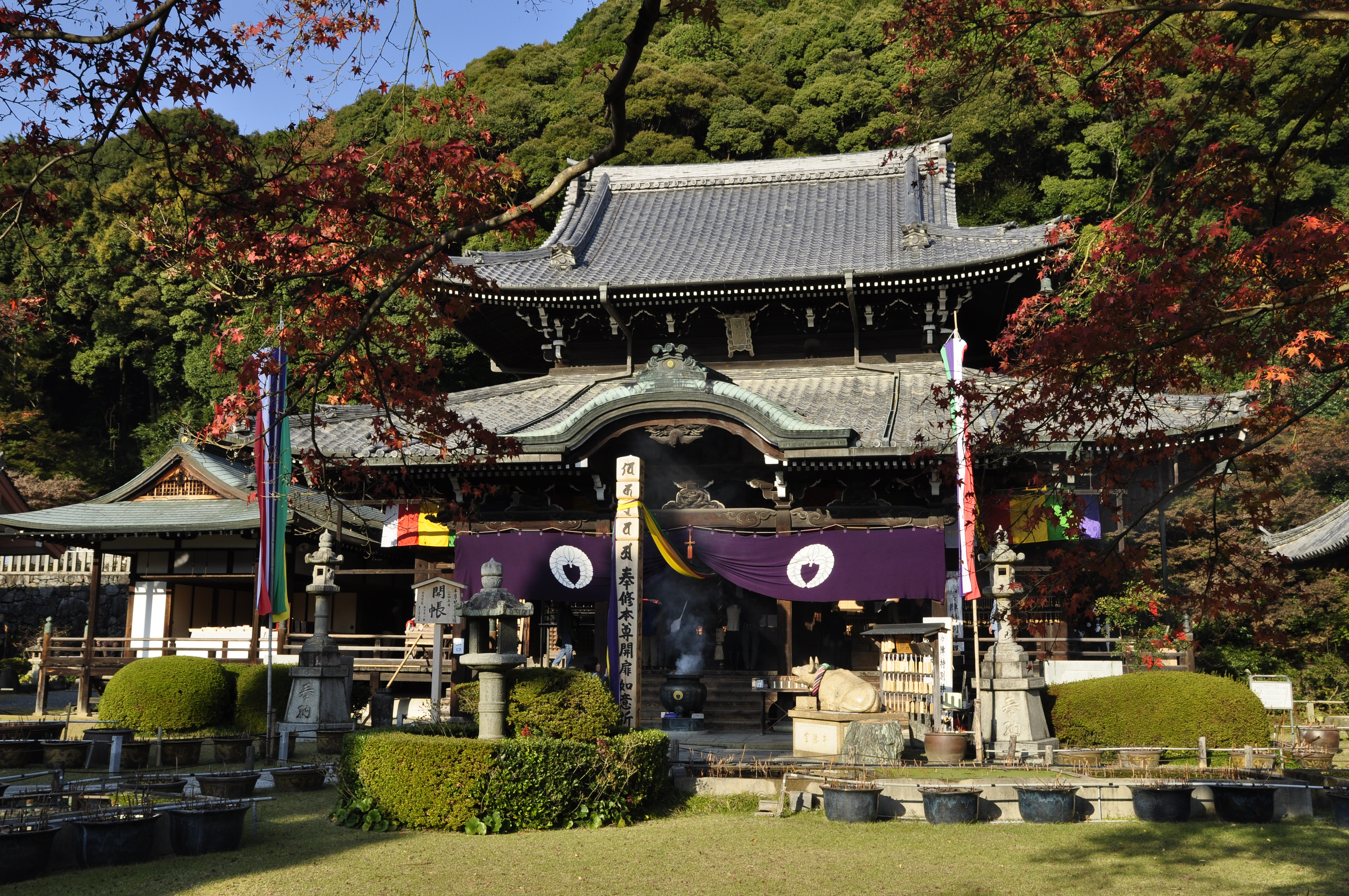
- Mimuroto-ji Hondō

- Location within Kyoto Prefecture Location within Japan

Religion
- Affiliation: Buddhist
- Deity: Senjū Kannon
- Rite: Shugendō
- Status: functional

Location
- Location: 21 Shigadani, Uji-shi, Kyoto-fu
- Interactive map of Mimuroto-ji
- Coordinates: 34°54′1.72″N 135°49′9.10″E

Architecture
- Founder: Gyōhyō, Emperor Kōnin
- Completed: c.770

Website
- Official website
- National Important Cultural Property

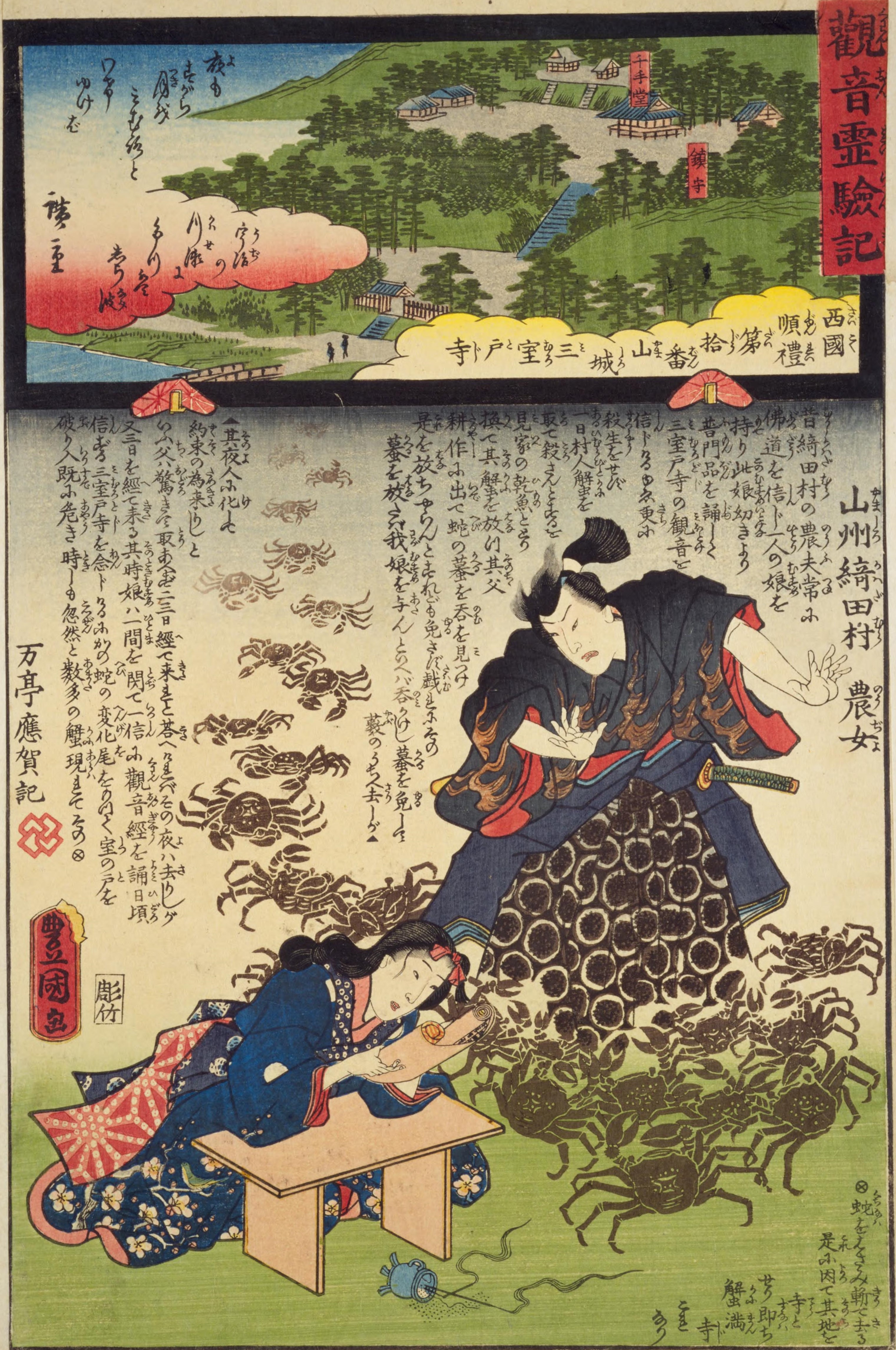
from the picture album "Kannon Reigen ki"

Mimuroto-ji (三室戸寺) is a Buddhist temple located in the Shigadani neighborhood of the city of Uji, Kyoto, Kyoto Prefecture, Japan. It belongs to the Honzanshugen-shu, a branch of Shugendō loosely affiliated with the Tendai of Japanese Buddhism and its honzon is a hibutsu statue of Senjū Kannon Bosatsu. (Sahasrabhuja) The temple's full name is Akaboshi-san Mimuroto-ji (明星山 三室戸寺). The temple is the 10th stop on the Saigoku Kannon Pilgrimage route. When the temple was built in ancient times, it was meant to shield Kyoto from evil spirits. Its gardens have 20,000 azaleas and 1000 rhododendrons.

== Overview ==
The origin of this temple is uncertain. According to temple legend, the temple was founded in 770 by Gyōhyō, a monk from Daian-ji in Heijō-kyō, at the request of Emperor Kōnin. Per this legend, Emperor Tenchi's grandson, Shirakabe no Omi (later Emperor Kōnin), wished to know the true nature of the golden spiritual light that reached the Imperial Palace every night. He ordered Fujiwara no Inukai, his right-hand man (also known as a historian), to search for the source of the light. Inukai's search led him upstream along the Shizu River, a tributary of the Uji River, where he saw a Senjū Kannon statue about two feet tall in the basin of a waterfall. When Inukai jumped into the waterfall, a lotus petal floated down and transformed into a two-armed Kannon statue measuring one foot and two inches in height. Emperor Kōnin enshrined the Kannon statue, and Gyōhyō established the temple, which was originally called Ōmuroto-ji (御室戸寺). Later, Emperor Kanmu erected a two-foot-tall Kannon statue and placed the previously mentioned one, measuring one foot and two inches, inside its womb.

There is no historical documentary evidence to support any of this legend. The monk Gyōson's "Pilgrimage to the Thirty-Three Temples of the Western Provinces," included in the "Jimon Kōsō-ki," a collection of biographies of monks from Onjō-ji (Mii-dera), is the oldest historical document on the pilgrimage to the Thirty-Three Temples of the Western Provinces. According to this record, when Gyōson made his pilgrimage around the end of the 11th century, Ōmuroto-ji was the thirty-third, or final, pilgrimage site. During the Kanpei era (889-898), Enchin of Onjō-ji stayed here, and later, cloistered Emperor Kazan established a villa here and designated the temple as the tenth temple on the revived Saigoku Pilgrimage.

During the Chōwa era (1012-1017), Emperor Sanjō built the Hokke Sammi-dō, and Emperor Shirakawa built the Jyōgyō Sammi-dō, and donated a shōen manor for the temple's upkeep. Also, when Emperor Shirakawa made a pilgrimage to Kumano, a 17-day gōma offering ritual was performed at the temple. During the Kōwa era (1099-1103), Daisōjō Ryūmei, the abbot of Onjō-ji, restored the temple and relocated the sub-temple, Raku-in, which had been built at Onjō-ji at Emperor Shirakawa's request, to Ōmuroto-ji. Later, Emperor Horikawa, a devout follower of Ryūmei, expanded the temple's buildings and granted him the official title of governor of Nakakuki District, Musashi Province. Around this time, the temple became a villa for the three emperors, Emperor Kōnin, Emperor Kazan, and Emperor Shirakawa, and the temple came to be called Mimuroto-ji.

With this extensive patronage from the imperial family, the temple initially prospered, but by the Muromachi period, the temple started to fall into decline. A fire on December 13, 1462 spread from the dining hall destroyed most of the main temple complex. It was rebuilt at the command of Emperor Go-Tsuchimikado in 1487. In 1573, the temple sided with Shogun Ashikaga Yoshiaki, who had fled to nearby Makishima Castle, against Oda Nobunaga, and as a result, all of its lands were confiscated, causing the temple to fall into decline. However, it was restored in 1639 by Prince Doko, the cloistered son of Emperor Go-Yōzei and head of the monzeki temple of Shōgo-in. Around the Meiwa era (1764-1772), the main hall again fell into disrepair, and it was not rebuilt until 1814.

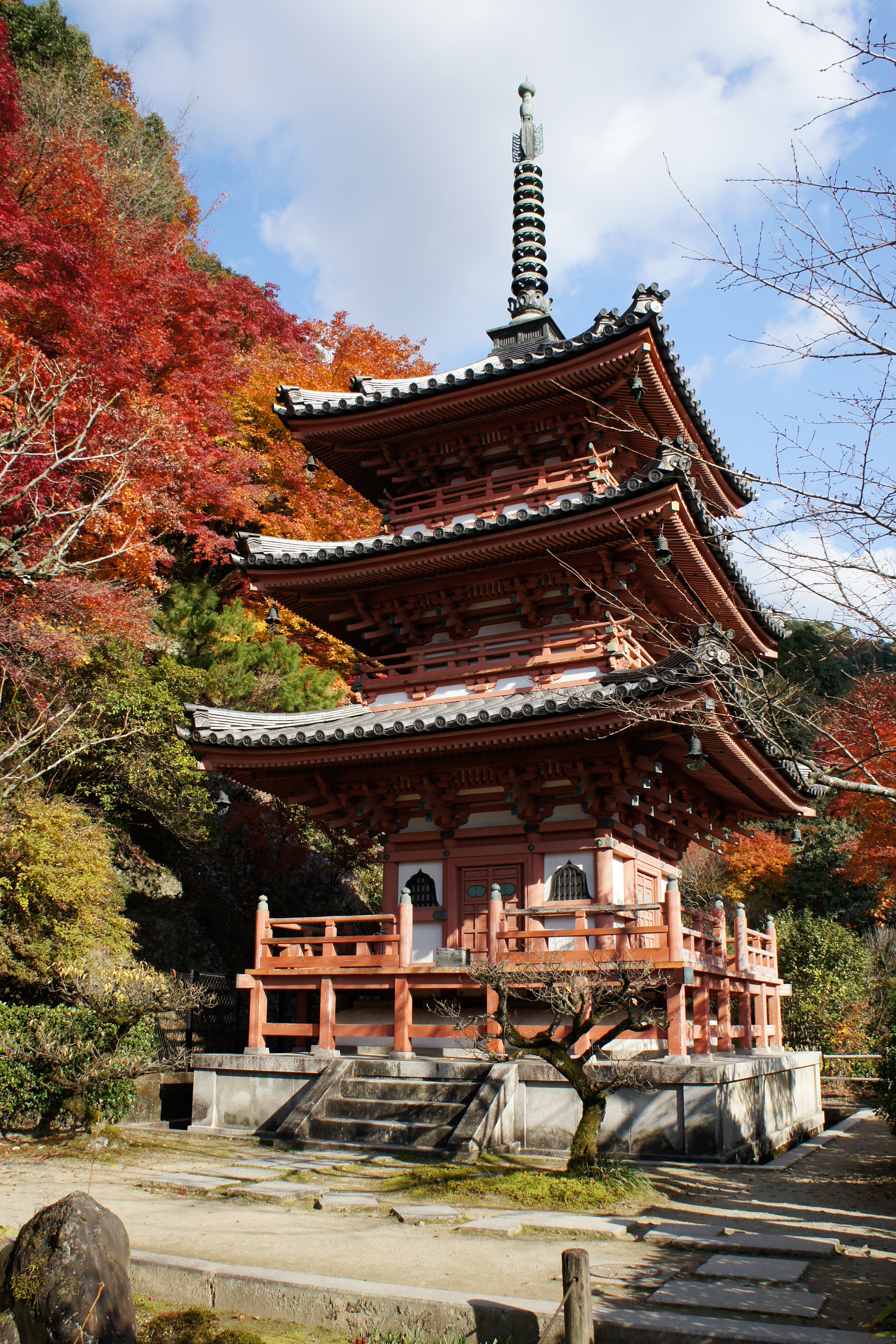
Pagoda

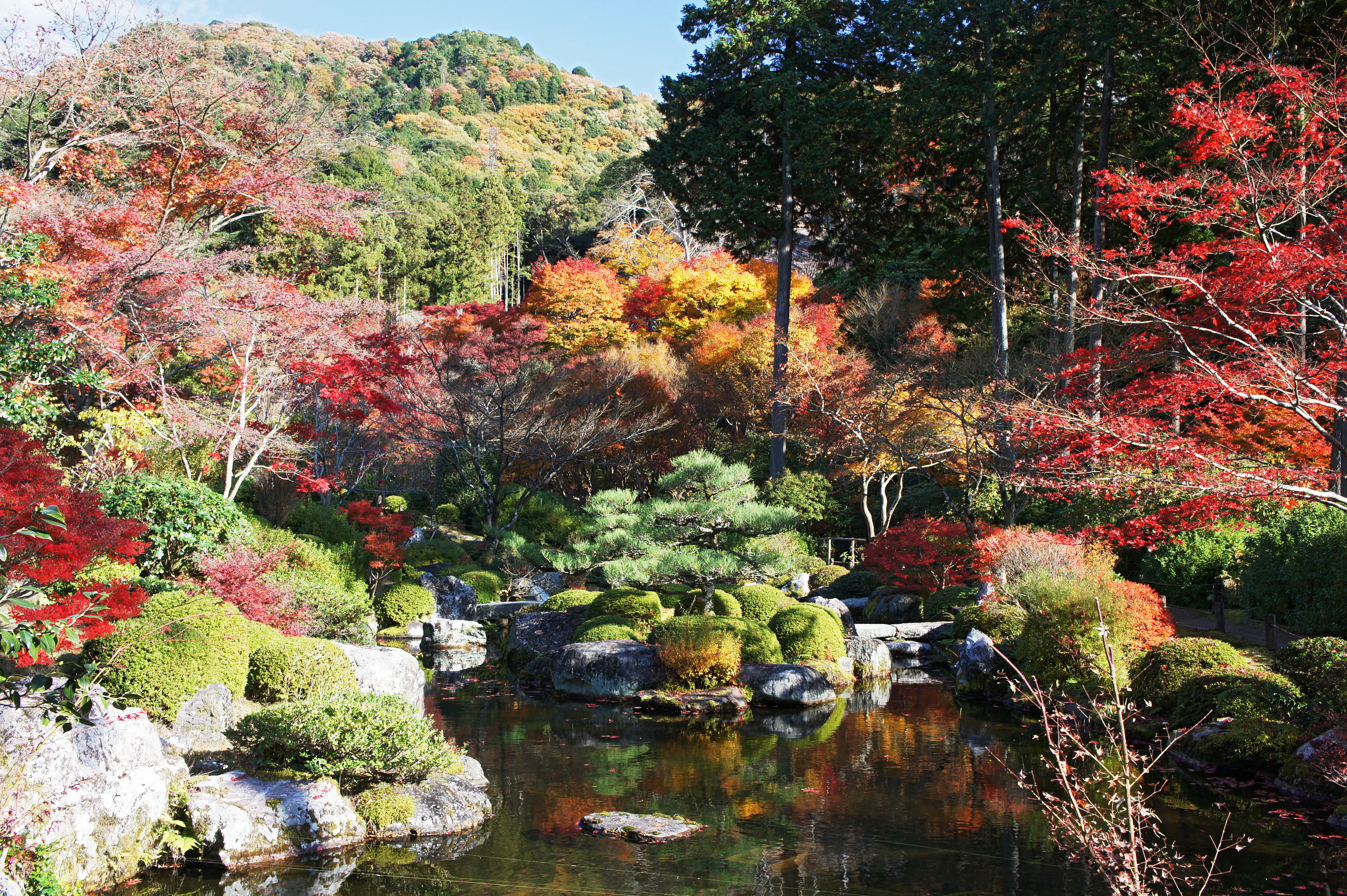
Gardens

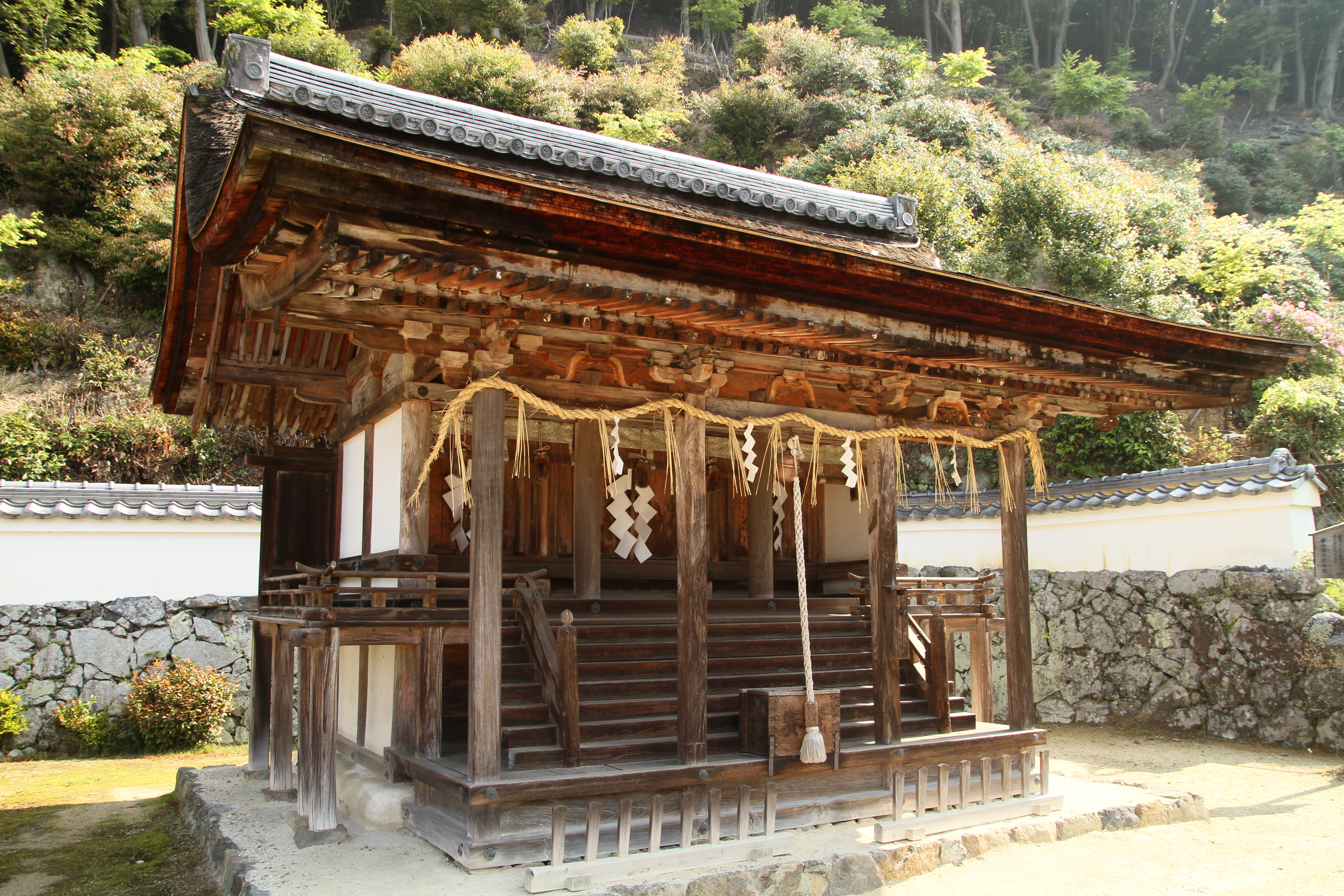
Juhachi Jinja Honden

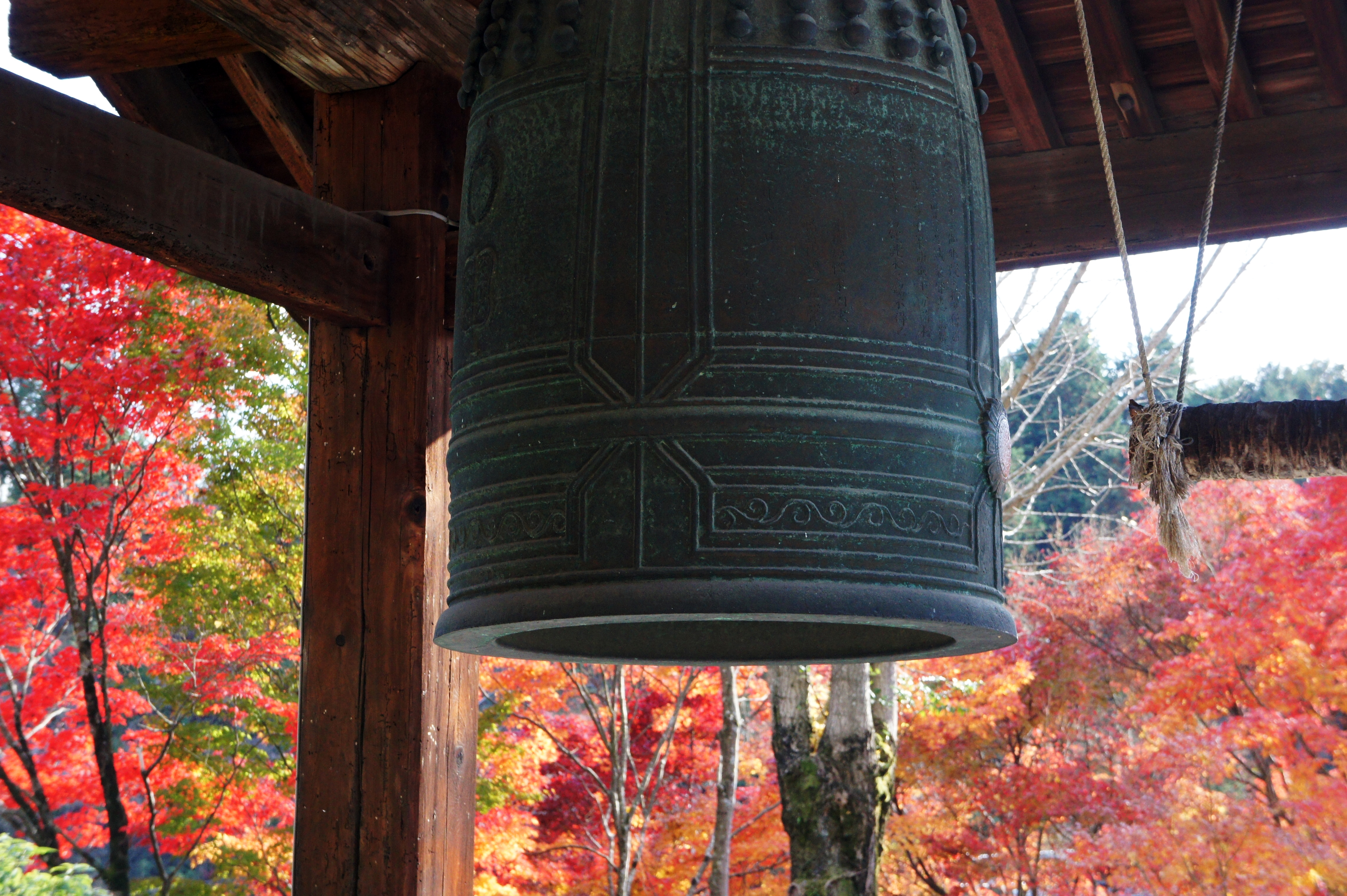
Shōrō

The temple is approximately a 15-minute walk from Mimurodo Station on the Keihan Railway.

== Cultural Properties ==
=== National Important Cultural Properties ===
- Jūhachi Jinja Honden (十八神社本殿), Muromachi period (1487);
- Wooden statues of seated Amida Nyorai and attendants (木造阿弥陀如来坐像及び両脇侍坐像), early Heian period, by Jōchō;
- Wooden statue of standing Shaka Nyorai (木造釈迦如来立像), Kamakura period;
- Wooden statue of standing Bishmon-ten (木造毘沙門天立像), late Heian period;

=== Kyoto Prefecture Designated Tangible Cultural Properties ===
- Hondō (本堂), Edo period;
- Three-story Pagoda (三重塔), Edo period
- Amida-dō (阿弥陀堂), Edo period;
- Shōrō (鐘楼), Edo period;
- Wooden Struts from former Hondō (旧本堂蟇股), Muromachi period;
- Colored silk painting of Gandharva (絹本著色乾闥婆像)
- Colored silk Mandala of Mount Asakuma (絹本著色朝熊山曼荼羅図)
- Colored silk painting of Nyōrin Kannon (絹本著色如意輪観音像)
- Colored silk painting of Daiitoku Myōō (絹本著色大威徳明王像);
- Colored silk Vajra Realm Mandala (絹本著色両界曼荼羅図 金剛界) (2)
- Colored silk Womb Realm Mandala (絹本著色両界曼荼羅図 胎蔵界) (2)
- Colored silk Mandala of a Treasure Tower and Pavilion (絹本著色宝楼閣曼荼羅図)
- Colored silk painting of Myōken (絹本著色尊星王像);
- Colored silk painting of Twelve Devas: Taishakuen (絹本著色十二天像 帝釈天)
- Colored silk painting of Twelve Devas: Katen (絹本著色十二天像 火天)
- Colored silk painting of Twelve Devas: Emma-ten (絹本著色十二天像 焔魔天)
- Colored silk painting of Twelve Devas: Rasetsuten (絹本著色十二天像 羅刹天);
- Colored silk painting of Twelve Devas: Suiten (絹本著色十二天像 水天)
- Colored silk painting of Twelve Devas: Futen (絹本著色十二天像 風天)
- Colored silk painting of Twelve Devas: Bishamon-ten (絹本著色十二天像 毘沙門天)
- Colored silk painting of Twelve Devas: Ishanaten (絹本著色十二天像 伊舎那天);
- Colored silk painting of Twelve Devas: Bonten (絹本著色十二天像 梵天)
- Colored silk painting of Twelve Devas: Jiten (絹本著色十二天像 地天)
- Colored silk painting of Twelve Devas: Nitten (絹本著色十二天像 日天)
- Colored silk painting of Twelve Devas: Gatten (絹本著色十二天像 月天);

=== Uji City Designated Tangible Cultural Properties ===
- Colored silk painting of Nyōirin Kannon (絹本着色如意輪観音像); Kamakura period
