= Goro Furuta =

Japanese painter and sculptor

- Born: 1971 (age 54–55); Japan Tokyo
- Education: Japan College of Zoology and Plant Science
- Occupations: Painter, sculptor
- Organization: Kaiyodo

Goro Furuta (born 1971) is a painter and sculptor of Kaiyodo.

== Early life ==
Furuta was born in Tokyo. He joined Kaiyodo Co., Ltd. in 1994.

== Career ==
Furuta worked as a clerk at Kaiyodo's store, Hoppy Lobby Tokyo. In Shibuya he met Kaiyodo's sculptors, including Shinobu Matsumura and Takashi Kinoshita. He is in charge of almost all painting masters (painting samples) of biological figures, including the "Japan Animal Collection Series". He has knowledge of reptiles and paleontology, and is in charge of serializing personal works for reptile magazines and producing models for museum displays. Since 2021, he has been a joint researcher at the International Research Center for Japanese Studies.

== Notable works ==
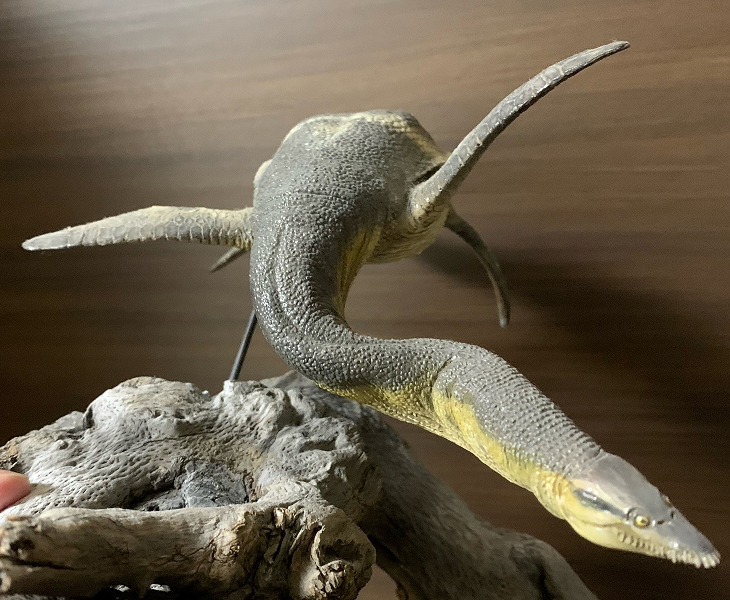
Satsuma-utsunomiya-ryu

- Chocolate Egg Japanese Animal Collection Series
- Platybelodon three-dimensional figure for わけあって絶滅しました。) (Note: Originated from the book which title translated as "extinct for a reason". This book explains the reasons of extinction of various taxa. On the other hand, there are theories that are not widely accepted or made-up reasons that are not discussed in papers.)
- Ito Jakuchu's chicken

== Special exhibitions ==
- "Ehime Prefectural Museum of Art 25th Anniversary Kaiyodo Exhibition: Creating Fun for All" (2023 Ehime Prefectural Museum of Art)
- "Kaiyodo Figure × Delusion Aquarium" (2022 Shikoku Aquarium)

== Serialization ==
- ビバリウムガイド
