= Suzuki Kiitsu =

Japanese painter

Suzuki Kiitsu 鈴木其一
- Born: 1796; Edo, Japan
- Died: 1858; Japan
- Known for: Painting
- Notable work: Mountain Stream in Summer and Autumn; Morning Glories; Wind God and Thunder God
- Movement: Rinpa school

Suzuki Kiitsu (Japanese: 鈴木其一; 1796–1858) was a Japanese painter of the Rinpa school.

A student of the famous painter Sakai Hoitsu (1761–1828), he was for a long time considered a minor member of Rinpa school of Japanese painting. In recent years his work has been reevaluated and gained recognition, leading to a series of major exhibitions of his art in 2016–2017 in Tokyo, Hyogo and Kyoto.

Kiitsu is best known for his byōbu folding screens, often a reinterpretation of screens by other Rinpa artists, such as his massive Wind God and Thunder God following Tawaraya Sōtatsu (c. 1570 – c. 1640), Ogata Kōrin (1658–1716) and Hoitsu. But he has been most acclaimed for his original screens, including his famed Morning Glories and Mountain Stream in Summer and Autumn.

He was also a notable master with many pupils. Although he was not the official successor of Hoitsu's school, he trained himself many of the Edo Rinpa artists. This has sometimes been labeled as the Kiitsu school of Edo Rinpa.

== Works ==
Mountain Stream in Summer and Autumn is a pair of six-panel byōbu folding screens made by Kiitsu using ink and color on gold-foiled paper. It depicts "a scene of mountain streams flowing through cypress groves highlighted by lilies and a cherry tree with a few red autumn leaves" but the effect of the screens has been described as "somehow strangely unreal" and "[having] a feeling of almost hyperrealism". It has been designated as an Important Cultural Property.

Another features noted in relation with Kōrin's Irises screens include "the rhythmical feel of the motifs and the brilliance of the blues and greens against the gold ground". The work shows influence of Tawaraya Sōtatsu, Ogata Kōrin and Sakai Hōitsu and has been described as "one of the great masterpieces of Rinpa painting".

Mountain Stream in Summer and Autumn

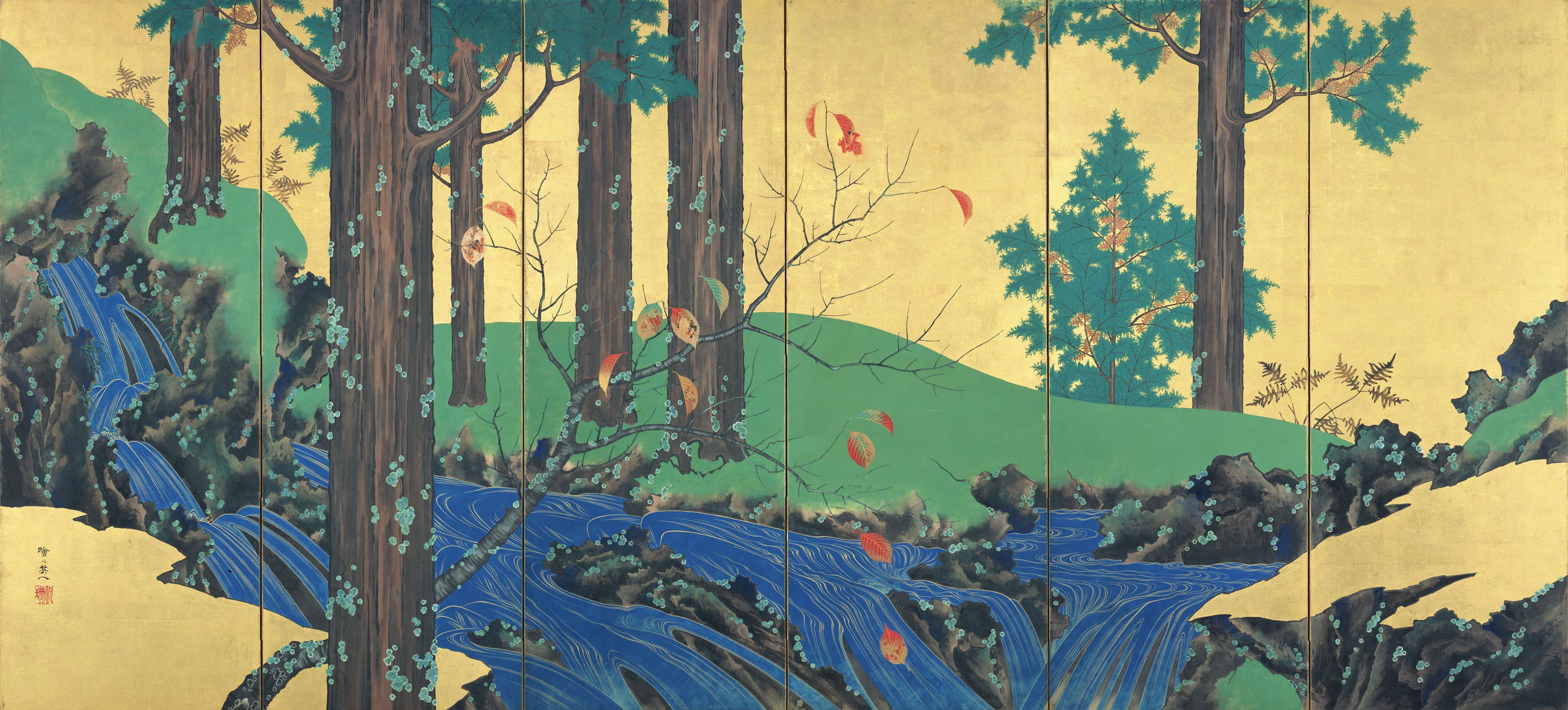

Each screen measures 165.8 by 363.2 centimeters (65.3 in × 143.0 in). They belong to the Nezu Museum in Tokyo, where they are exhibited occasionally (last time, from April 12 to May 14, 2017).

Around 1832 to 1836, Kiitsu created a notable copy of Tawaraya Sōtatsu's painting, Waves at Matsushima.

Wind God and Thunder God (紙本金地著色風神雷神図) is a pair of four sliding doors made using color on silk. It depicts Raijin, the god of lightning, thunder and storms in the Shinto religion and in Japanese mythology, and Fūjin, the god of wind. The work follows a Rinpa tradition of copying and reworking Sōtatsu's original Wind God and Thunder God screen. In addition to Kiitsu, both Kōrin and Hōitsu made notable versions of the work (see Kōrin's version). All previous interpretations of the work use the format of two two-folded screens, making Kiitsu's use of eight sliding doors stand out.

Wind God and Thunder God

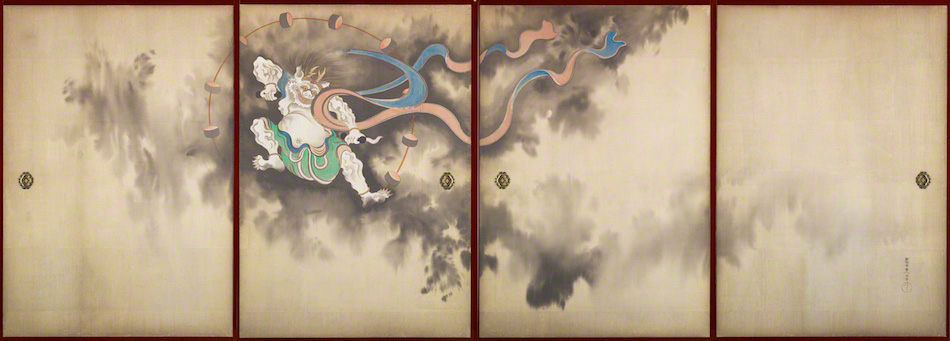

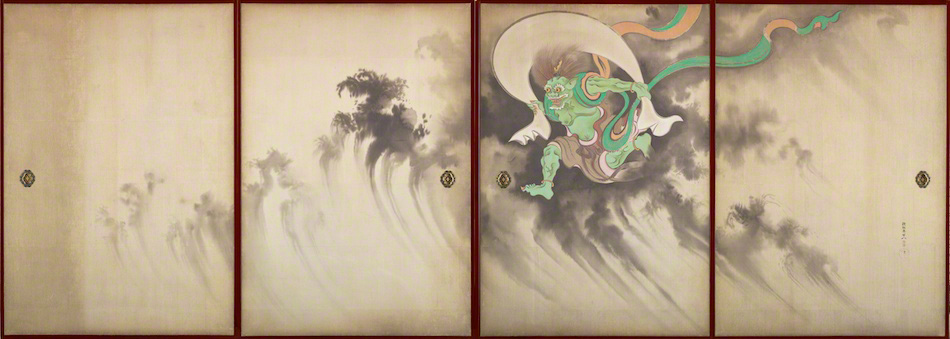

The doors measure 168.0 by 115.5 centimeters (66.1 in × 45.5 in) each, and belong to the Tokyo Fuji Art Museum. It was last exhibited from January 3 to February 19, 2017, at the Hosomi Museum in Kyoto.

"Moon with Bush Clovers"
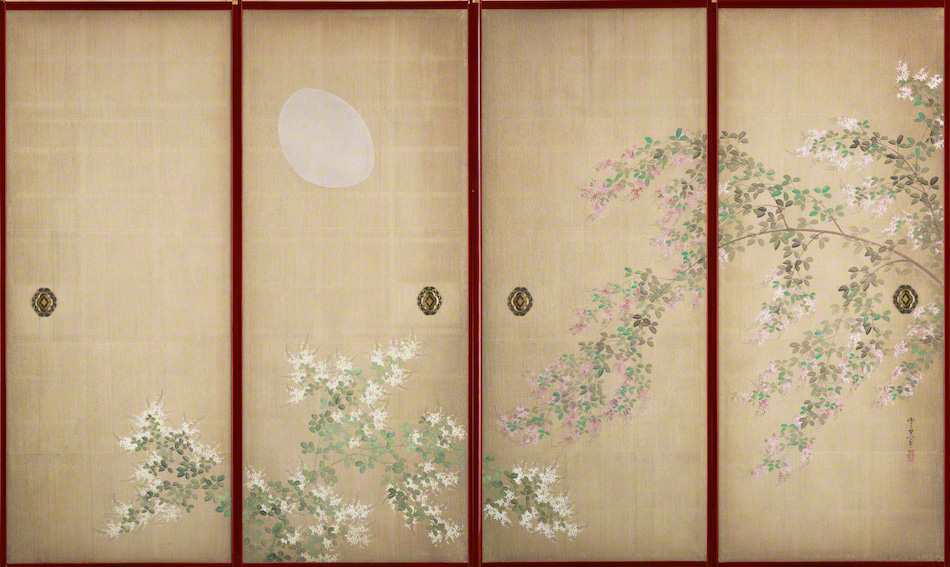

Moon with Bush Clovers (萩月図襖) is a pair of two sliding doors made using color on silk. The work represents a scene of nature with bush clovers and an abstracted moon. Similar in style and color to the Wind God and Thunder God doors, it also belongs to the Rinpa tradition of folding screens with images of nature. In particular, it resembles Hōitsu's Autumn Flowers and Moon screens.

The doors measure 168.8 by 68.5 centimeters (66.4 in × 27.0 in) each, and belong to the Tokyo Fuji Art Museum. It was last exhibited from July 28 to August 26, 2017, at the 21st Century Museum of Contemporary Art in Kanazawa.

It is also notable his contribution to Sakai Hoitsu's influential compendium of Rinpa art One Hundred Paintings by Korin (Korin hyakuzu).

Morning Glories (朝顔図屏風)

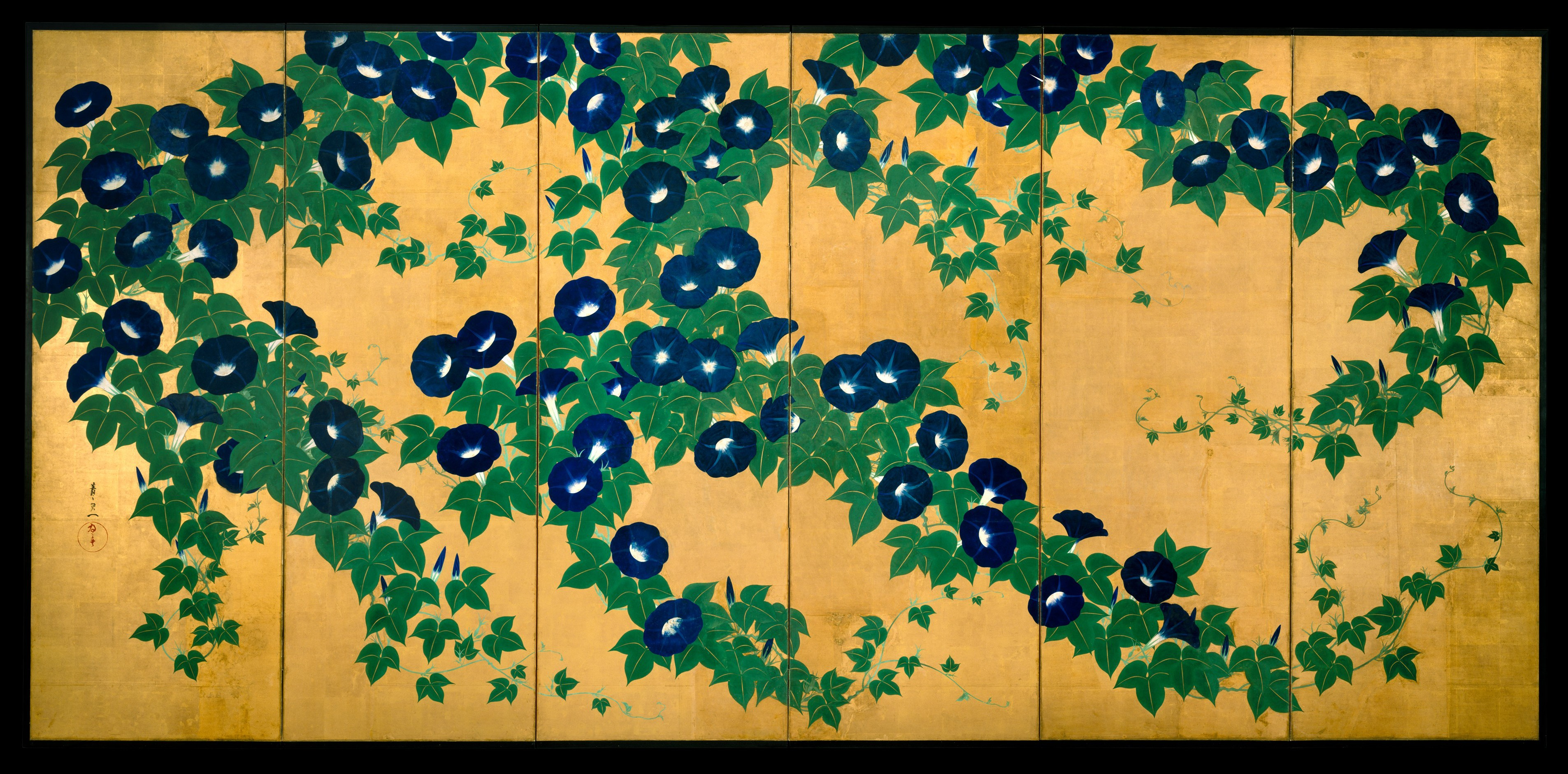

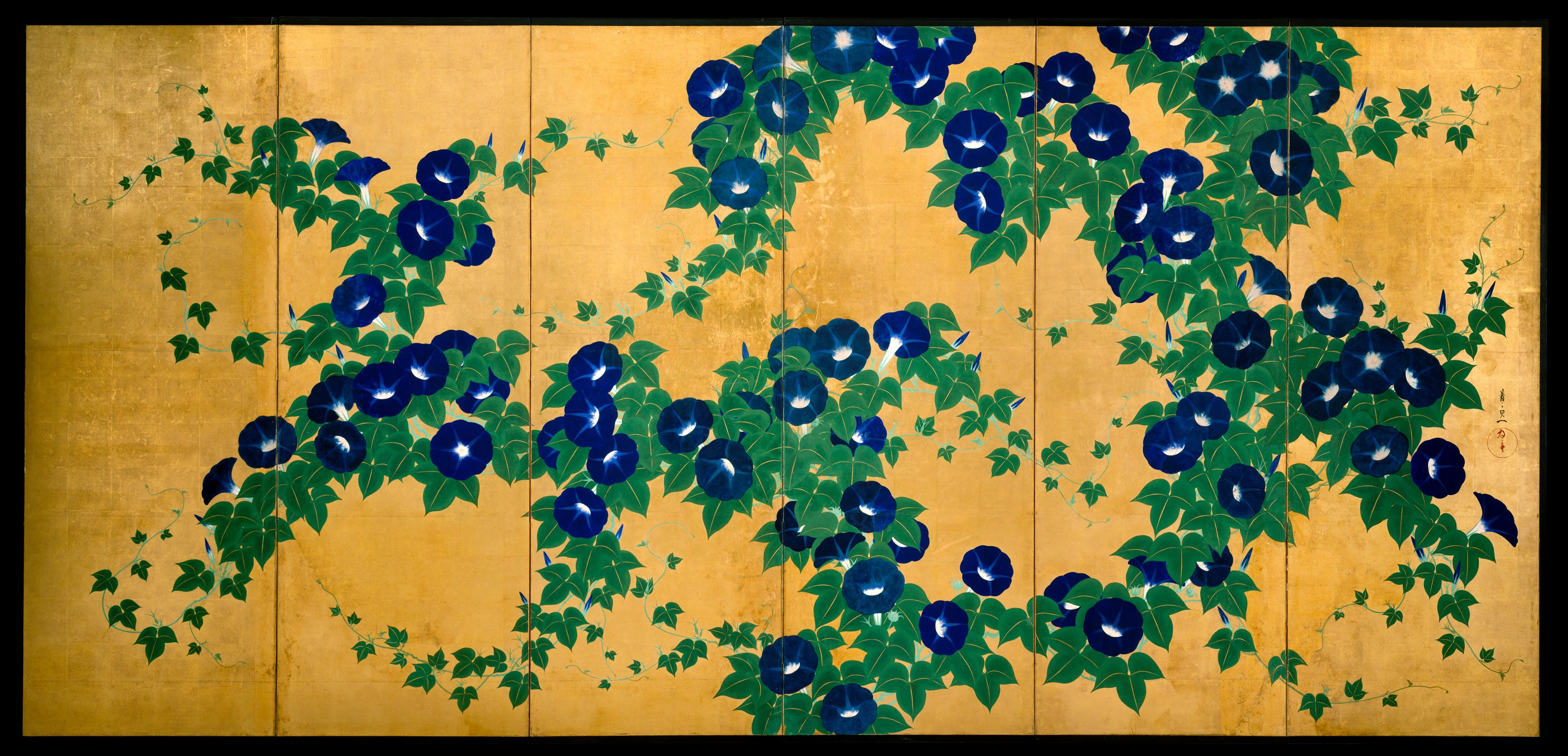

== Exhibitions ==
- Suzuki Kiitsu: Standard-bearer of the Edo Rimpa School (2016, September 10 – October 30) Suntory Museum of Art, Tokyo
- Suzuki Kiitsu: Standard-bearer of the Edo Rimpa School (2016, November 12 – December 25) Himeji City Museum of Art, Himeji
- Suzuki Kiitsu: Standard-bearer of the Edo Rimpa School (2017, January 3 – February 19) Hosomi Museum, Kyoto
