= Waves at Matsushima =

Early modern Japanese paintings

- Pine Islands
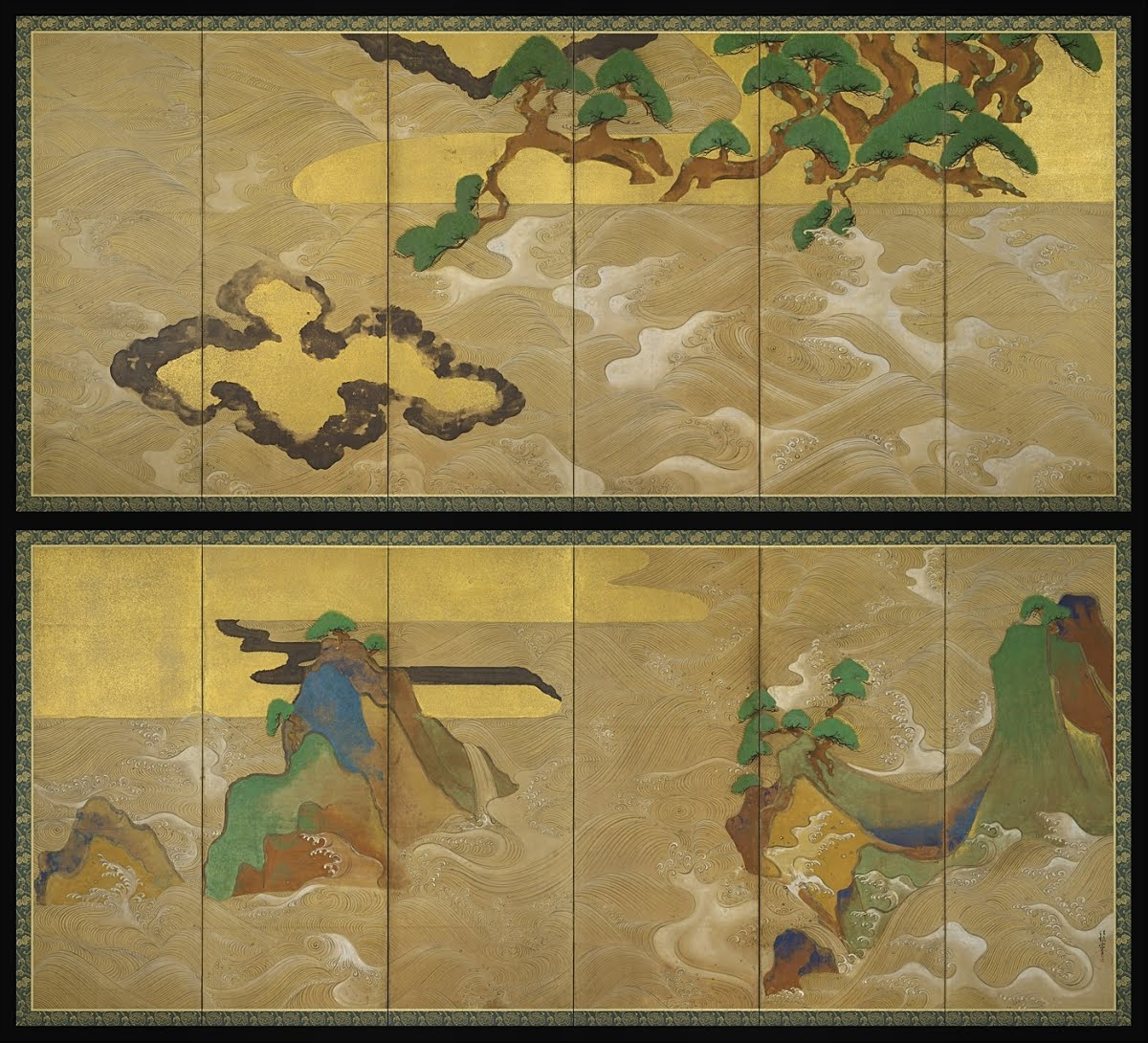
- Artist: Tawaraya Sōtatsu
- Year: 1620s
- Medium: Ink, color, gold, and silver on paper
- Movement: Rinpa school
- Subject: Landscape painting of a sea surrounding rocks growing with pine trees
- Dimensions: 166 cm × 369.9 cm (65 in × 145.6 in); each screen
- Location: Freer Gallery of Art, Washington, D.C.
- Accession: F1906.231-232

Waves at Matsushima, also named Pine Islands, is a pair of Japanese landscape paintings on two six-fold screens, made by artist Tawaraya Sōtatsu in the 1620s. They were painted with ink, color, gold, and silver on paper. They are symbolic of Sōtatsu's aspirations for the afterlife, and were likely commissioned to celebrate the opening of the Shōunji zen temple in Sakai. They have been associated with the coastline of Matsushima, though they were named in the early 20th century, and likely represent no specific location.

The pair is the only surviving work of the six pairs done by Sōtatsu. They are considered Sōtatsu's masterwork, and an icon of Kyoto's Rinpa school of art. They inspired paintings by Ogata Kōrin and Suzuki Kiitsu of the same name. Kōrin's work, painted in the early 17th century, brought attention to Sōtatsu's version.

== Background ==
Tawaraya Sōtatsu was a Japanese artist who worked in "relative anonymity" as a part of the "craftsmen" class of artists during the early 17th century. He was a central figure of the Rinpa school of art in Kyoto. The Rinpa school of art grew in the early 17th century with the establishment of the bakufu (military government) in Edo, later named Tokyo. During that time, large-format paintings on folding screens and sliding doors were common, and located in castles, palaces, or temples. They usually had floral and faunal subjects. The chief patrons of Rinpa artists were traditional courtiers, wealthy merchants, and elite warriors. From about 1600 to 1640, Sōtatsu decorated elements of important documents and paper fans. He worked at the Tawaraya, his studio and shop in Kyoto. His most famous technique was tarashikomi, or "a pooling of pigment or ink in partially dried layers, which encouraged random, semi-translucent shapes to form". His works were rendered with planes of shadow, in different tones of grey and black.

== Composition ==
Waves at Matsushima, also known as Pine Islands, is a pair of paintings on two six-fold screens, in the medium of ink, color, gold, and silver on paper. Each are 12 feet in width. The paintings have been associated with the coastline of Matsushima, though the paintings were named after their creation, and likely represent no specific location.

The pair was painted in the 1620s, specifically in the Kan'ei era (1624–1644). The screens are one of six surviving works painted on the six-panel format used by Sōtatsu. Paintings of this type were usually used as a backdrop on special occasions, such as a celebration of the changing seasons, or the visit of a dignitary. Matsushima was likely commissioned in the late 1620s by wealthy sea captain and merchant Tani Shōan, to celebrate the opening of the Shōunji zen temple at the port of Sakai. The pair was recorded as being at the temple. Shōan was retiring with the temple's opening. This type of painting was usually made members of a "painterly" class, higher than Sōtatsu's craftsmen class. However, an exception was made for Sōtatsu in a time of "unusual social fluidity", through his talent alone.

In the scenes, a sea with waves surrounds rocks growing with pine trees. The rocks are colored green, blue, brown, and are highlighted with gold. The waves consist of alternating lines of white and gold. The clouds and embankments are made of gold leaf particles, accented with a silver pigment which has turned to a soft black over time. The paintings contain intentional remnants of their creation, such as "dark outlines, intentional layered bleeding of pigments, and the clear remainders of pigment granules". Sōtatsu's signature includes the phrase Hokkyo (Bridge of the Law), a Buddhist ecclesiastical title. Sōtatsu uses a large amount of gold leaves for color, which Rinpa scholar Yamane Yūzō argues is for a sense of "well-being and abundance". The work uses tarashikomi.

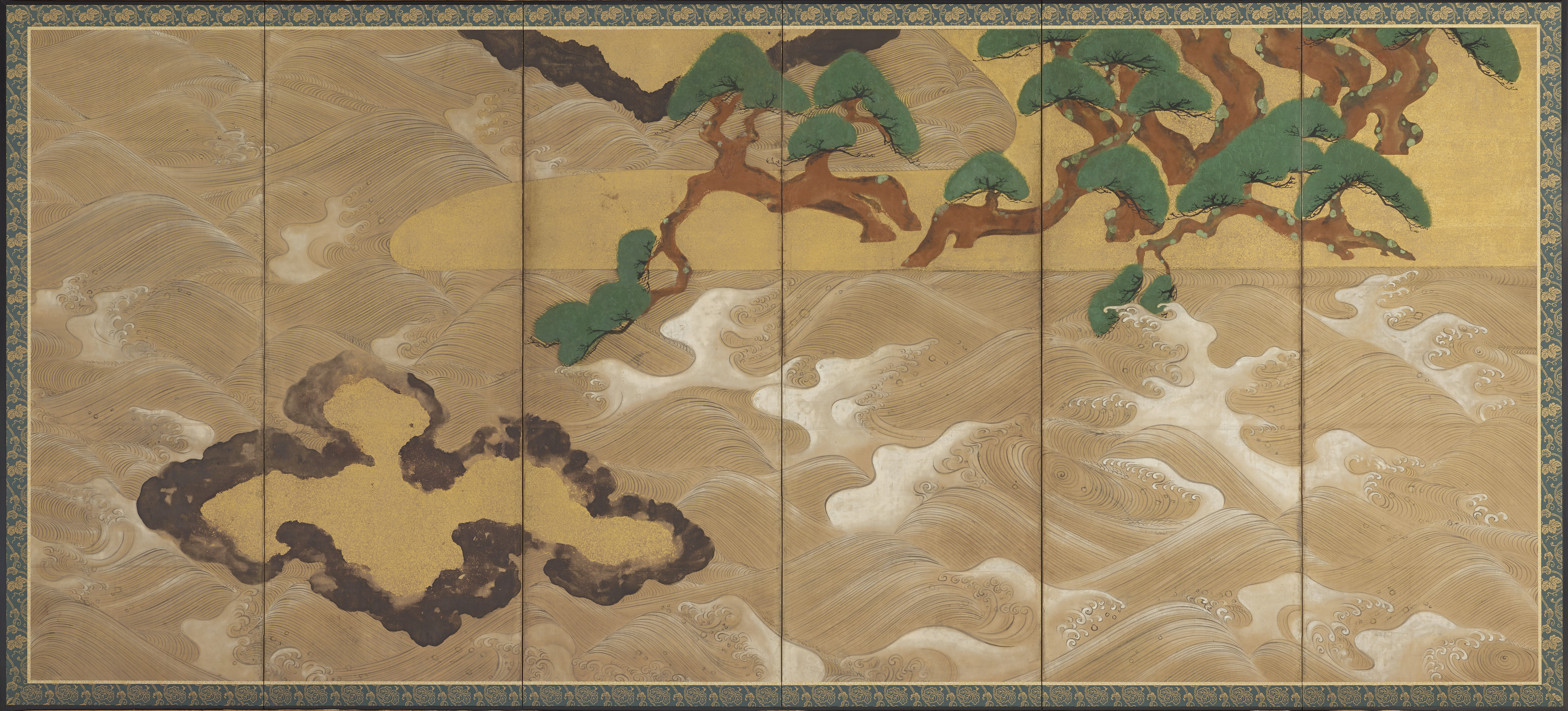
Left screen

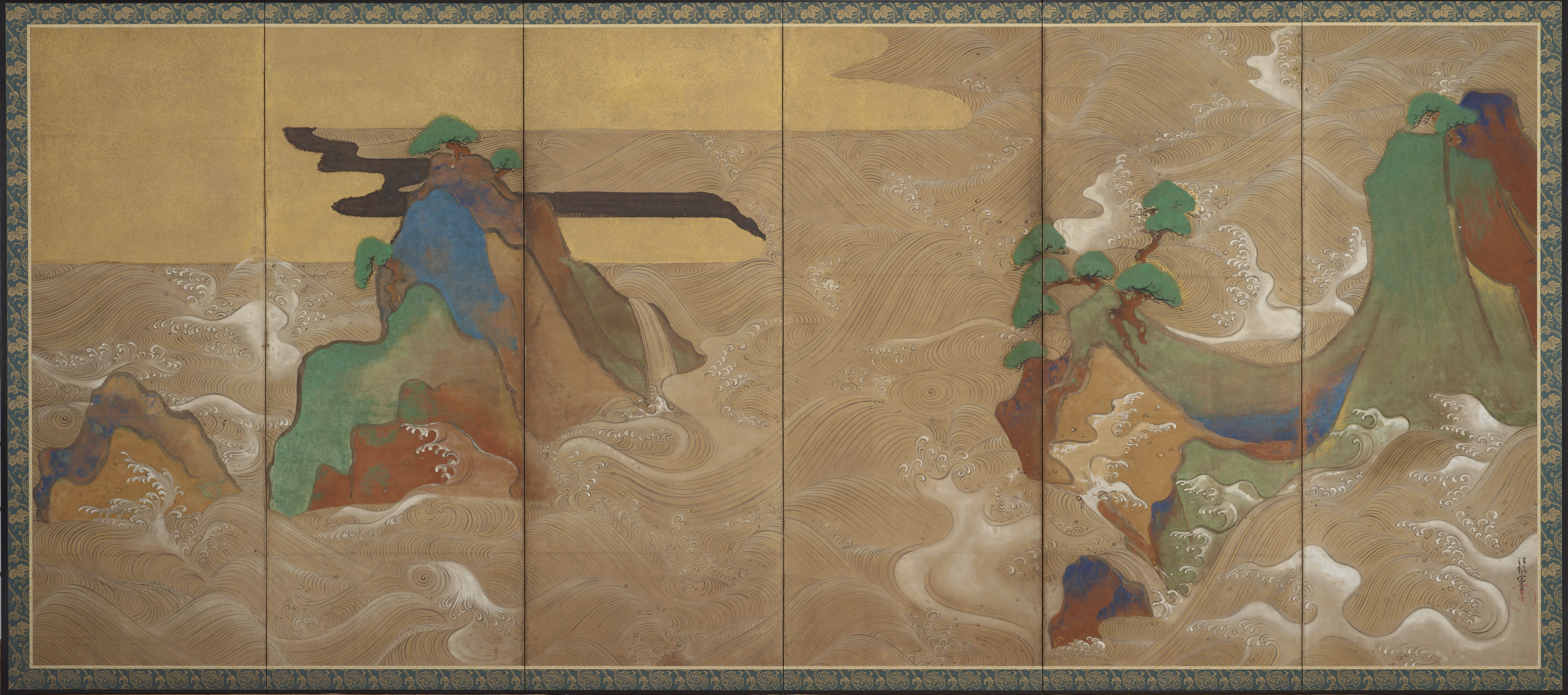
Right screen

== Legacy ==
The pair is seen as Sōtatsu's masterwork. His work had gone mostly unnoticed after his death in the 1640s, but his work still impacted "generations of famous artists". The pair inspired works by Ogata Kōrin and Suzuki Kiitsu, which were also named Waves at Matsushima. Kōrin's work was heavily inspired by Sōtatsu, and he painted a six-fold screen in the early 18th century which was based on Sōtatsu's Matsushima. Compared to Sōtatsu's painting, Kōrin's has more "assertive" waves and sharper color contrasts. After Kōrin's work, Sōtatsu's original became an icon of the Rinpa canon. Kōrin's work was lost, but a copy on woodblock print was made by Sakai Hōitsu in 1826, in his second collection of works titled One Hundred Paintings by Kōrin. Suzuki Kiitsu studied the Rinpa masters, and circa 1832 to 1836, he made two sliding doors that resemble the other two's screens.

In the late 1800s, a group of Western collectors, including Charles Lang Freer, started collecting Sōtatsu's work. The name Waves at Matsushima was given to the screens in the early 20th century. Freer bought the work, which was labeled as Rolling Waves and Rocks, in 1906 for $5,000. He initially displayed it in his Detroit home. It was further popularized after featuring in an exhibit at an unnamed gallery in 1913, which influenced Henri Matisse and Gustav Klimt, and at the Tokyo Museum in 1947, when Sōtatsu's work was exhibited alongside Mattise's. At the latter show, viewers were surprised to see Mattise and Sōtatsu's similarities. Currently, they are located in the Smithsonian's Freer Gallery of Art in Washington, D.C., where they have been since 1919, and they are seen as one of the gallery's masterpieces. They were in an exhibit at the Smithsonian's Sackler Gallery in 2011, and in “Sōtatsu: Making Waves”, at the Freer Gallery from 2015 to 2016.

Artworks inspired by and named after Sōtatsu's Waves at Matsushima

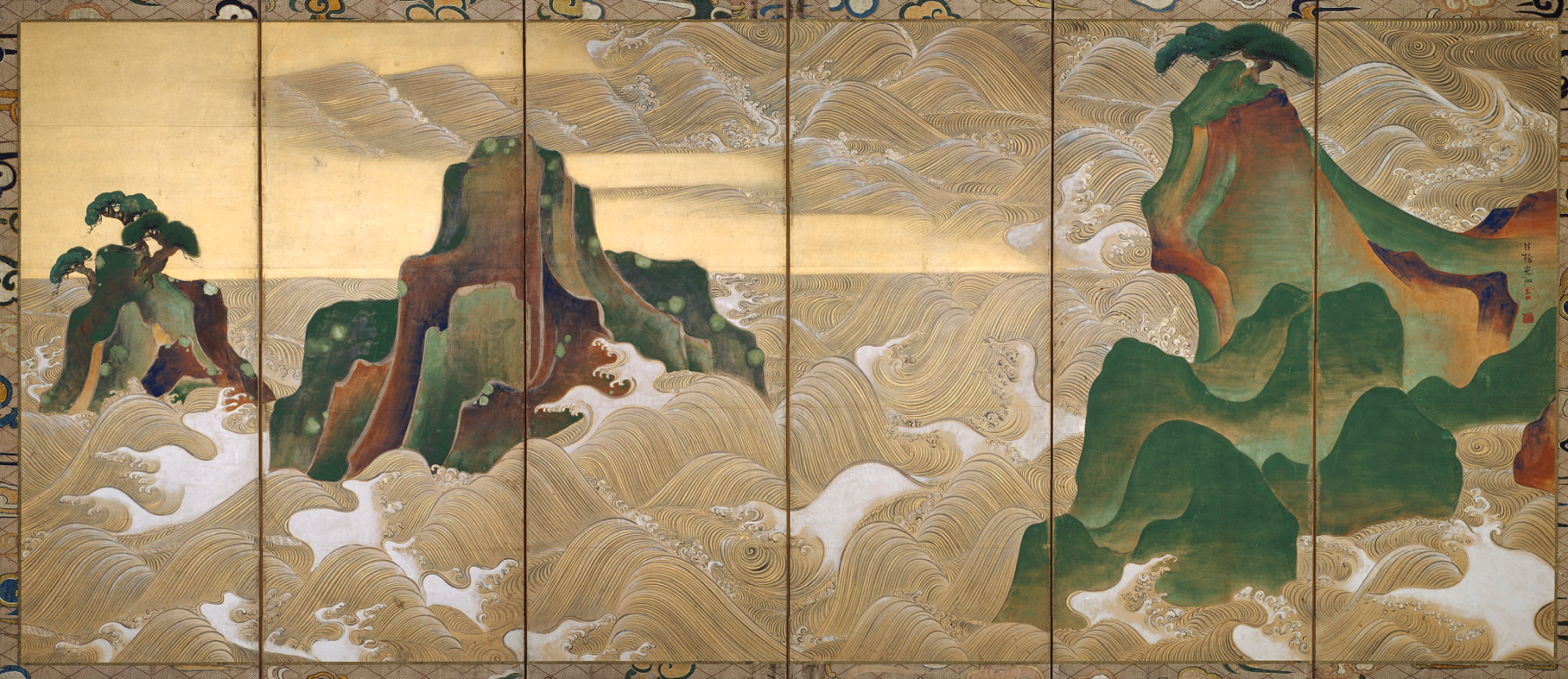
Ogata Kōrin Waves at Matsushima, early Edo period, Museum of Fine Arts, Boston

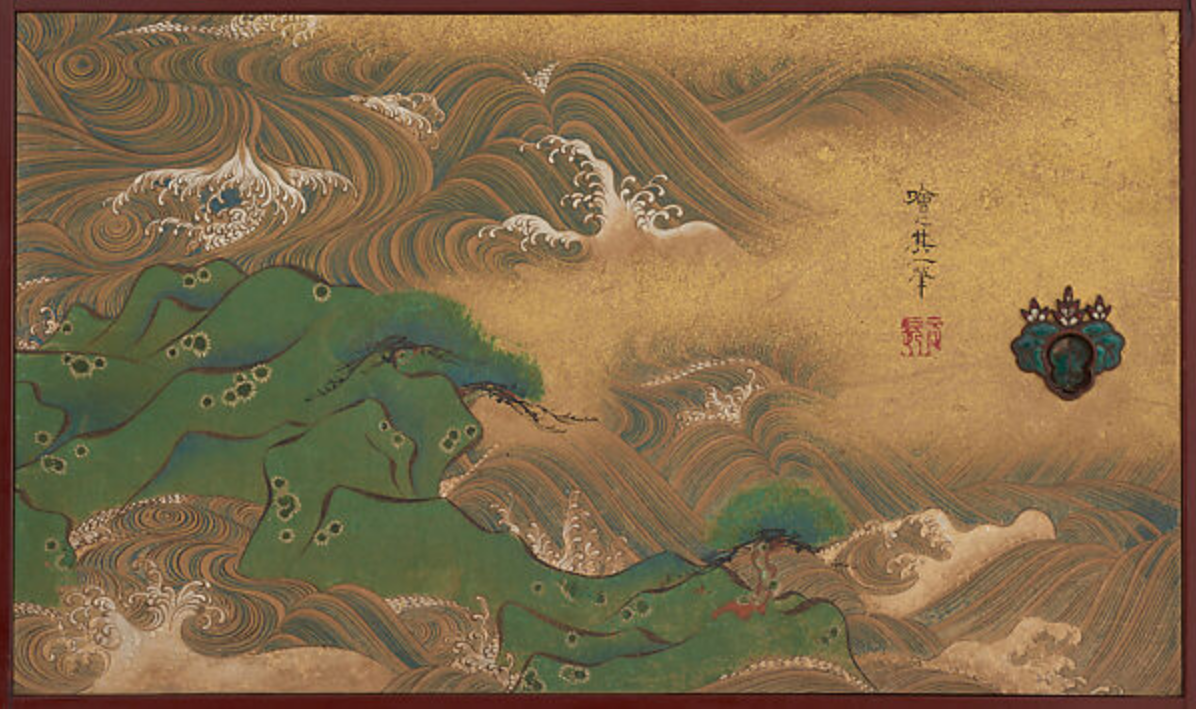
A sliding door from Suzuki Kiitsu's Waves at Matsushima, c.1832-36

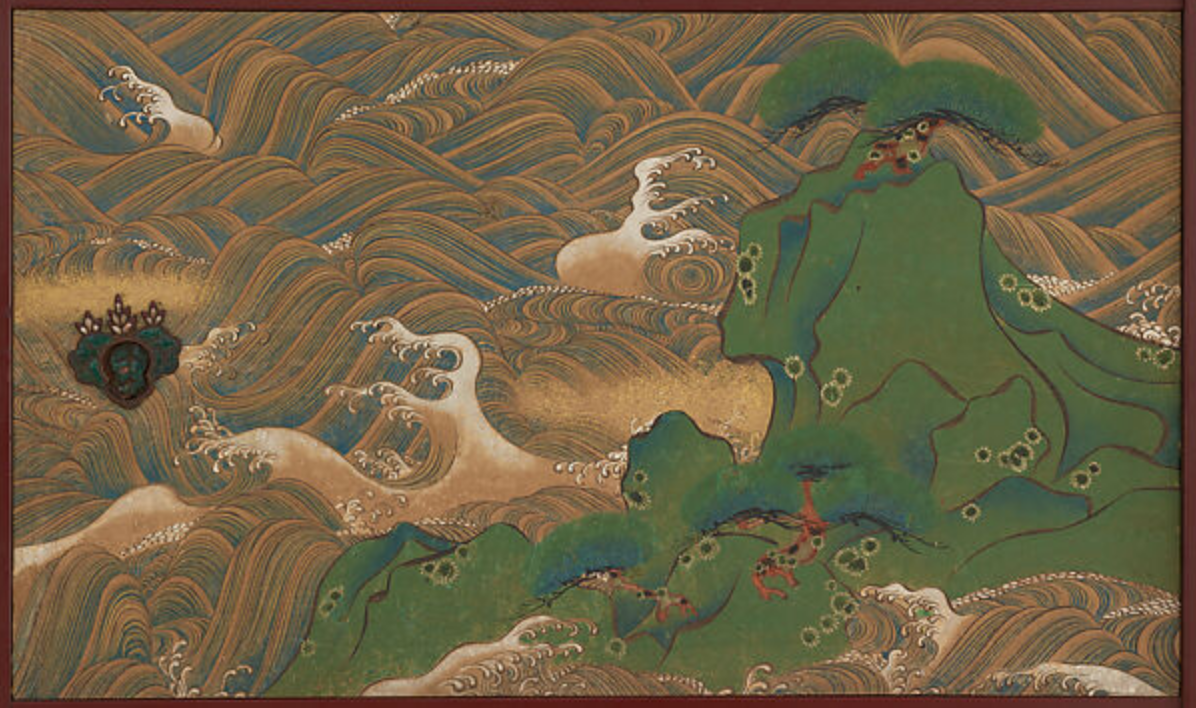
The other sliding door of Kiitsu's

== Sources ==
- Totman, Conrad (1995). Early Modern Japan, University of California Press. ISBN 9780520203563
- Carpenter, John T. (2012). Designing Nature: The Rinpa Aesthetic in Japanese Art, Metropolitan Museum of Art. ISBN 9780300184990
- Feltens, Frank (2021). Ogata Kōrin: Art in Early Modern Japan, Yale University Press. ISBN 9780300256918
- Ann Nishimura Morse, Nobuo Tsuji (1998). Japanese Art in the Museum of Fine Arts, Boston, Museum of Fine Arts, Boston. ISBN 9780878464647
- Danielle Elisseeff, Vadime Elisseeff (1985). Art of Japan, University of Michigan. ISBN 9780810906426
- Guth, Christine M. E. (2015). Hokusai’s Great Wave: Biography of a Global Icon, University of Hawaii Press. ISBN 9780824853952
- Takeuchi, Melinda (1994). Taiga's True Views: The Language of Landscape Painting in Eighteenth-century Japan, Stanford University Press. ISBN 9780804720885
- Kita, Sandy (1999). The Last Tosa: Iwasa Katsumochi Matabei, Bridge to Ukiyo-e, University of Hawaiʻi Press. ISBN 9780824818265
