= Hosomi Museum =

Mosque in Kyoto, Japan

- 細見美術館
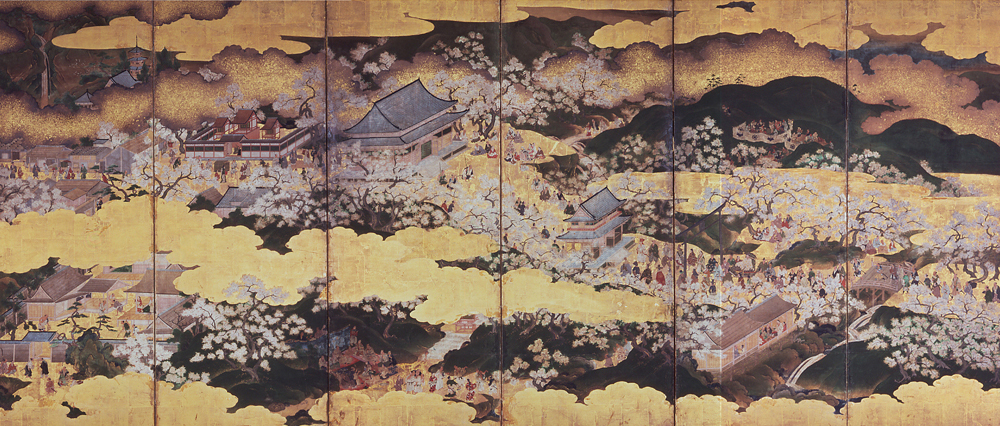
- Hanami at Yoshino (ICP)
- Interactive map of the Hosomi Museum area

General information
- Location: 6-3 Okazaki, Saishoji-chō, Sakyō-ku, Kyoto, Kyoto Prefecture, Japan
- Coordinates: 35°00′50″N 135°46′47″E
- Opened: 22 March 1998

Design and construction
- Architect: Ōe Tadasu (大江匡)

Website
- Official website

Hosomi Museum (細見美術館, Hosomi Bijutsukan) opened near Okazaki Park (岡崎公園) in Kyoto, Japan, in 1998. The collection, begun by Osaka industrialist Hosomi Ryō (細見良; 1901－1978), numbers some one thousand pieces including thirty Important Cultural Properties, ranging from haniwa and tea utensils to paintings of the Heian and Kamakura periods as well as by Itō Jakuchū and Katsushika Hokusai. These are exhibited on a rotating basis with four or five exhibitions each year.

== See also ==
- Kyoto National Museum
- Heian Jingū
