= Matsumoto Hōji =

Painter and print artist from Japan

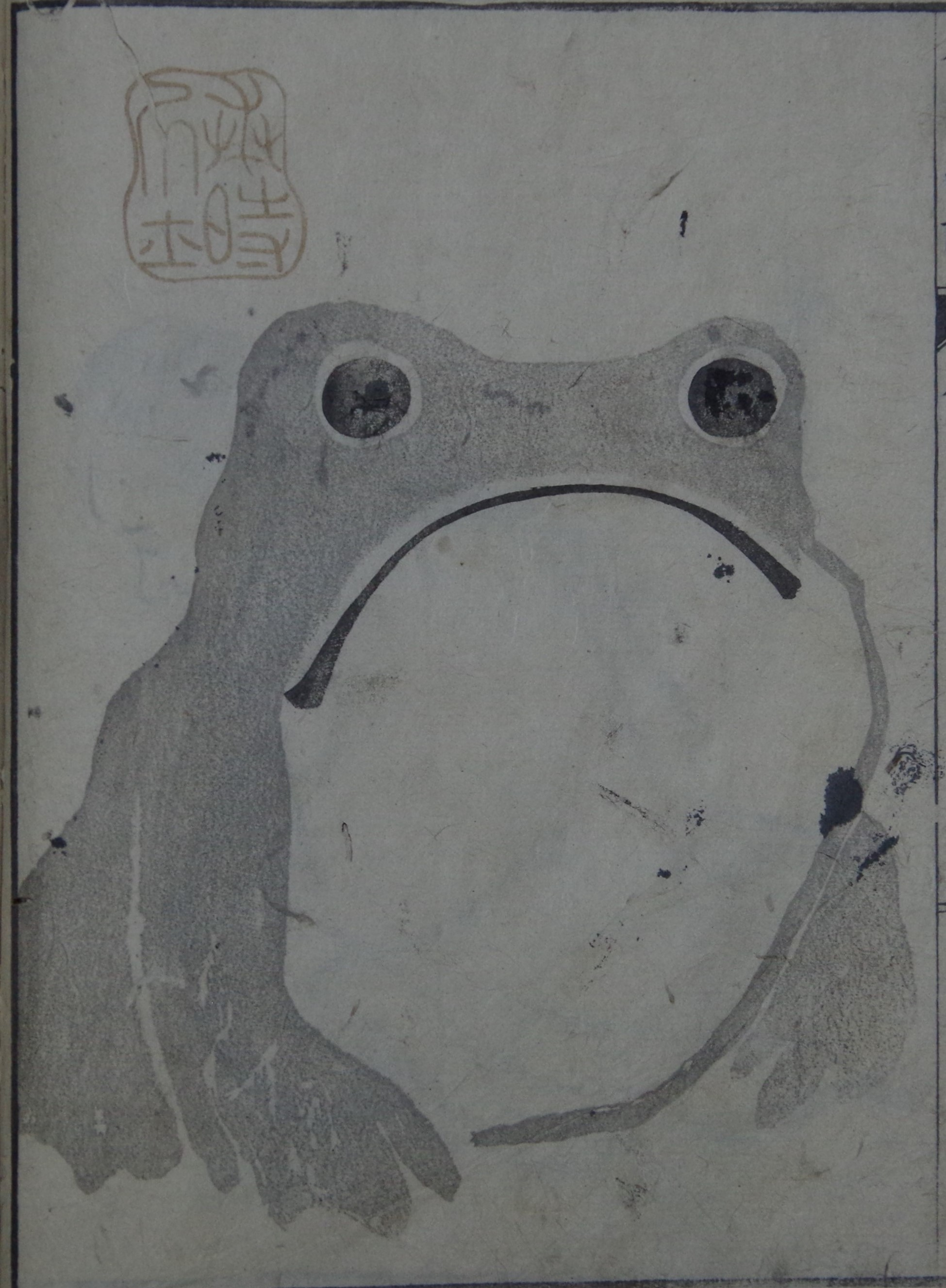
A toad from Meika Gafu collection of prints

Matsumoto Hōji (松本 奉時, date of birth unknown – September 30, 1800, Osaka), also known as Shusuke (周助/周介) and Hōji Dojin (奉時道人), was a mid-Edo period painter and picture framer. He was particularly fond of and skilled at ink-wash zenga paintings, especially those of Japanese toads.

== Life ==
He was active in Tenmei (1781–1788) and Kansei (1789–1801) eras. He hailed from Osaka, living in Edobori neighborhood.

He was a picture framer by profession, but also worked as an artist. He studied the landscape painting style of Yosa Buson.

He loved frogs, and was not satisfied with just raising and breeding them. He collected various frog-related items and often painted frogs. This passion was recorded in the "Kien Bunshu" by Kien Minagawa.

He had interactions with other artists of his time, and was close friends with Itō Jakuchū, who was active in the mid-Edo period. He even visited Sekihōji Temple, where Jakuchū lived in retirement in his later years, and there are also works that were influenced by Jakuchū. His other friends included Kimura Kenkadō and Kan Chazan.

There are several ink paintings of the same composition as the Toad, a representative work of Hōji, which are painted with large, dynamic brushstrokes. Many of these works are accompanied by inscriptions (san) by the Osaka poet Dōmyaku Sensei and it is believed the combination of Kansai’s poetry/inscriptions with Hōji’s painting was especially popular.

Hōji considered a dream of a dragon he had during the 6 year of Tenmei era (1786) to be a good omen, and from then on he actively began collecting calligraphy and paintings. He compiled the works he collected into art albums such as "Hōji Seiganjo" (奉時清玩帖) and treasured them as he asked the leading calligraphers, painters, and writers of the time to write their own works. In “Various Famous Masters’ Cooperation (by Matsumoto Hōji)" (諸名家合作(松本奉時に依る)), in addition to Jakuchū, there are contributions from a splendid lineup of artists from Kyoto and Osaka, such as Jiun Onkō, Hino Sukeki, Nakai Chikuzan, Rokujō Jishū, Hosoai Hansai, Minagawa Kien, Suminoe Buzen, Fukuhara Gogaku, Naka-E-Tochō, Mori Shūhō, Maruyama Ōzui, Mori Sosen, Kimura Kenkadō, Itō Zenshou, Nagasawa Rosetsu, Gazō Gessen, Ueda Koufu, Matsumura Goshun. On one album page Kimura Kenkadō drew "monkeys in bamboo" (竹に猿) with a brush, and the lower-left is stamped with Hōji’s own collector’s seal.

== Works ==
- Toad Painting/Frog Painting (Gama-zu – 蝦蟇図／蛙図) – multiple versions exist.
- White Elephant Painting (Byakuzō-zu = 白象図) – inscribed in the painting that it follows the style of Ito Jakuchū, in private collection.
- Daikokuten Painting (Daikokuten-zu - 大黒天図) – in the collection of Hōzō-ji temple.
- Frog Album (蛙画帖) – by Matsumoto Hōji.
- Meika Gafu (名画画譜) – compiled by Niwa Bankanshi, with contributions by Matsumoto Hōji and others.

== Albums ==
- Hōji Seigan-chō (奉時清玩帖)
- Various Famous Masters’ Cooperation (by Matsumoto Hōji) (諸名家合作（松本奉時に依る）) - dated Kansei 8–10 (1796–1798)

== Sources ==
- 中谷伸生, Lecture record: Kansai University 120th Anniversary Commemorative Lecture Paintings from the Osaka Art World (関西大学創立120周年記念講演会「大阪画壇の絵画」), Kansai University Library Forum No. 12, 2007
- Osaka Museum of History, Frog-painting Artist Matsumoto Hōji and the Early Modern Osaka Painting Circle(かえるの絵描・松本奉持と近世大阪画壇), 49th Special Exhibition, October 2007
- Kimura Kenkadō, Wazosho Kanbon Kenkadō Nikki (和図書 完本蒹葭堂日記), Geika Shoin (藝華書院), May 2009.
- Osaka History Museum, Kumamoto Prefectural Museum of Art, NHK Planet Kinki. Exhibition catalogue: Animal Picture-Painters: The Sosen Three Brothers — Chicken Jakuchū, Frog Hōji
- Fuchū Art Museum, Japan and Europe: Strange, Cute, Rebellious — Animal Pictures (日本とヨーロッパ ふしぎ・かわいい・へそまがり 動物の絵). Kodansha 2021.
