= Itō Jakuchū =

Japanese painter (1716–1800)

- 伊藤 若冲
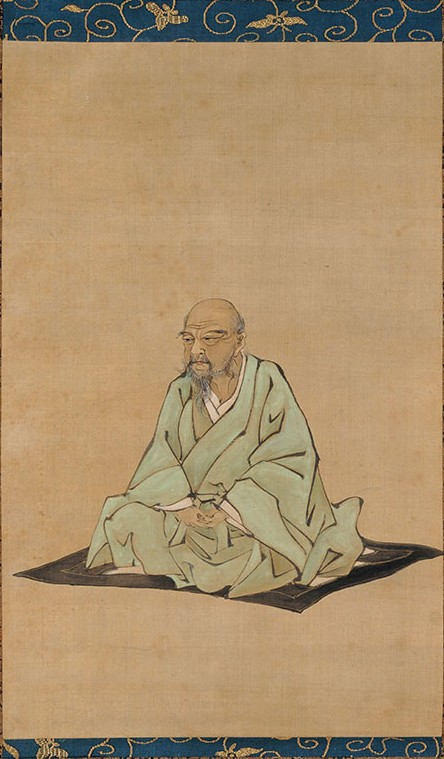
- A portrait of Itō Jakuchū drawn by Kubota Beisen on the 85th anniversary of his death
- Born: March 2, 1716
- Died: October 27, 1800 (aged 84)
- Known for: Painter
- Notable work: Pictures of the Colorful Realm of Living Beings

Itō Jakuchū (伊藤 若冲; 2 March 1716 – 27 October 1800) was a Japanese painter of the mid-Edo period, when Japan had isolated itself from the outside world. Many of his paintings concern traditionally Japanese subjects, particularly chickens and other birds. Many of his otherwise traditional works display a great degree of experimentation with perspective, and with other very modern stylistic elements.

His realistic style of painting made him very popular along with Maruyama Ōkyo, and he was listed as the second painter after Ōkyo in the second and third editions of the Heian Jinbutsushi (平安人物志), a directory of famous people living in Kyoto at the time. He held strong ties to Zen Buddhist ideals, and was considered a lay brother (koji); but he was also keenly aware of his role within a Kyoto society that was becoming increasingly commercial.

In 1970, Nobuo Tsuji published a book entitled Kisō no Keifu (奇想の系譜, Lineage of Eccentrics), which focused on painters of the "Lineage of Eccentrics" who broke with tradition, such as Itō Jakuchū, Iwasa Matabei, Kanō Sansetsu, Soga Shōhaku, Nagasawa Rosetsu, and Utagawa Kuniyoshi. This work has revolutionized the view of Japanese art history, and Edo period painting has become the most popular field of Japanese art, with Itō Jakuchū being the most popular. In recent years, scholars and art exhibitions have often added Hakuin Ekaku and Suzuki Kiitsu to the six artists listed by Tsuji, calling them the painters of the "Lineage of Eccentrics".

== Biography ==
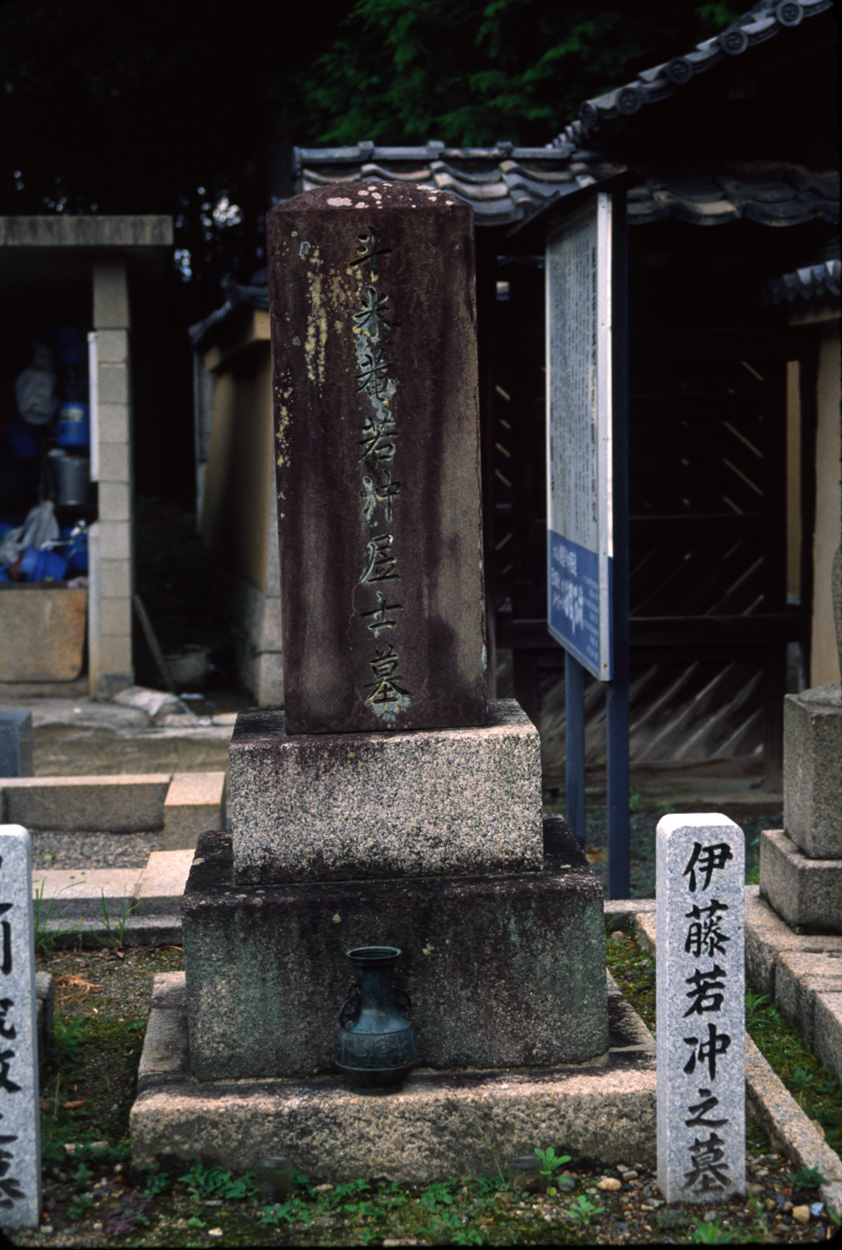
Grave of Itō Jakuchū, Kyoto

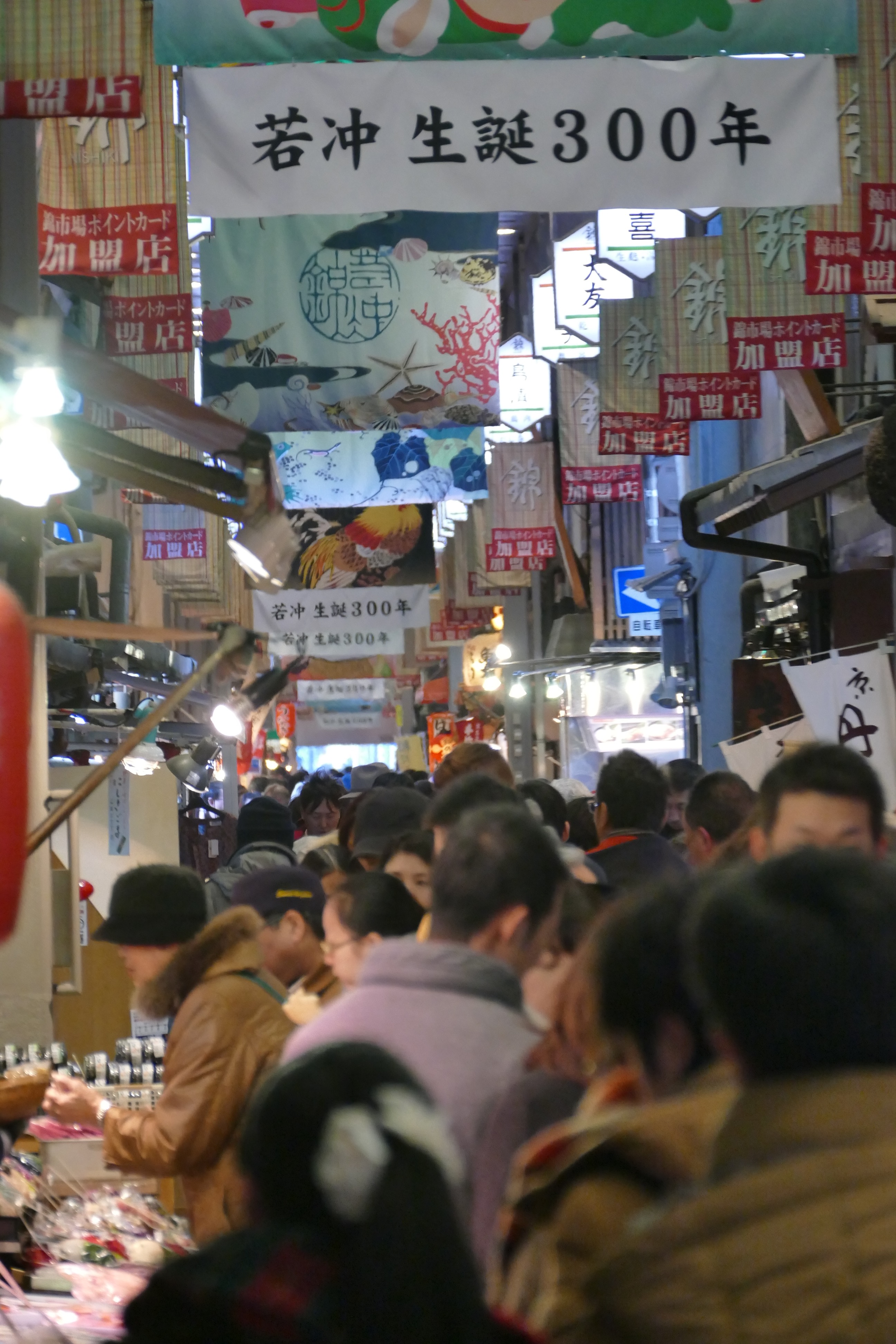
Nishiki Market, where Jakuchū's grocery shop was located, celebrated the 300th anniversary of his birth in 2016.

Itō Jakuchū was the eldest son of Itō Genzaemon, a Kyoto grocer whose shop, called Masuya, lay in the center of downtown, in the Nishiki food district. He showed a great talent for painting from childhood, and it is said that he studied under Ōoka Shunboku, an Osaka-based Kano school artist known for his bird and flower paintings, when he was in his mid-teens. However, he did not seem to be accustomed to the strict teachings of the Kano school, and he honed his skills on his own by observing and sketching the things around him, such as the vegetables sold at his father's shop, the fish in the Nishiki market, and the chickens in his garden, and by using Chinese paintings as a reference. Though a number of his paintings depict exotic or fantastic creatures, such as tigers and phoenixes, it is evident from the detail and lifelike appearance of his paintings of chickens and other animals that he based his work on actual observation. In 1739, when he was 23 years old, his father died suddenly and he took over the grocery shop. However, he was so absorbed in painting that he neglected the shop.

Jakuchū built a two-story studio on the west bank of the Kamo River in his late thirties. He called it Shin'en-kan (心遠館, Villa of the Detached Heart [or Mind]), after a phrase from a poem by the ancient Chinese poet Tao Qian. It was around this time that Jakuchū befriended Daiten Kenjō, a Rinzai monk who would later become abbot of the Kyoto temple Shōkoku-ji. Through this friendship Jakuchū gained access to the temple's collection of Japanese and Chinese paintings, and gained introduction to new social and artistic circles. It is thought that Daiten may have been the one to first conceive of the name "Jakuchū", taken from the Tao Te Ching and meaning "like the void".

From Doshoku Sai-e (Realm of Living Beings, National Treasure)

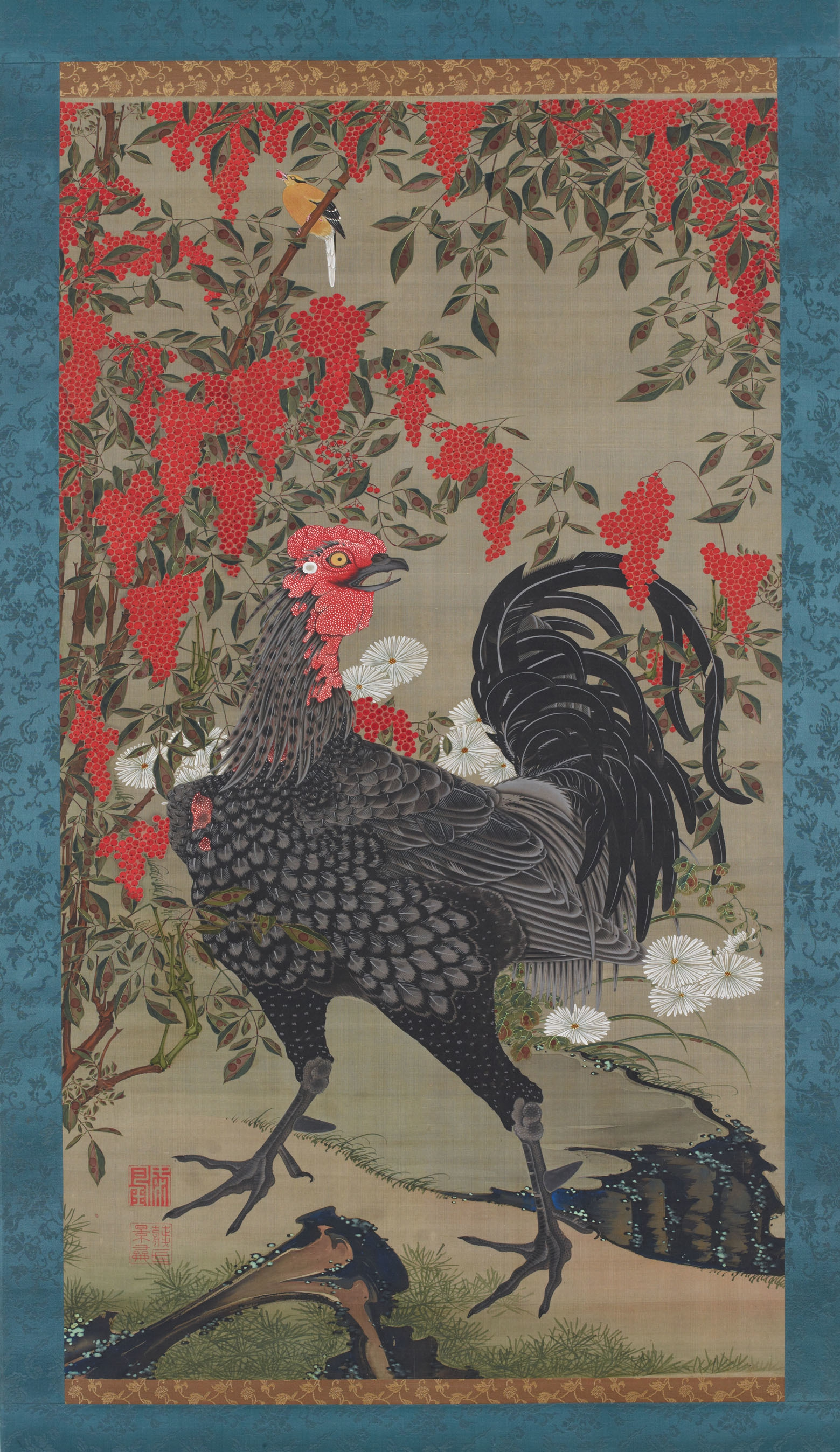
Black rooster and nandin

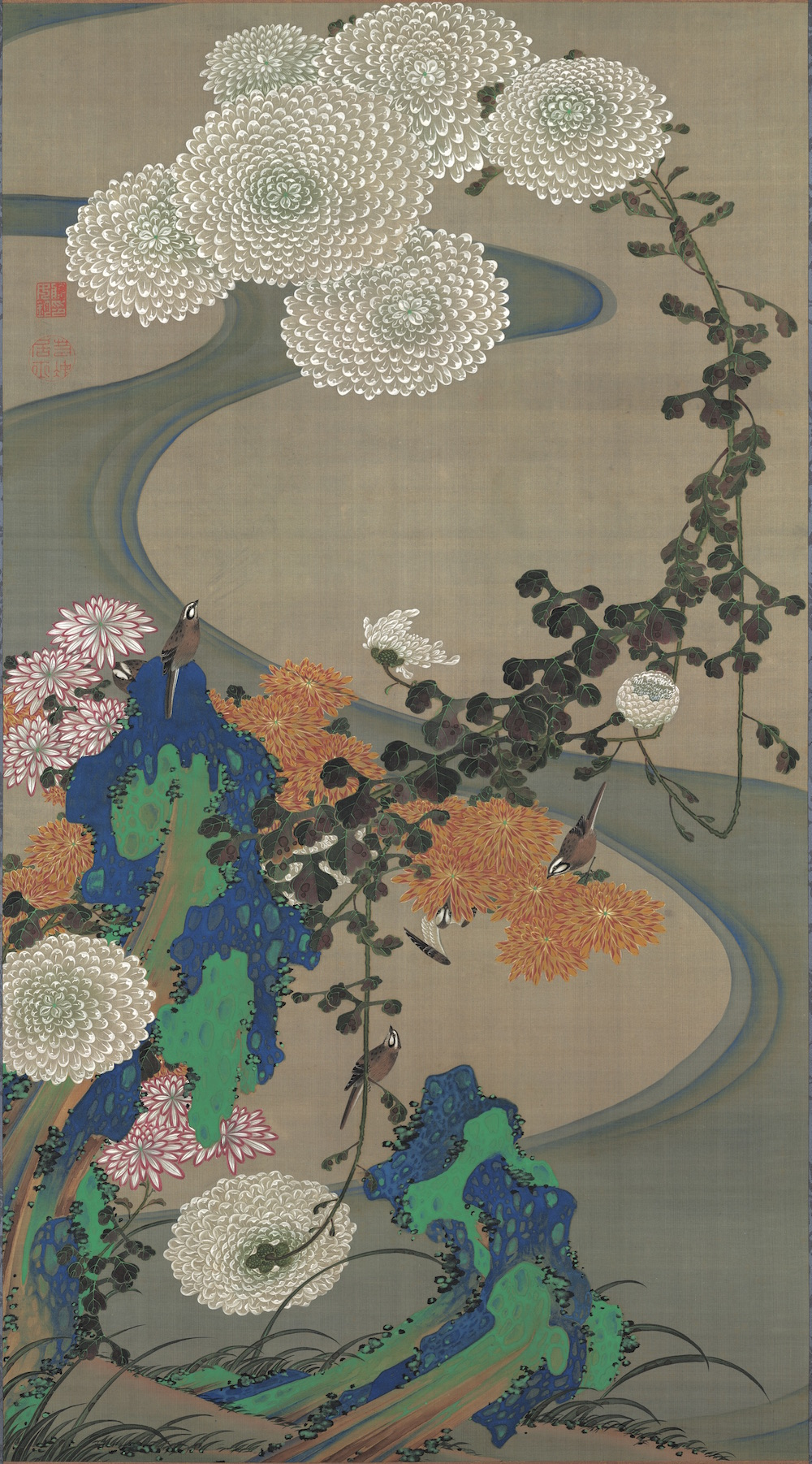
Chrysanthemums by a stream with rocks

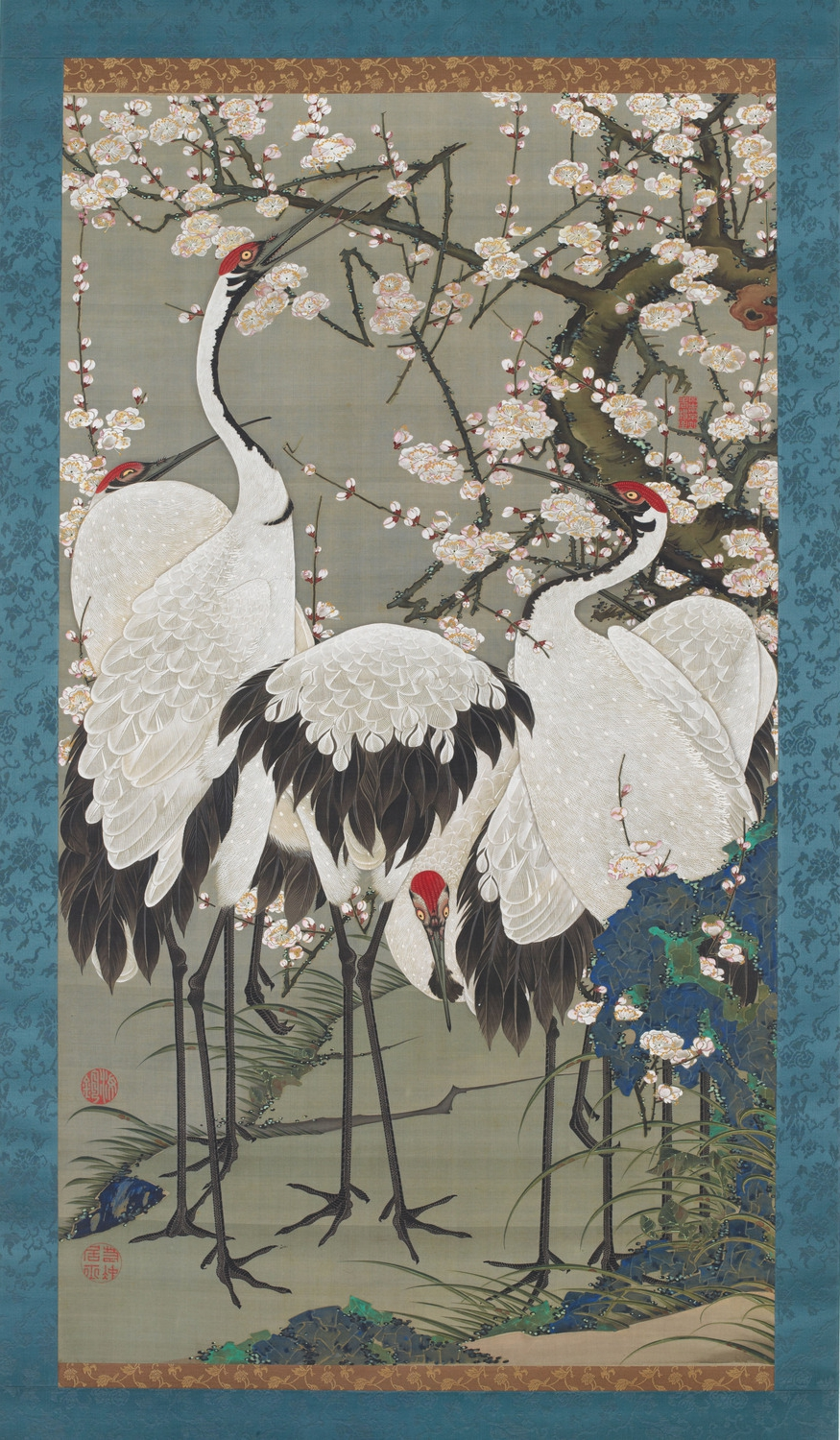
Plum Blossoms and Cranes

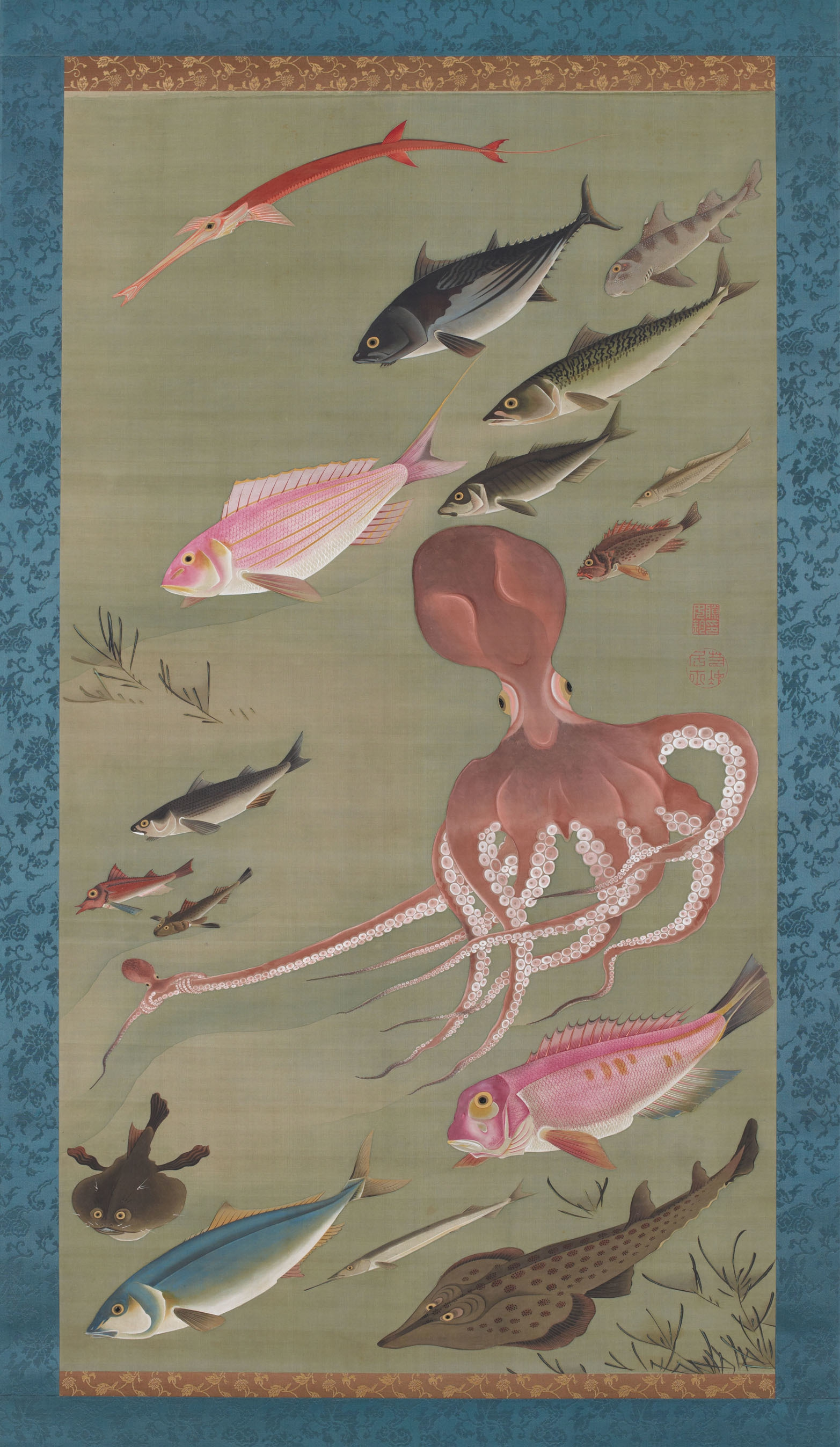
Fish and octopus

In 1756, when he was forty years old, he gave up managing the grocery store, retired, and moved to Shōkoku-ji to devote himself to painting. In 1758, when he was forty-two years old, he began to paint Doshoku Sai-e (動植綵絵, 'Colorful Realm of Living Beings'), a series of paintings depicting various animals and plants, as a memorial to his parents and youngest brother, who had died prematurely, and as a wish for his own future. At the age of fifty-one, he completed 30 Doshoku Sai-e and three Shaka Sanzon-zu (釈迦三尊図, Shaka Triad) and donated them to Shōkoku-ji. These works were very popular at the time and spread Jakuchu's fame. The Doshoku Sai-e is now designated as a National Treasure and is considered one of the greatest masterpieces not only by Jakuchū but also in the history of Japanese painting.

Well-known and well-reputed in the Kyoto art community, Jakuchū received many commissions for screen paintings, and was at one time featured above a number of other notable artists in the Record of Heian Notables (平安人物志, Heian jinbutsu-shi). In addition to personal commissions, Jakuchū was also commissioned to paint panels or screens for many Buddhist temples and Shinto shrines across Japan. One example is the 50 murals of Kinkaku-ji Temple that he painted at the request of Daiten Kenjō when he was forty-four years old. Most painters would have chosen pine trees, bamboo, plum trees, or Mount Fuji as their subjects, but Jakuchū broke with conventional wisdom and painted grape and banana trees. These 50 murals have been designated as Important Cultural Properties and are housed in the Jotenkaku Museum in Shokoku-ji.

In his fifties and sixties he produced prints and ink paintings, but during this period he was appointed to the important position of machi doshiyori (町年寄り) at the Nishiki Market, so the number of his works decreased compared to the previous years. At that time, the Nishiki Market was on the verge of extinction, and he worked desperately to keep it alive, and his activities at that time were recorded in books.

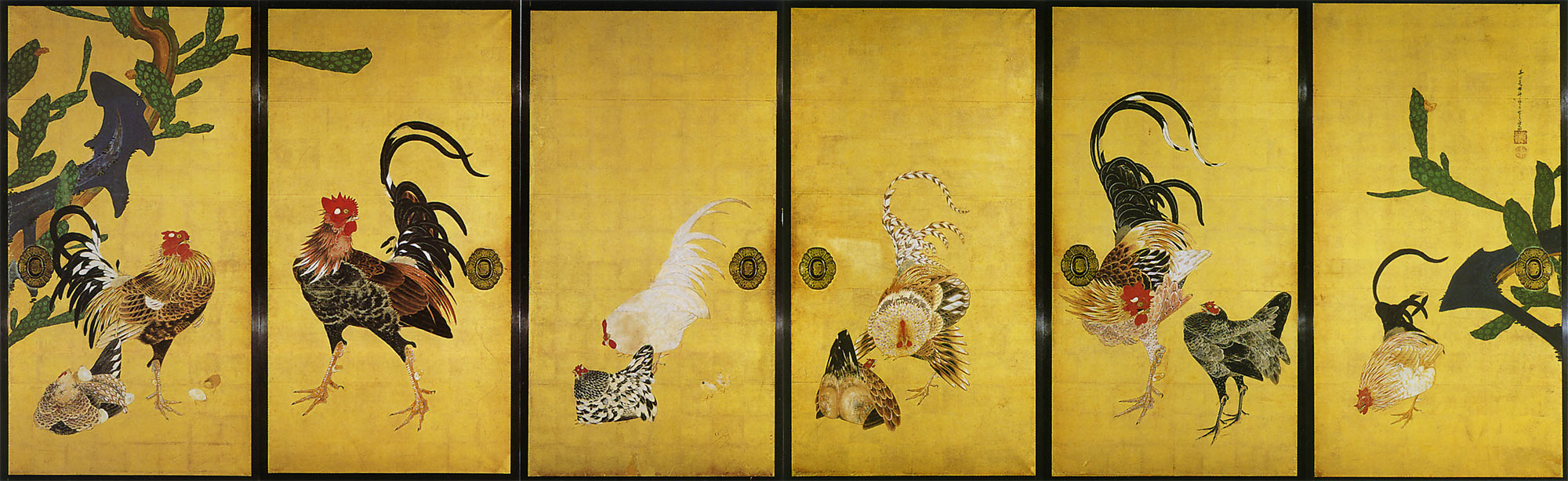
Saboten Gunkei-zu Fusuma-e (仙人掌群鶏図襖絵, Cactus and Domestic Fowls), Saifuku-ji temple Fusuma painting. Important Cultural Property

It was not until he was in his 70s that he began to paint actively again. He lost his house in the Great Tenmei Fire around this time and moved to Osaka to seek support from a cultural figure named Kimura Kenkado (木村蒹葭堂), but his passion for painting did not wane, and he painted many large works, including Saboten Gunkei-zu Fusuma (仙人掌群鶏図襖絵, Cactus and Domestic Fowls).

Despite his individualism and involvement in the scholarly and artistic community of Kyoto, Jakuchū was always strongly religious, and retired towards the end of his life to Sekihōji Temple a Manpuku-ji branch temple on the southern outskirts of Kyoto. There, he gathered a number of followers, such as his friend Matsumoto Hōji, and continued to paint until his death at the age of eighty-four.

== Notable works ==
=== Doshoku Sai-e (Colorful Realm of Living Beings) ===
A very common theme among his work is birds, in particular hens and roosters, though several of his more famous paintings depict cranes, cockatoos, parrots, and phoenixes.

One of his most ambitious endeavors, and therefore most famous works, is known as the "Pictures of the Colorful Realm of Living Beings" (動植綵絵, Dōshoku sai-e). Begun around 1757 and not finished until 1765, the Pictures are a set of thirty hanging scrolls created as a personal offering to the Shōkoku-ji temple. In his deed of the gift, Jakuchu notes "in the hope that they will always be utilized as objects of solemn reference." They depict a number of animal subjects in monumental scale and with an according degree of detail. The paintings are composed using different colored pigments on silk. Today, Dōshoku sai-e is owned by the Museum of the Imperial Collections. Most of Itō Jakuchū's recovered paintings were ink on a hanging scroll, byōbu (屏風, folding screens), or fusuma (襖, sliding doors) panels. However, later in his career, Itō Jakuchū would go on to enjoy painting on handscrolls.

From Doshoku Sai-e (Realm of Living Beings, National Treasure)

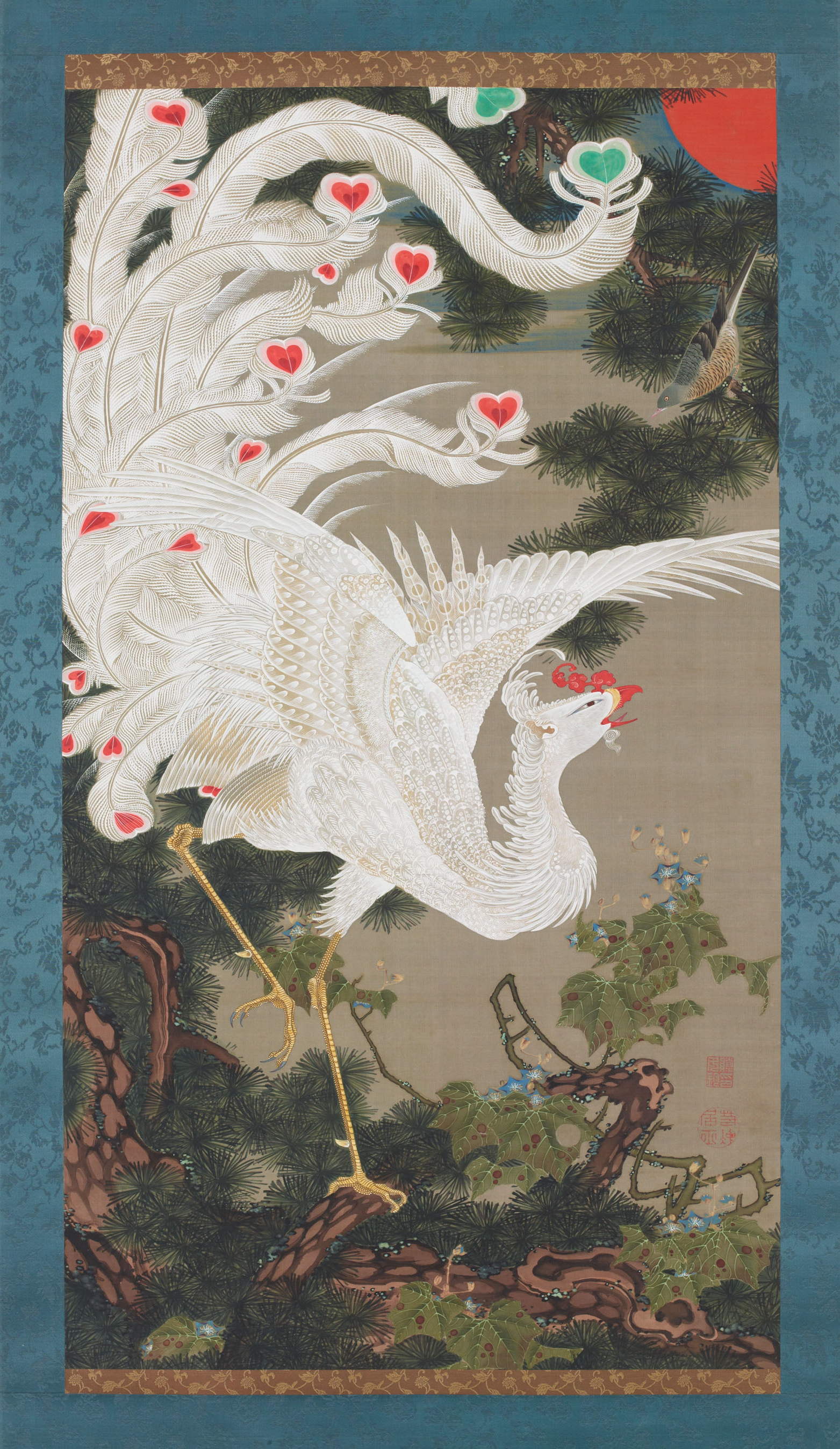
Old Pine Tree and White Phoenix

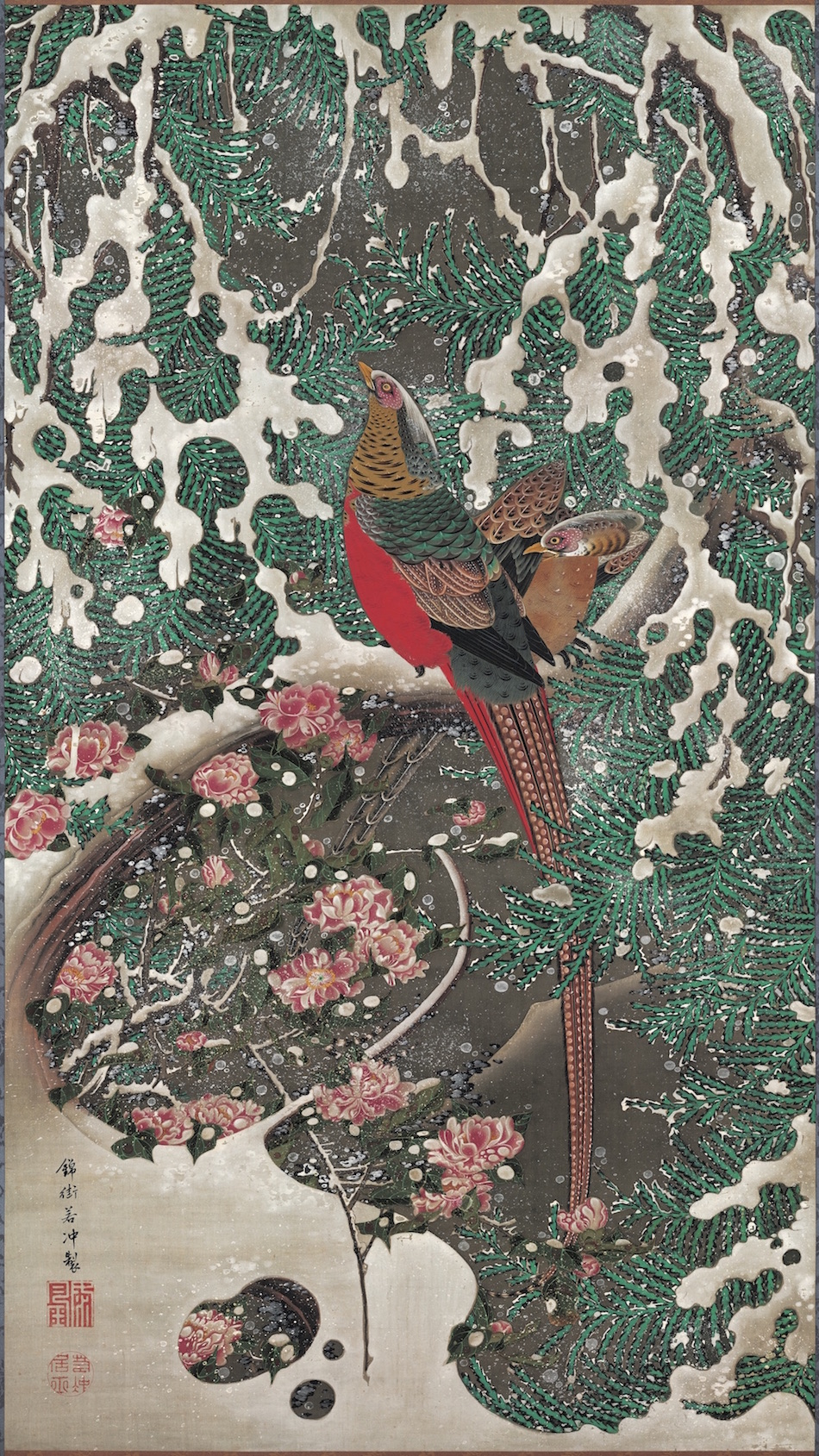
Golden Pheasants in Snow

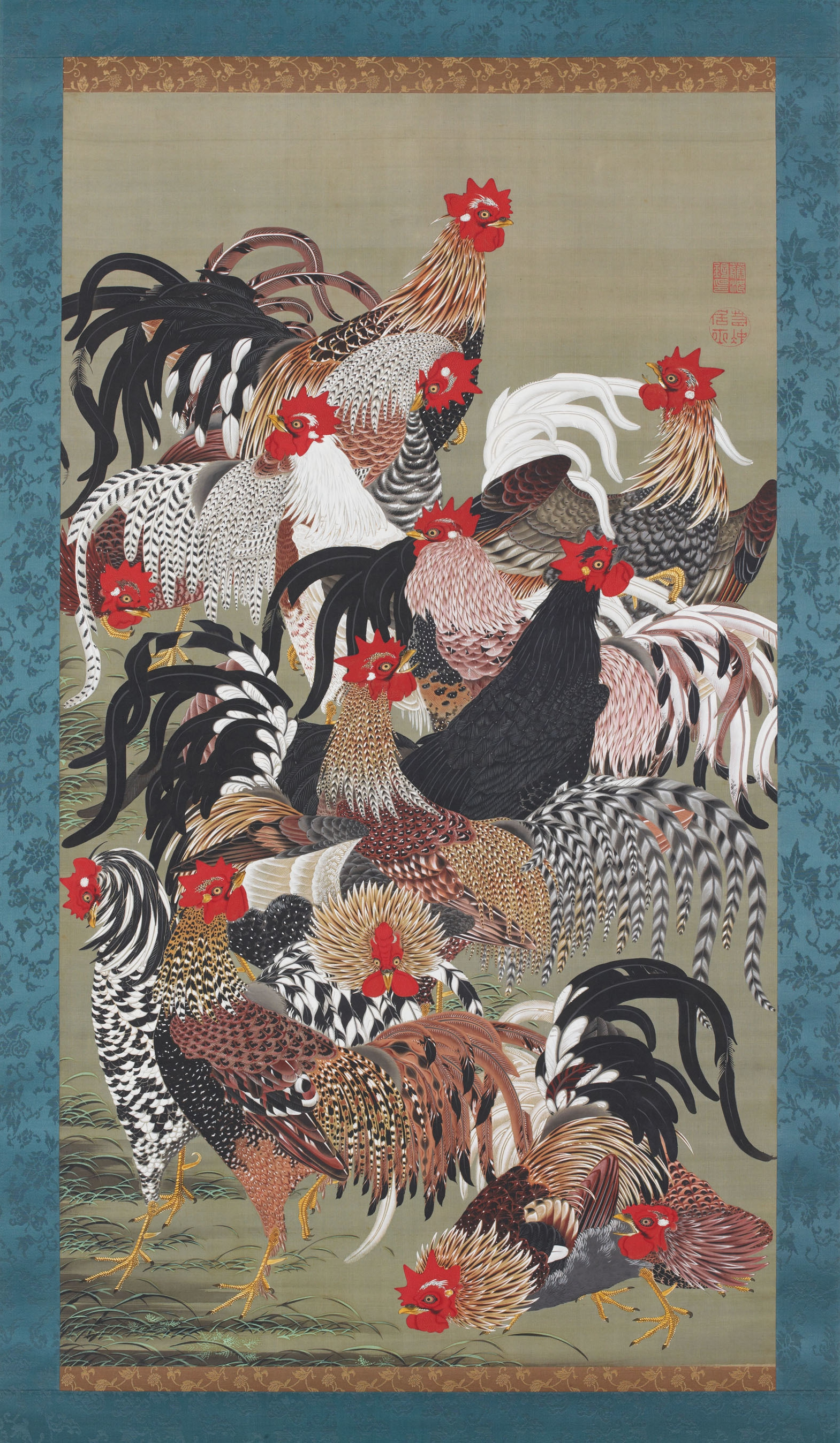
Fowls

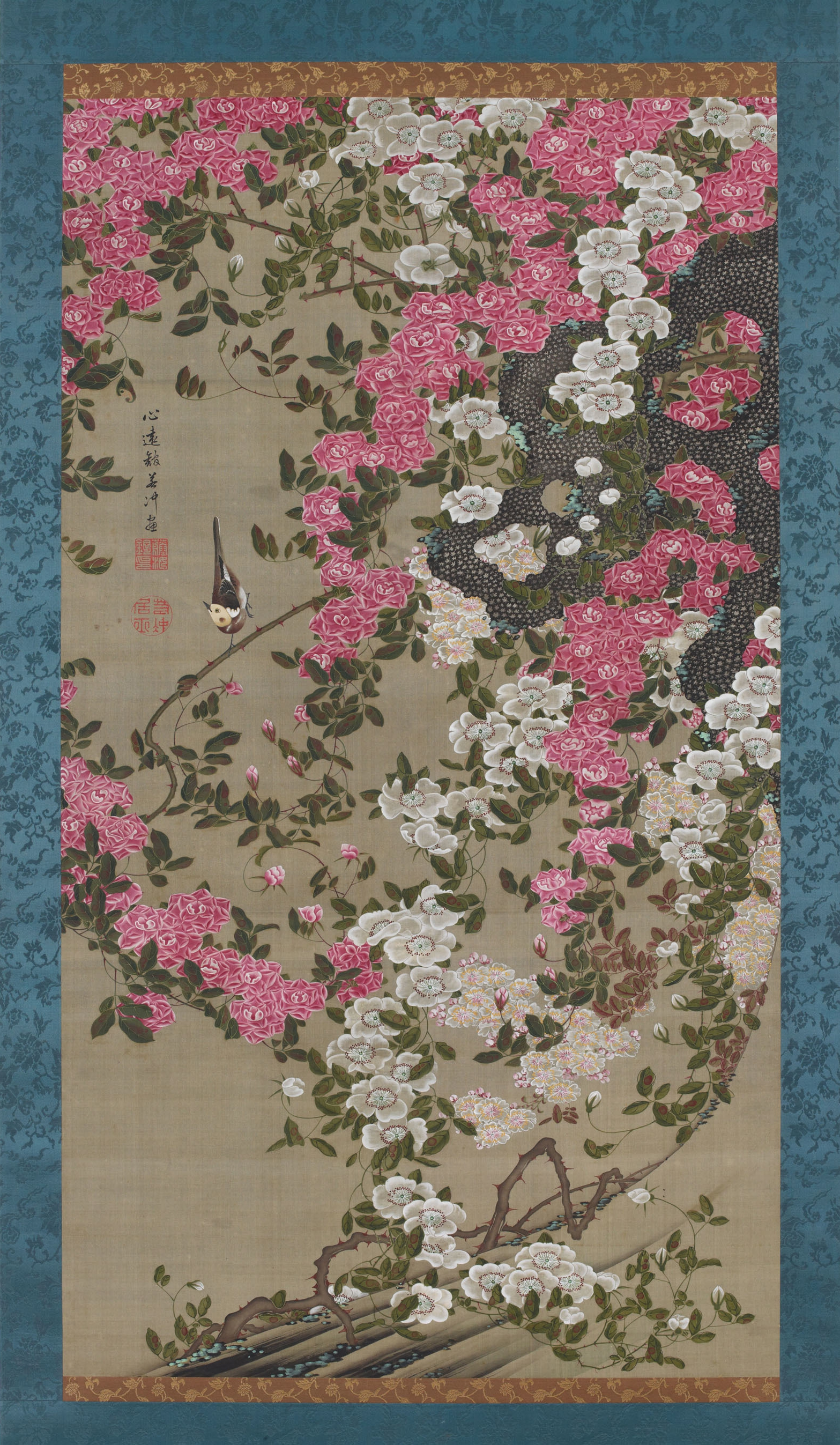
Roses and Small Bird

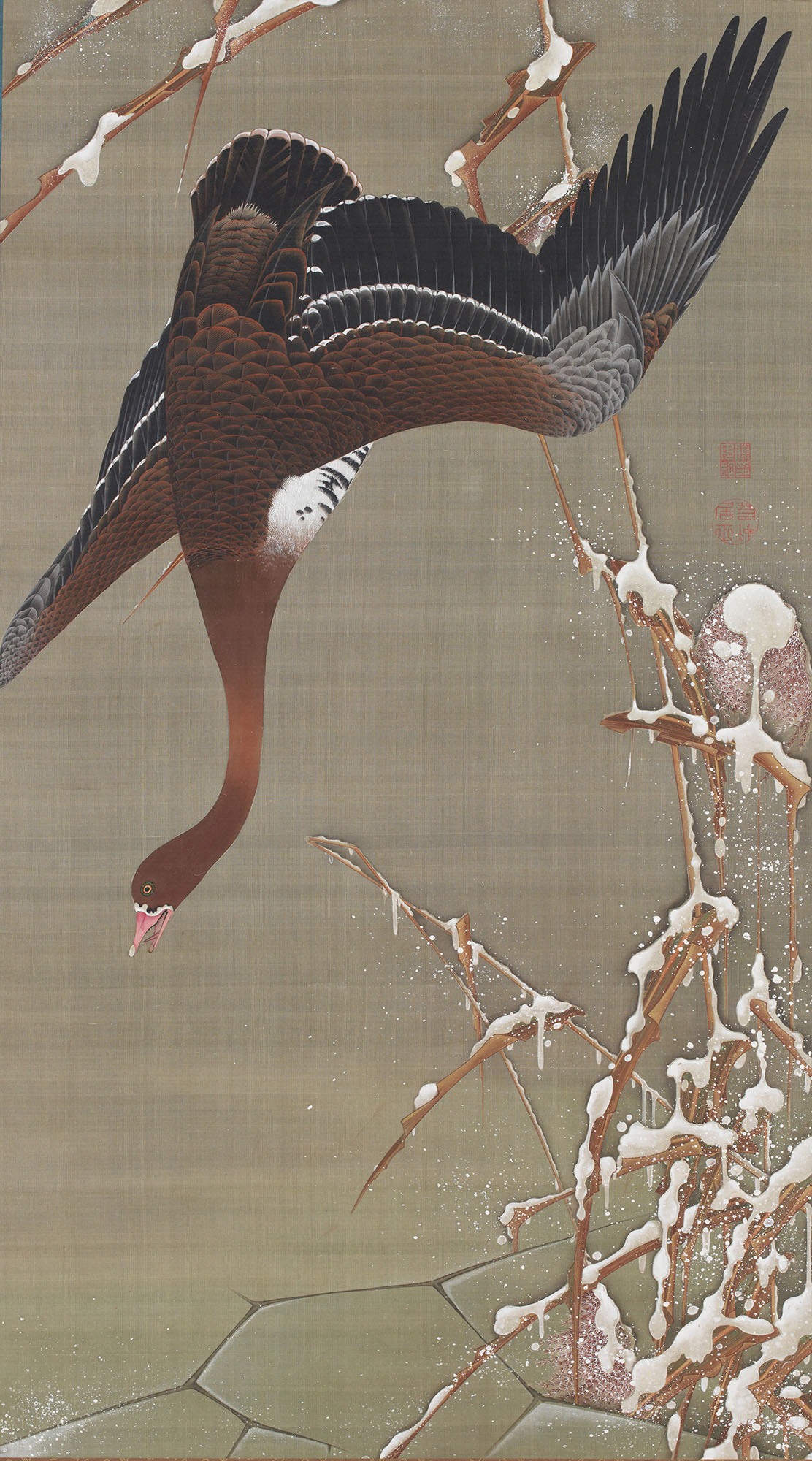
Wild Goose and Reeds

=== Birds and Animals in the Flower Garden ===
==== Chōjū kaboku-zu byōbu ====
Another of his famous pieces, dubbed Chōjū kaboku-zu byōbu (鳥獣花木図屏風, Birds and Animals in the Flower Garden), is arguably one of the most modern-looking pieces to come out of Japan during this period. The piece, one of a pair of sixfold screens, depicts a white elephant and a number of other animals in a garden. What makes it unique, eccentric and modern is the division of the entire piece into a grid of squares (or, in modern terms, the painting is "pixelated") roughly a centimeter on each side. Each square was colored individually, in order to create the resulting aggregate image. Today, Chōjūkaboku-zu byōbu is owned by the Idemitsu Museum of Arts.

==== Juka chōjū-zu byōbu ====
The Juka chōjū-zu byōbu (樹花鳥獣図屏風, Birds and Animals in the Flower Garden) owned by the Shizuoka Prefectural Museum of Art is a work that, like the Chōjū kaboku-zu byōbu, depicts animals painted in many small squares. The production method involves first drawing lines at approximately 1 cm intervals with light sumi ink to create a grid across the entire screen. On top of that, a very light color that matches the design is thinly painted to create the base. Next, each square of the grid is filled in with a slightly darker color than before, forming a square shape. A darker color is added in small amounts to the corners of each square, completing one square of the grid. This technique, called masume gaki (枡目描き), was invented by Jakuchū, and only three works, including the Hakuzo Gunju-zu (白象群獣図, White Elephant and Animals), exist using this technique.

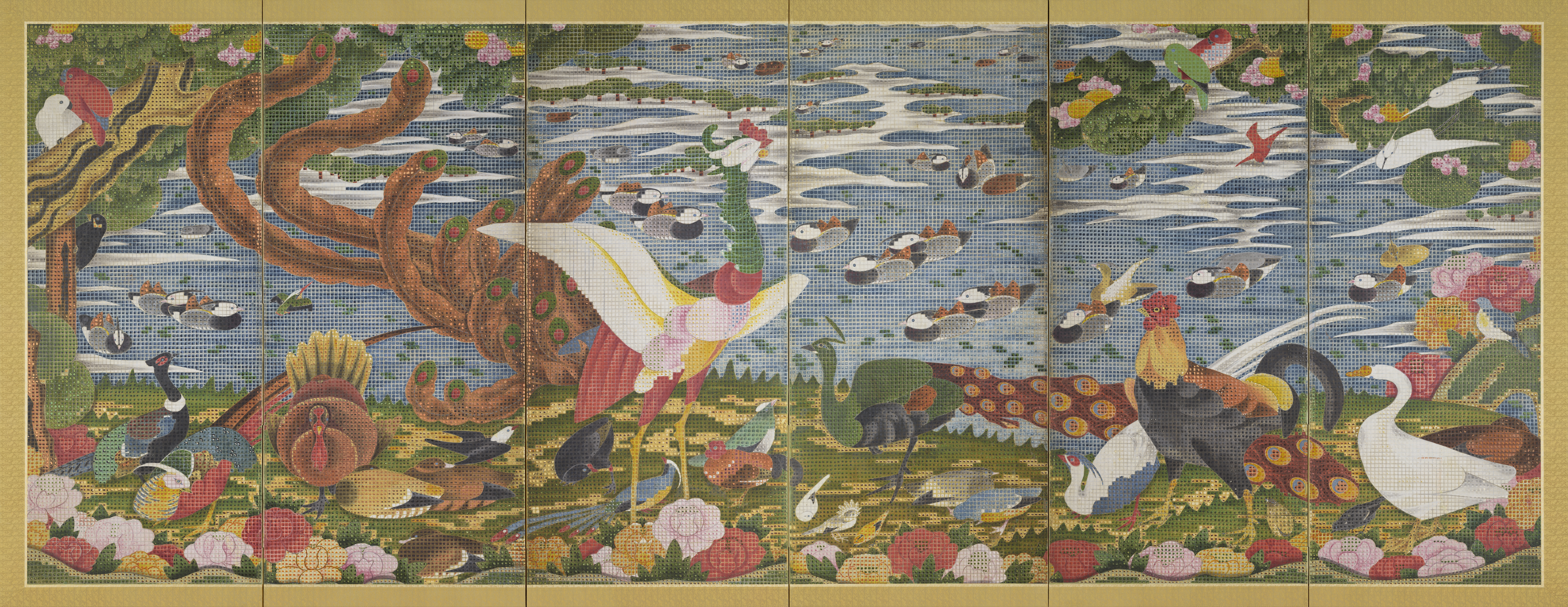
Juka Choju-zu Byobu (樹花鳥獣図屏風, Birds and Animals in the Flower Garden (left panel))

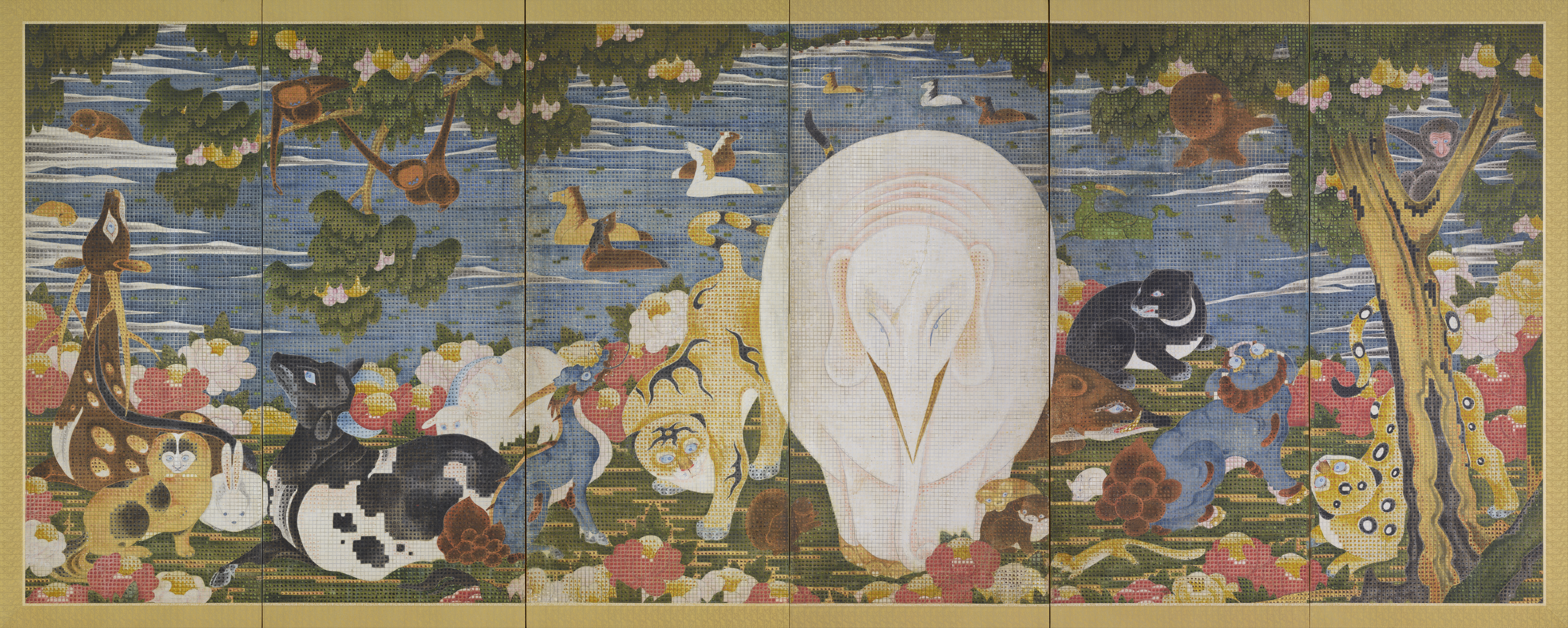
Juka Choju-zu Byobu (樹花鳥獣図屏風, Birds and Animals in the Flower Garden (right panel))

=== Zo to Kujira-zu byōbu (Elephant and Whale) ===
This large work, the last phase of Jakuchū's painting career, painted when he was eighty years old, was discovered in an old house in the Hokuriku region in 2008 and attracted much attention in Japan. It is owned by the Miho Museum. Although elephants do not live in Japan, in 1728 two elephants were brought from Vietnam to Nagasaki to be shown to Shogun Tokugawa Yoshimune, and they were paraded around Edo and Kyoto, which was a great hit with many Japanese at the time. According to Nobuo Tsuji, an authority on Jakuchū who authenticated this work as a genuine work by Jakuchū, it is possible that Jakuchū saw the elephants in Kyoto when he was fourteen years old. It is also possible that he saw the whale either in Kishū, where whaling was popular, or in Osaka, where whales were exhibited at fairs. Tsuji speculated that a wealthy merchant may have commissioned this work from Jakuchū in order to show it to a large crowds, since it was common for wealthy merchants to show (byōbu) to large crowds during the Gion Festival, and eccentric designs such as this one were especially popular for this purpose. Another work similar to this one, with an elephant and a whale, was once sold at auction during the Showa era (1926-1989), but is now missing.

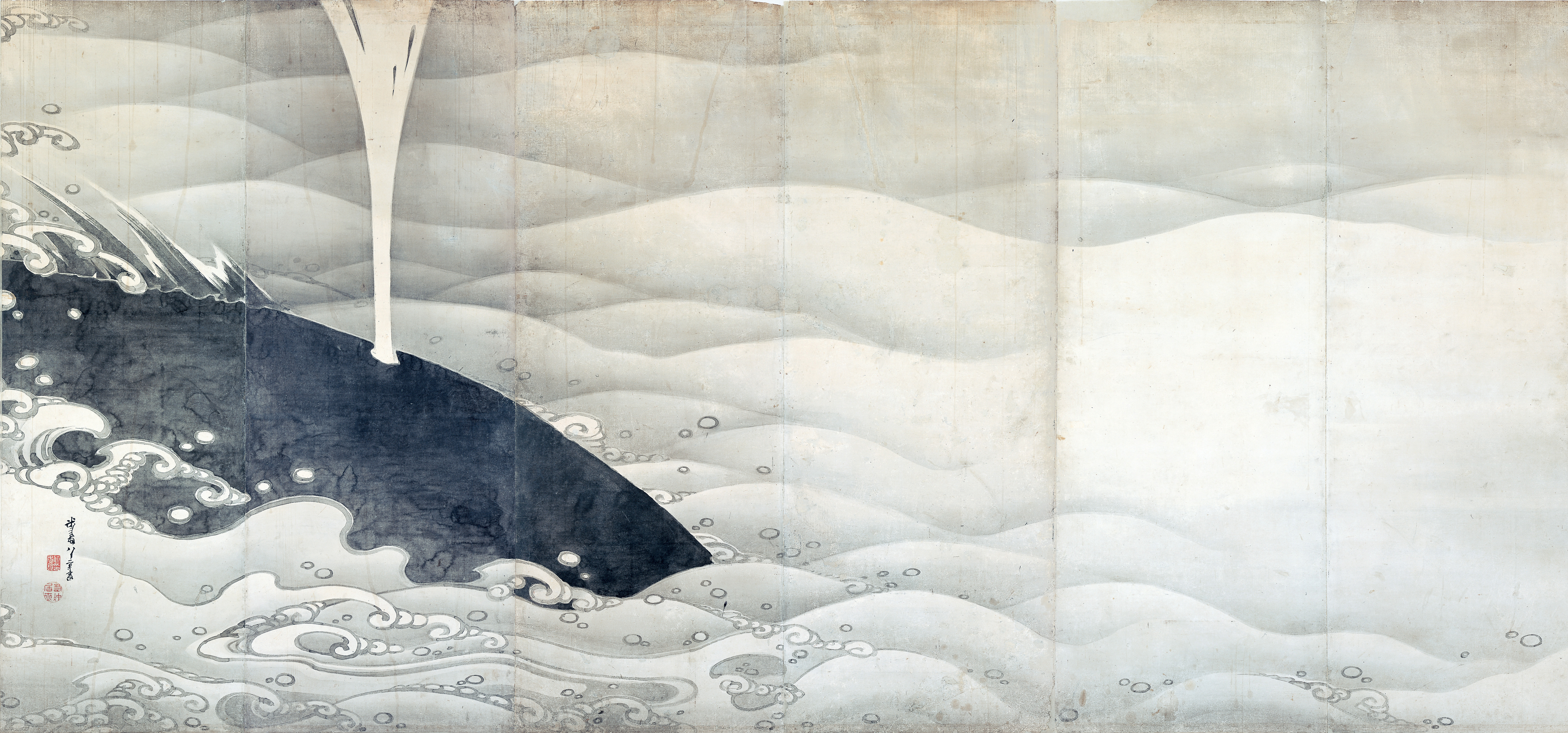
Zo to Kujira-zu byōbu (象と鯨図屏風, Elephant and Whale (left panel))

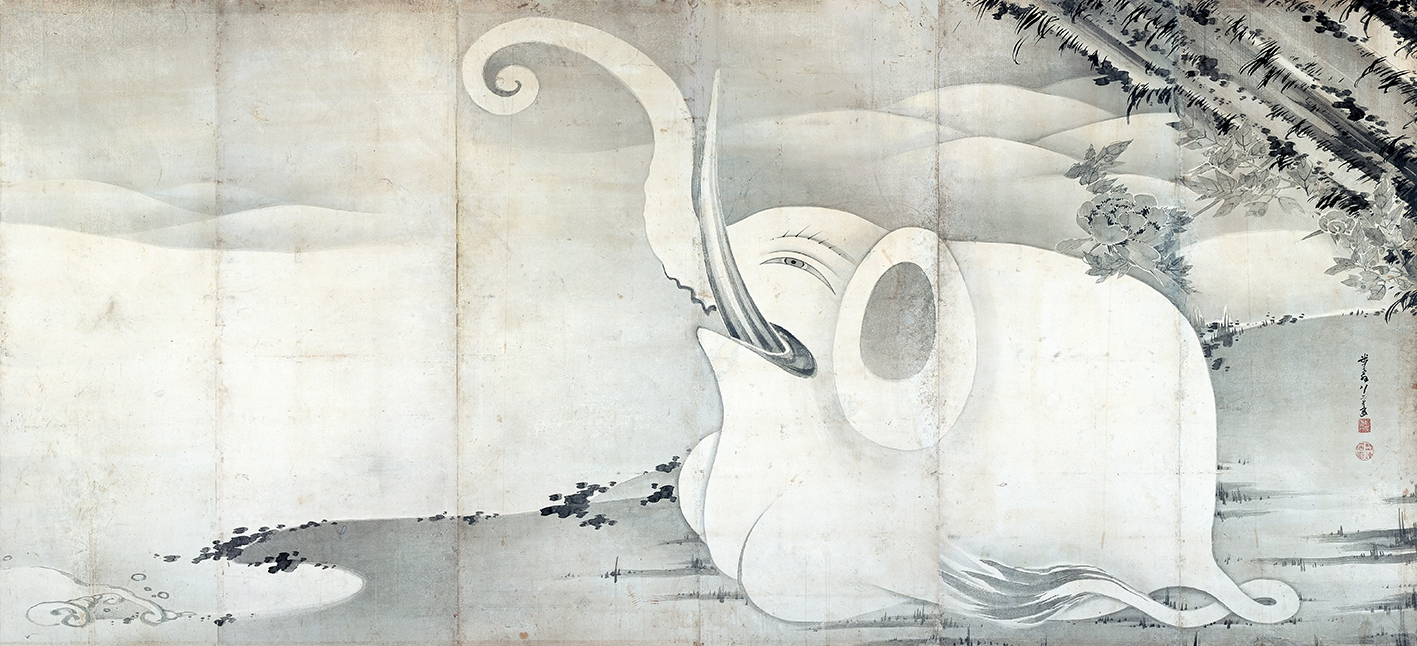
Zo to Kujira-zu byōbu (right panel)

=== Saichufu (Compendium of Vegetables and Insects) ===
Notable example of Jakuchū's emakimono (handscrolls) is his work "Compendium of Vegetables and Insects" (Saichufu). The 40-foot scroll is a painting of almost ninety different fruits and vegetables, fifty-some varieties of insects, and other animals. Some of which include: plums, peaches, apples, winter melon, daikon radish, onions, carrots, frogs, salamanders, butterflies, dragonflies, and bumblebees. The painting utilizes pigments and inks on silk with a grey scaled background. The painting is almost muted in color save for the bright oranges, yellows, and reds, and greens in the fruits and vegetables. Jakuchū's knowledge of produce from his family's grocer is evident within his scroll and the details in the said fruits and vegetables. The scroll starts with the depiction of the various fruits and vegetables in seasonal order, then moves to insects and animals with a single butterfly linking the two sides. It is speculated that Jakuchū's inspiration was from the significance of vegetables and fruits in Chinese art. The meaning of this painting may be linked to Jakuchū's link with the Buddhist faith which is also significantly present in another work of Jakuchū's, "Vegetable Parinirvana", parinirvana being defined as "nirvana-after-death, which occurs upon the death of someone who has attained nirvana during his or her lifetime". Jakuchū's portrays a Buddha's death using vegetables. The Buddha is "played" by a daikon radish surrounded by other mourning vegetables. Eggplants, turnips, and mushrooms are some of the ones included in his painting. The painting is supposed to mimic the typical traditional iconography of nirvana images which includes the eight sal trees (stalks of corn), lotus pedestal (woven basket), Queen Maya (quince fruit), and the orientation of the Buddha where his head is facing left (the daikon's leaves). Jakuchū's choice of the daikon radish as the Buddha has to do with the importance of daikon in Zen culture. Takuan Sōhō, an abbot in the Rinzai school of Zen Buddhism, was actually credited for his creation of the yellow pickled daikon radish, named after him. Historians remain unsure of the motivations behind Jakuchū's painting, but his choices in the painting prove to be meaningful and assert that the Buddha spirit is present everywhere even in vegetables. Some theorize it is to commemorate the death of his mother others say it is to commemorate the death of his brother.

=== Jakuchū gafu (Album of Jakuchū) ===
The Jakuchū gafu (若冲画譜; "Album of Jakuchū) is a series of works depicting flowers. The work is always in a circle, such as can be found on ceiling paintings. The originals were poorly preserved, but a number of quality copies of the album were made during the Meiji era of the 1890s.

From Jakuchū gafu (Album of Jakuchū)

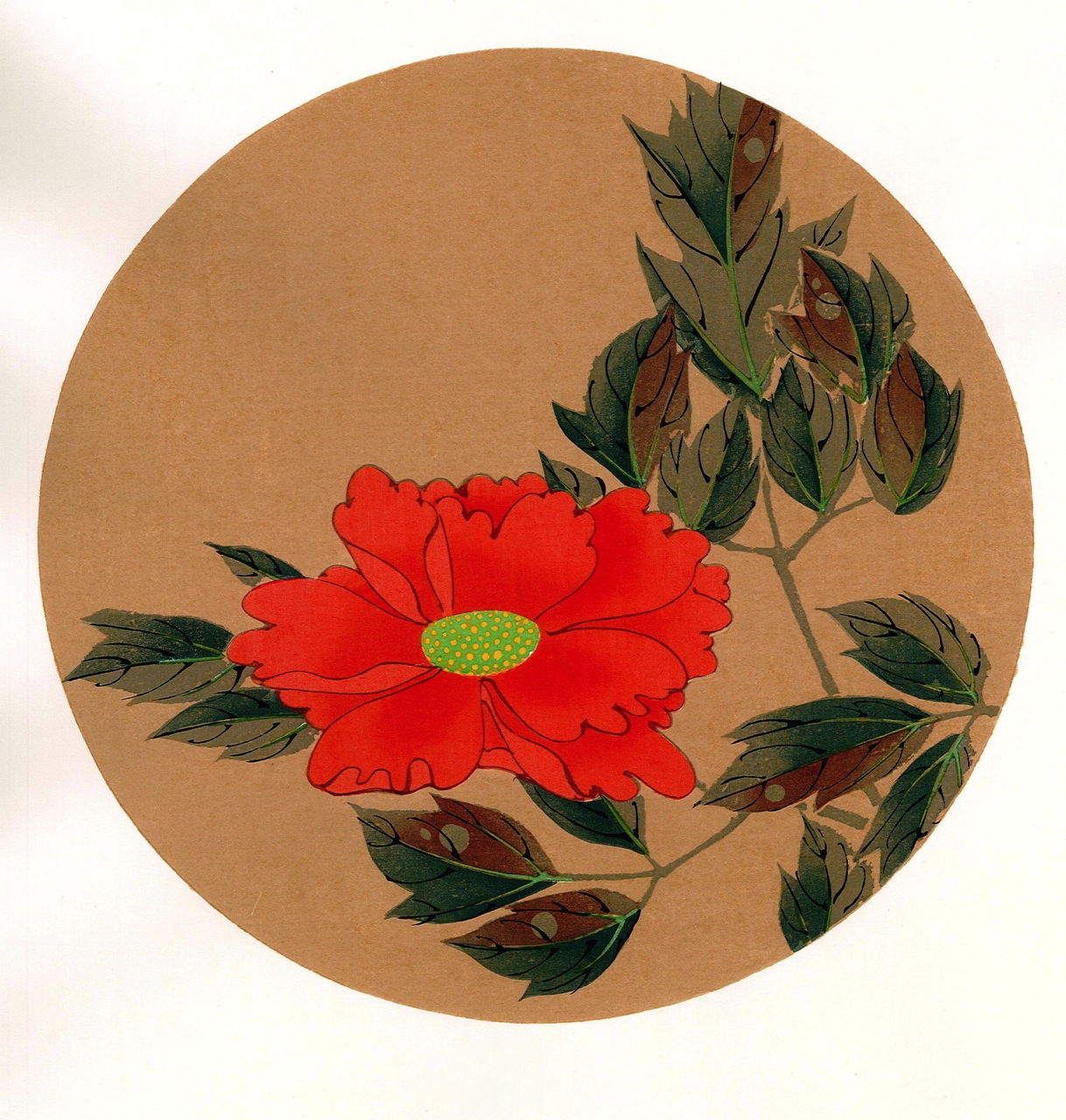

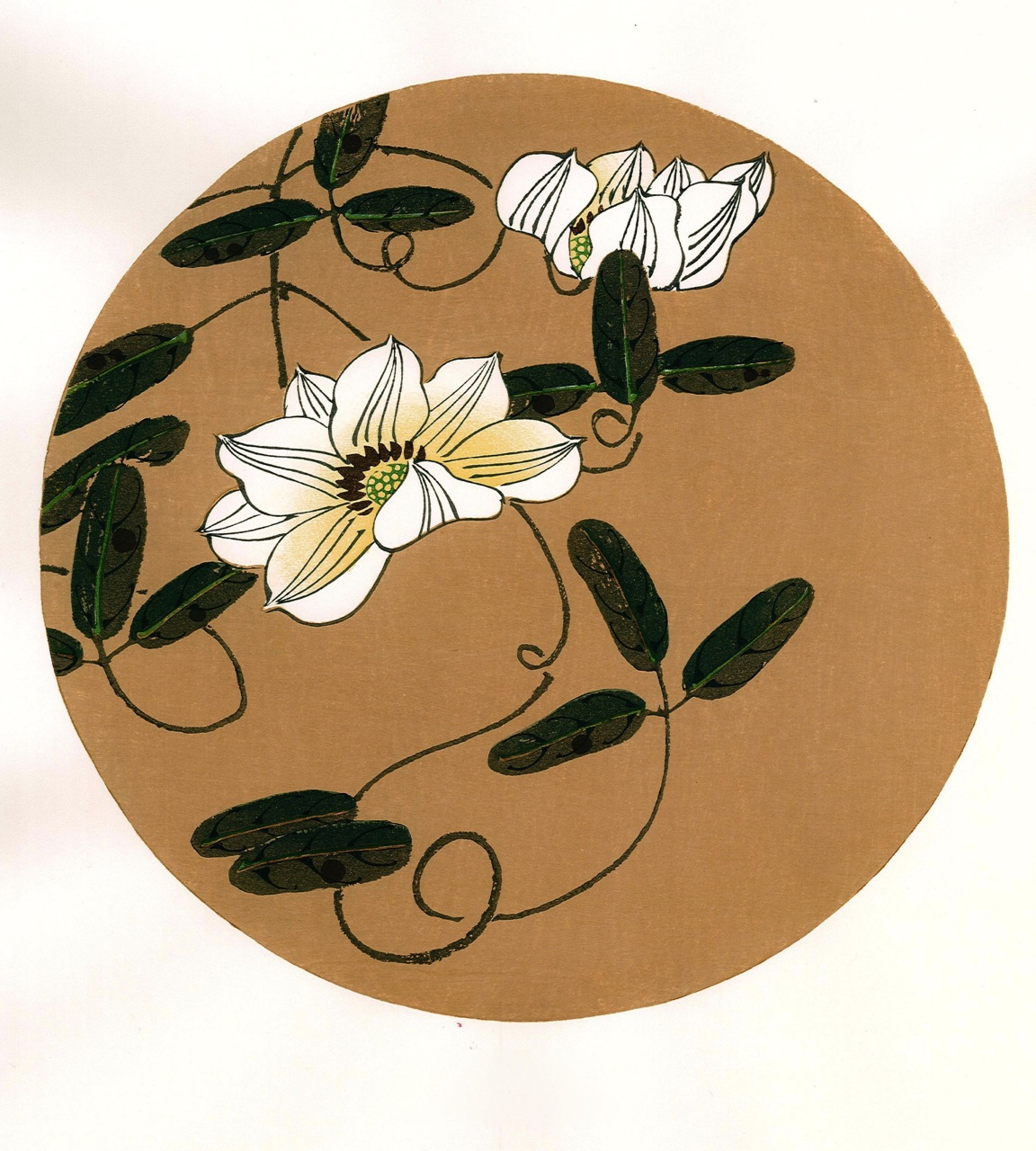

=== Jōkyōshū (Impromptu Pleasures Afloat) ===
Jakuchū can be said to have lived the life of a literary intellectual (bunjin). He was friends with many notable bunjin, went on journeys with them, and was influenced by their artistic styles. His own degree of experimentation was a result of a combination of this bunjin influence and his own personal creative drive. In addition to his experiments with Western materials and perspective, Jakuchū also employed on occasion a method called taku hanga (拓版画, "rubbing prints"). This method used woodblocks to resemble a Chinese technique of ink rubbings of inscribed stone slabs, and was employed by Jakuchū in a number of works, including a scroll entitled "Impromptu Pleasures Afloat" (乗興舟, Jōkyōshū), depicting his and his mentor, Daiten Kenjo's (大典顕常), journey down the Yodo River. The piece is currently residing in The Metropolitan Museum of Art in New York. Itō Jakuchū's scroll was created using the technique of taku-hanga which allows the background of the scroll to be black while Daiten Kenjo's texts and the artist's details are presented in greys and whites.

In the spring of 1767, both Daiten and Jakuchū decided to travel to Osaka via boat on the Yodo River, which connects Kyoto and Osaka. The 39-foot scroll, "Impromptu Pleasures Afloat" (乗興舟, Jōkyōshū), commemorates and illustrates the journey. The handscroll is the entire Yodo River from morning to night. The scroll contains short impromptu Chinese poems inscribed by Daiten inspired by the scenery seen on the journey, which mirrors how the river itself transported ideas. Daiten also includes the names of landmarks and other important areas of the Yodo River. Jakuchū seems to borrow stylistic elements and motifs from the "Eight Views of Xiaoxiang" (Chinese: 瀟湘八景; pinyin: Xiāoxiāng Bājǐng) like the evening sun, clear skies, white sails, a temple's evening bell, and finishing villages.

Jakuchū also experimented with a number of forms of printing, most of them using woodblocks. But occasionally he would use stencils or other methods to produce different effects. Jakuchū's painting style is influenced by Shen Nanping (Shen Quan c. 1682–1760). His crane subjects prove this, being part of traditional Japanese legacy, but also the neutral background and the 'cut' given to the scene composition, with always a careful and detailed flora and fauna decorative style of painting.

=== Museums ===
Today, his work is held in several museums worldwide, including the Idemitisu Museum of Arts, the University of Michigan Museum of Art, the Miho Museum, the Los Angeles County Museum of Art, the Harvard Art Museums, the Metropolitan Museum of Art, the Indianapolis Museum of Art, the Asian Art Museum, the Yale University Art Gallery, and the Minneapolis Institute of Art.

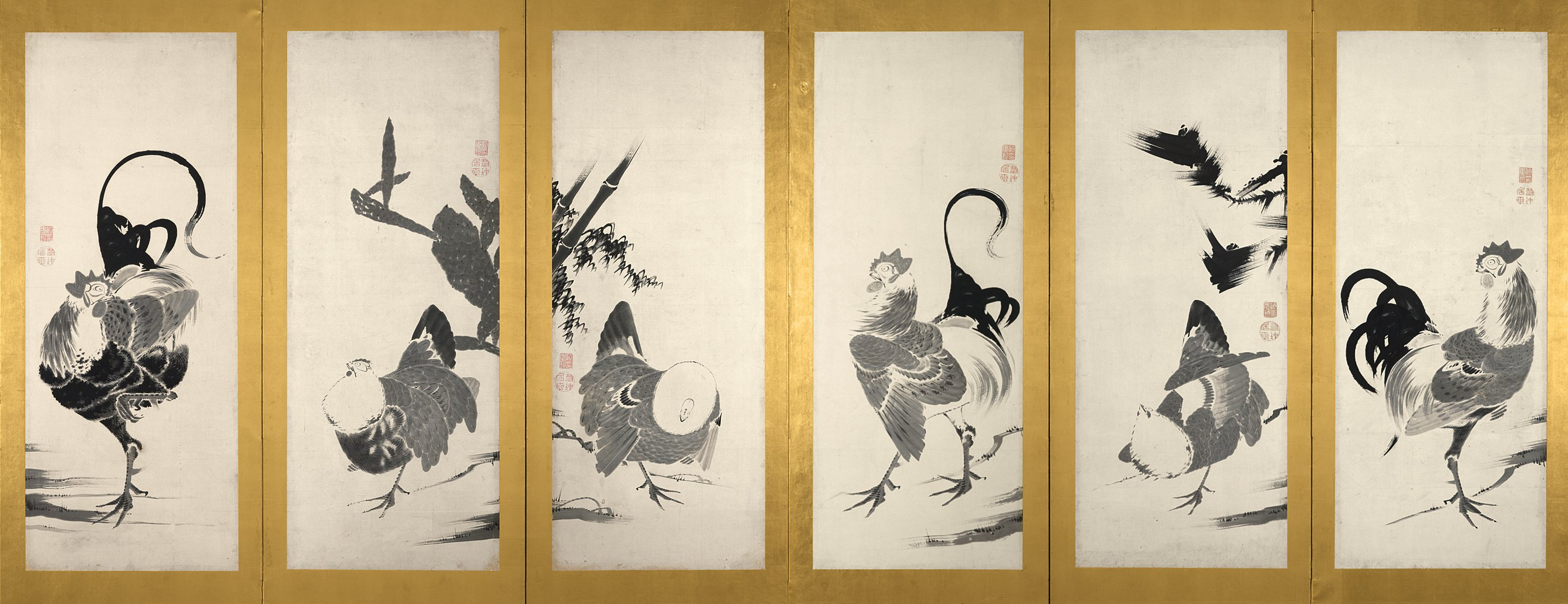
Roosters and Hens (left), Minneapolis Institute of Art

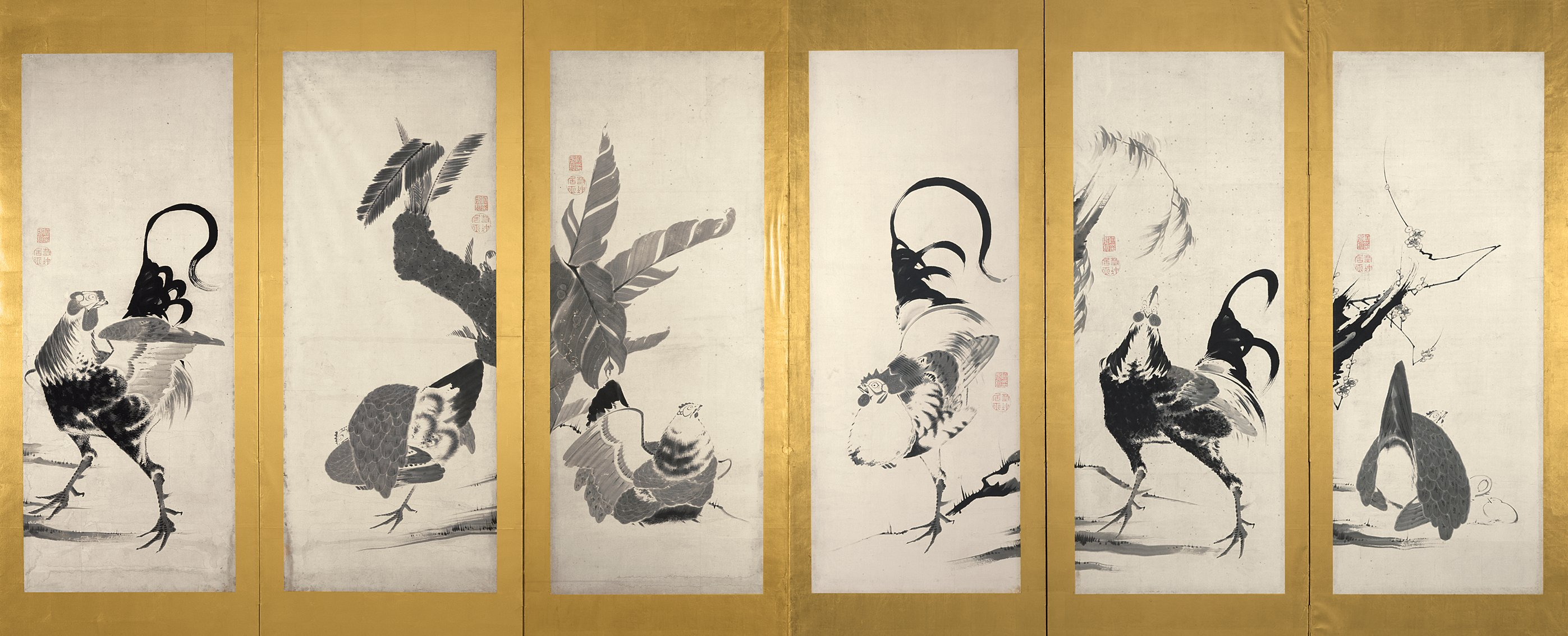
Roosters and Hens (right), Minneapolis Institute of Art

== See also ==
- Nagasawa Rosetsu
- Baisao
