= Flowering Plants of Summer and Autumn =

Painting by Sakai Hōitsu

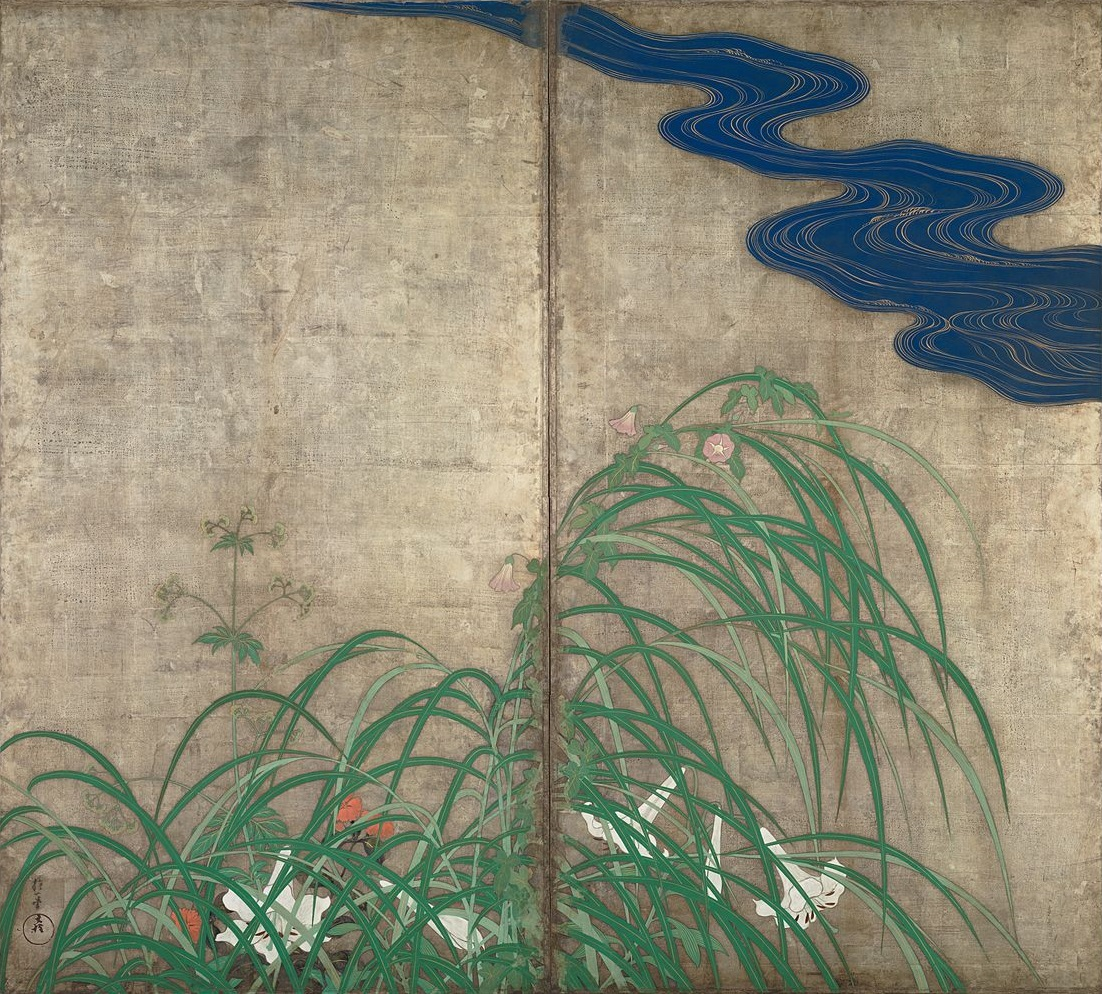
- Artist: Sakai Hōitsu
- Year: ca. 1821 (Edo period)
- Catalogue: A-11189 (TNM catalogue)
- Type: byōbu folding screens ink and color on silver and gold-foiled paper
- Dimensions: 416.6 cm × 461.8 cm (164.0 in × 181.8 in)
- Designation: Important Cultural Property
- Location: Tokyo National Museum, Tokyo, Japan

Flowering Plants of Summer and Autumn (夏秋草図屏風) is a painting on a pair of two-folded byōbu folding screens by Rinpa artist Sakai Hōitsu depicting plants and flowers from the autumn and summer seasons.

Sakai Hōitsu (1761–1828) was a celebrated Japanese painter and an important member of the Rinpa school, particularly famous for his byōbu screens and for reviving the style of Ogata Kōrin, an earlier Rinpa master.

One of his most celebrated works, Flowering Plants of Summer and Autumn consists of a pair of two-folded byōbu folding screens painted with ink and color on silver and gold-foiled paper, measuring 416.6 by 461.8 centimetres (164.0 in × 181.8 in) each. They are designated an Important Cultural Property of Japan.

Flowering Plants of Summer and Autumn was originally painted on the back of Kōrin's Wind God and Thunder God screens that belonged to Hōitsu's family. The monumental two-sided byōbu screens became a symbol of the Rinpa tradition, but both sides of the screens have since been separated to protect them from damage. In the backside of Kōrin's painting of Raijin, Hōitsu painted what has been described as "summer plants revived by a sudden shower and the swollen flow of a river", and on the backside of Kōrin's Fūjin, "autumn plants swaying and the red leaves of ivy blown in a strong wind".

The work is dated from the early 19th century, probably circa 1821, and the attribution to Hōitsu has not been disputed. Both screens include the signature-seal "by Hōitsu" and a round seal with red letters "Bunsen", another name used by Hōitsu.

Hōitsu's style, which "aimed for the natural integration of poetic emotion and decorative technique", has been linked to "the elegant and refined taste common to poetry, which is another field of art he practiced". His use of tarashikomi "to paint plants and flowers with poetic feelings" has been highly praised. This technique, in which a second layer of paint is applied before the first layer is dry, was perfected by Sōtatsu and used often by later Rinpa artists.

The screens are now part of the collection of the Tokyo National Museum, where they are exhibited occasionally. The last time they were on display was from September 21 to October 30, 2016, in Room 8 of the Honkan (Japanese Gallery). Previously they were on display at the Tokyo National Museum in 2008, 2010 and 2013.
