= Rough Waves =

Painting by Ogata Kōrin

- ja: 波濤図屏風
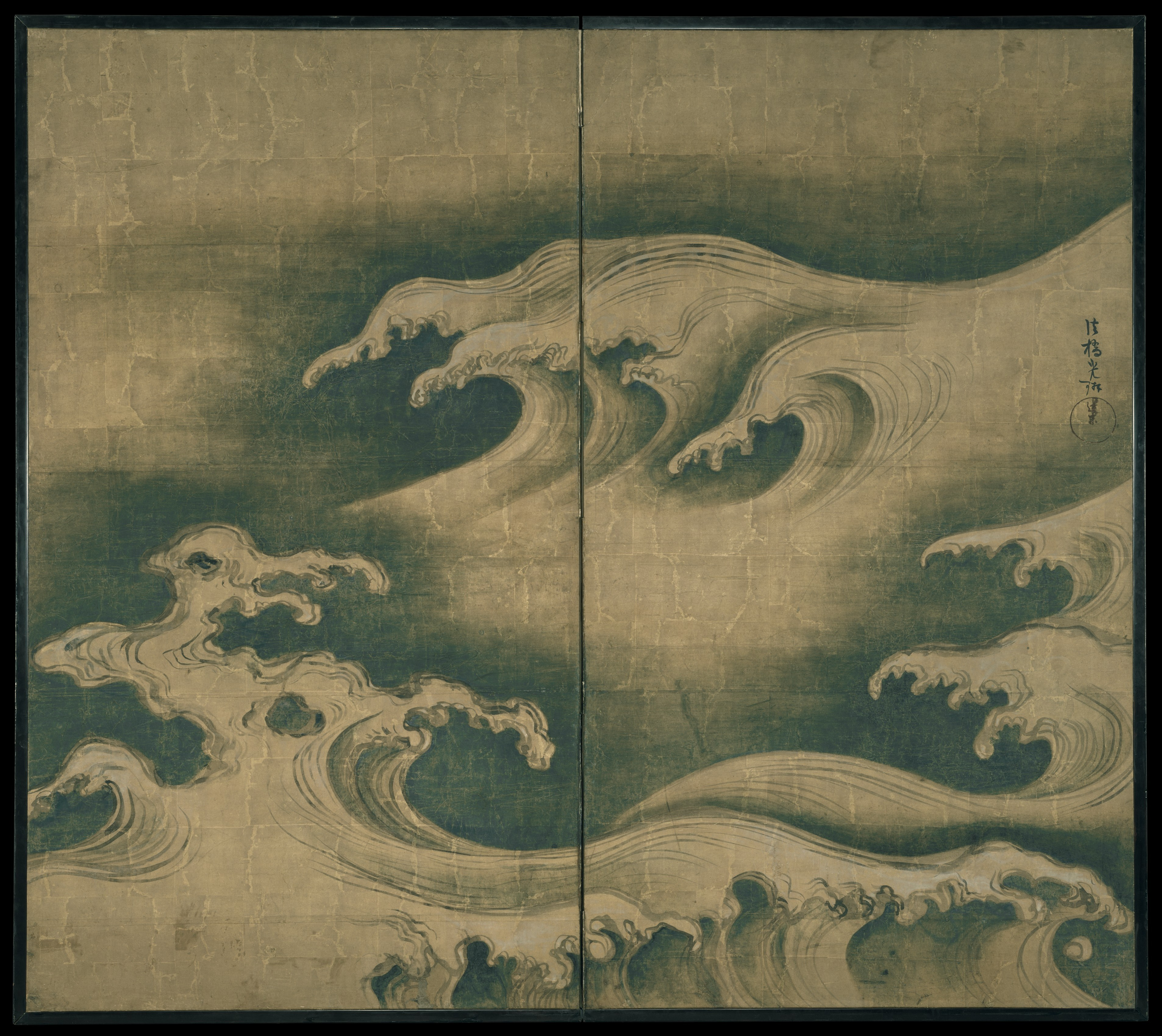
- Artist: Ogata Kōrin
- Year: c. 1704 – c. 1709
- Medium: Two-panel byōbu (folding screen); Ink and paint on gilded paper
- Dimensions: 146.5 cm × 165.4 cm (57.7 in × 65.1 in)
- Location: Metropolitan Museum of Art, New York
- Accession: 26.117

Rough Waves (Japanese: 波濤 図 屏風) is a painting by the Japanese artist Ogata Kōrin, on a two-panel byōbu (folding screen). The work was created c. 1704 – c. 1709, and depicts a swirl of stormy sea waves. It has been in the collection of the Metropolitan Museum of Art, New York, since 1926, when it was acquired with financial support from the Fletcher Fund.

== Background ==
Throughout the history of Japanese art, many artists have sought to convey in their works the fleeting state of rolling sea waves. The theme has been depicted not only on emakimono (handscrolls) and silk, but also on fans, byōbu and decor items.

== Description ==
Ogata's painting Rough Waves is the most important image of the unapproachable sea elements to be created in Japanese painting before Hokusai's The Great Wave off Kanagawa. To create it, Ogata used an ancient Chinese technique of drawing with two brushes, held together in one hand.

The materials Ogata used for the painting were ink, paint and gilded paper. He conveyed the threatening and dangerous nature of the waves with the help of elongated and contrastingly contoured, finger- or dragon-claw-like wave crests and sea foam. The expressiveness of the work appears to be unusual for Ogata, with the main means of expression being the use of lines created by ink.

The screen on which Rough Waves was painted bears the seal “Dōsū”, a pseudonym that Ogata used from 1704. Recent studies show that Ogata created the painting between 1704 and 1709, during the transitional period in his career when he lived in the city of Edo (now Tokyo). The works of the artist during this period are characterized by a strong influence of the creativity of representatives of the Kanō school.

The direct source of inspiration for Rough Waves may have been the work of the artist Sesson Shukei (c. 1504 – c. 1589), whose still-extant paintings include a number of dynamic and mysterious images of sea waves, among them Egret, Moon, and Wave and The Wind and the Waves. Rough Waves also reflects the influence of Tawaraya Sōtatsu, who specialized in gloomy landscapes, but is nevertheless an independent interpretation by Ogata of the frightening and violent force of the sea.

== Influence ==
Rough Waves impressed Ogata’s follower Sakai Hōitsu, who in 1805 created his work Waves, in which he tried to convey a similar frightening atmosphere and a premonition of danger. At some time in the past, Hōitsu's family had commissioned work from Ogata, and so a collection of Ogata's pictures was available for Hōitsu to study in detail. The images in Waves, created in ink on silver-plated paper, were more abstract than those in Ogata's work, but retained their demonic character.
