= Wind God and Thunder God (Kōrin) =

Paintings by Ogata Kōrin

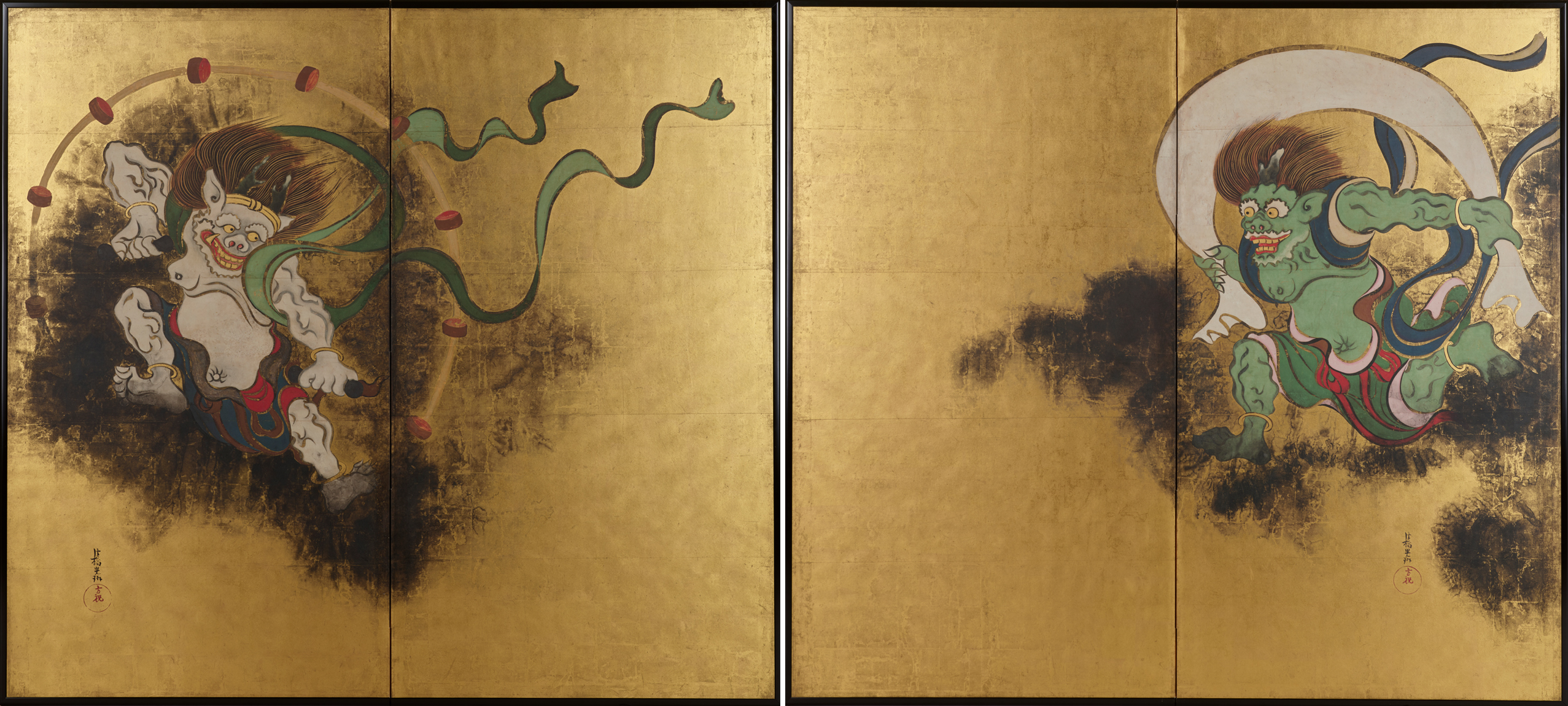
- Artist: Ogata Kōrin
- Year: early 18th century (Edo period)
- Catalogue: A-11189-1 (TNM catalogue)
- Type: byōbu folding screens ink and color on gold-foiled paper
- Dimensions: 421.6 cm × 464.8 cm (166.0 in × 183.0 in)
- Designation: Important Cultural Property
- Location: Tokyo National Museum, Tokyo, Japan

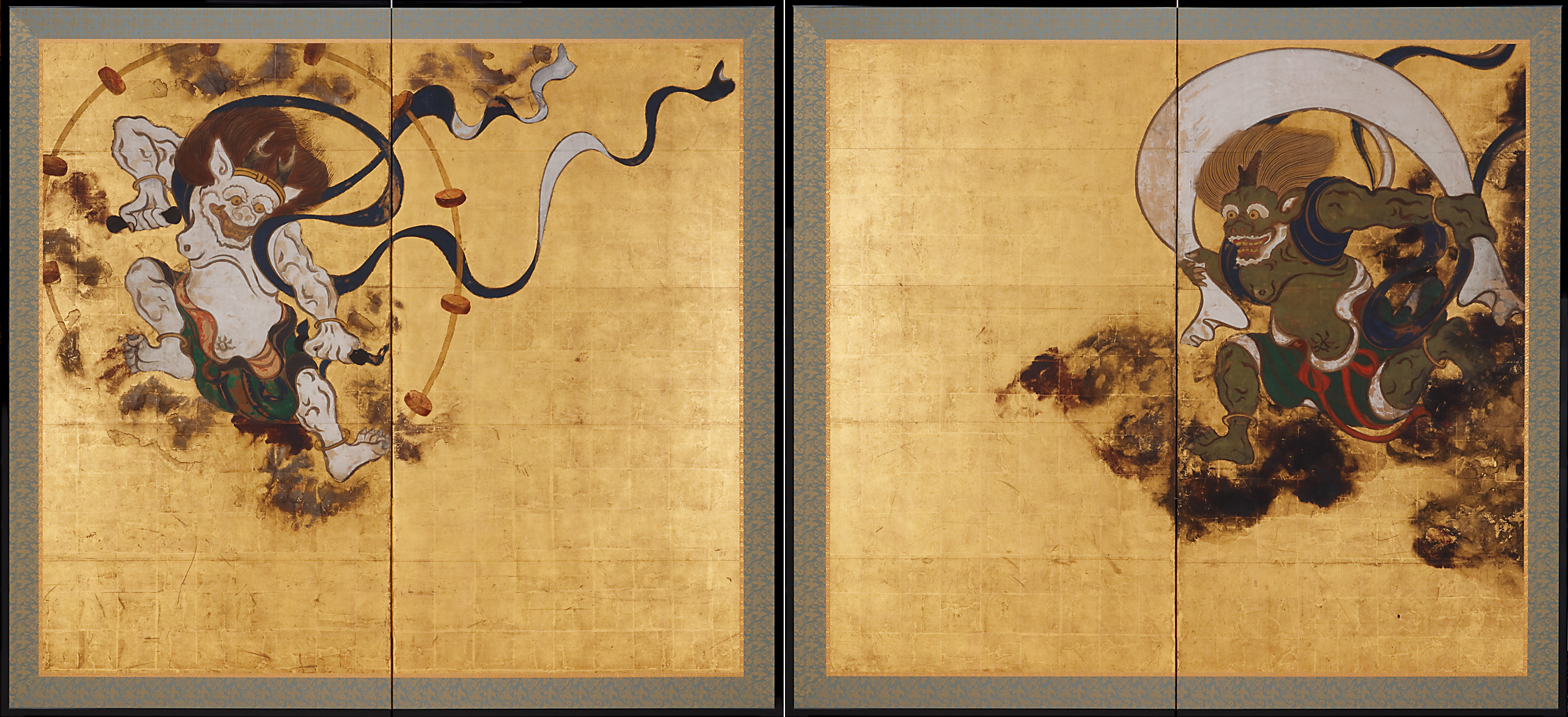
Tawaraya Sōtatsu’s original. 17th century

Wind God and Thunder God (紙本金地著色風神雷神図, Shihon Kinji Chakushoku Fūjin Raijin-zu) is a painting on a pair of two-folded byōbu (folding screens) by Rinpa artist Ogata Kōrin, a replica of a similar work by Tawaraya Sōtatsu, depicting Raijin, the god of lightning, thunder and storms in the Shinto religion and in Japanese mythology, and Fūjin, the god of wind.

Ogata Kōrin (1658–1716) was a major Japanese painter, lacquerer and designer, and an important member of the Rinpa school, particularly famous for his byōbu screens, his paintings on ceramics and lacquerware produced by his brother Ogata Kenzan, and for consolidating the style of the founding Rinpa master, Kōetsu and Sōtatsu.

One of his most important works (although not as famous as his Irises and Red and White Plum Blossoms screens), Wind God and Thunder God consists of a pair of two-folded byōbu folding screens painted with ink and color on gold-foiled paper, measuring 421.6 by 464.8 centimetres (166.0 in × 183.0 in) each. The work dates from the early 18th century: probably circa 1700, as it is not generally considered one of Kōrin's later works, and he died in 1716. The attribution to Kōrin has not been disputed. It is designated an Important Cultural Property of Japan.

At some point Sakai Hōitsu owned the painting, and in fact he painted one of his most famous works, Flowering Plants of Summer and Autumn, on the back of these screens. The monumental two-sided byōbu screens became a symbol of the Rinpa tradition, but both sides of the screens have since been separated to protect them from damage.

Kōrin's painting is a close replica of an original by Tawaraya Sōtatsu, dated from the 17th century, and designated a National Treasure. In turn, Hōitsu painted a version in the 19th century. All three versions of the work were displayed together for the first time in seventy-five years in 2015, at the Kyoto National Museum exhibition "Rinpa: The Aesthetics of the Capital". An even later version of the work was created by the late Rinpa artist Suzuki Kiitsu, a student of Hōitsu.

The screens are now part of the collection of the Tokyo National Museum, where they are exhibited occasionally. The last time they were on display was from May 30 to July 2, 2017, in Room 7 of the Honkan (Japanese Gallery). Previously they were on display at the Tokyo National Museum in 2008, 2012, 2013, and 2014.
