= Ogata Kōrin =

Japanese visual artist (1658–1716)

- 尾形 光琳
- Born: 1658; Kyoto, Tokugawa shogunate
- Died: June 2, 1716 (aged 57–58); Kyoto, Tokugawa shogunate
- Known for: Painting; Lacquerware; Textile design
- Notable work: Irises (National Treasure); Red and White Plum Blossoms (National Treasure); Wind God and Thunder God (Important Cultural Property); Writing Box with Eight Bridges (National Treasure)
- Movement: Rinpa school

Ogata Kōrin (Japanese: 尾形光琳; 1658 – June 2, 1716) was a Japanese landscape illustrator, lacquerer, painter, and textile designer of the Rinpa School.

Kōrin is best known for his byōbu folding screens, such as Irises and Red and White Plum Blossoms (both registered National Treasures), and his paintings on ceramics and lacquerware produced by his brother Kenzan (1663–1743). Also a prolific designer, he worked with a variety of decorative and practical objects, such as round fans, writing boxes (suzuribako) executed in relief (makie) or inrō (medicine cases).

He is also credited with reviving and consolidating the Rinpa school of Japanese painting, fifty years after its foundation by Hon'ami Kōetsu (1558–1637) and Tawaraya Sōtatsu (c. 1570 – c. 1640). In fact the term "Rinpa", coined in the Meiji period, means "school of [Kō]rin". In particular he had a lasting influence on Sakai Hōitsu (1761–1828), who replicated many of his paintings and popularized his work, organizing the first exhibition of Kōrin's paintings at the hundredth anniversary of his death.

== Biography ==
Kōrin was born in Kyoto into a wealthy merchant family, dedicated to the design and sale of fine textiles. The family business, named Karigane-ya, catered to the aristocratic women of the city. His father, Ogata Sōken (1621–1687), who was a noted calligrapher in the style of Kōetsu and patron of Noh theater, introduced his sons to the arts. Kōrin was the second son of Sōken. His younger brother Kenzan was a celebrated potter and painter in his own right, with whom he collaborated frequently. As the offspring of a wealthy urban family, Kōrin received an education typical of men of his social stature, which included instruction in painting and calligraphy. However, he was reportedly more interested in the theater than in painting during his youth. He most likely received painting lessons from a member of the Kanō school, though attempts to determine the specific teacher have been inconclusive. The most significant influences on his mature painting style were his great-granduncle Hon'ami Kōetsu and the painter Tawaraya Sōtatsu.

Sōken died in 1687, and the elder brother took over the family business, leaving Kōrin and Kenzan free to enjoy a considerable inheritance. After this, Kōrin led a very active social life, but his spending ran him into financial difficulties the following years, partly due to loans made to feudal lords. This forced him to pawn some of his treasured possessions. A letter sent by him to a pawnbroker in 1694 regarding "one writing box with deer by Kōetsu" and "one Shigaraki ware water jar with lacquer lid" survives.

Kōrin established himself as an artist only late in life. In 1701, he was awarded the honorific title of hokkyō ("Bridge of the Dharma"), the third highest rank awarded to Buddhist artists, and in 1704 he moved to Edo, where lucrative commissions were more readily available. His early masterpieces, such as his Irises are generally dated to this period. During this time, he also had the opportunity to study the ink paintings of medieval monk painters Sesshū Tōyō (1420–1506) and Sesson Shukei (c. 1504 – c. 1589). These are seen as important influences in his work from that period, the Rough Waves painting for example.

In 1709, he moved back to Kyoto. He built a house with an atelier on Shinmachi street in 1712 and lived there the last five years of his life. His masterpieces from that last period, such as the Red and White Plum Blossoms screens, are thought to have been painted there.

Kōrin died famous but impoverished on June 2, 1716, at the age of 59. His grave is located at the Myōken-ji temple in Kyoto. His chief pupils were Tatebayashi Kagei, Watanabe Shikō and Fukae Rōshu, but the present knowledge and appreciation of his work are largely due to the early efforts of his brother Kenzan and later Sakai Hōitsu, who brought about a revival of Kōrin's style.

== Works ==
Irises (紙本金地著色燕子花図) is a pair of six-panel byōbu folding screens made circa 1701–1705, using ink and color on gold-foiled paper. The screens are among the first works of Kōrin as a hokkyō. It depicts abstracted blue Japanese irises in bloom, and their green foliage, creating a rhythmically repeating but varying pattern across the panels. The similarities of some blooms indicate that a stencil was used. The work shows influence of Tawaraya, and it is representative of the Rinpa school. It is inspired by an episode in the Heian-period text The Tales of Ise.

Irises

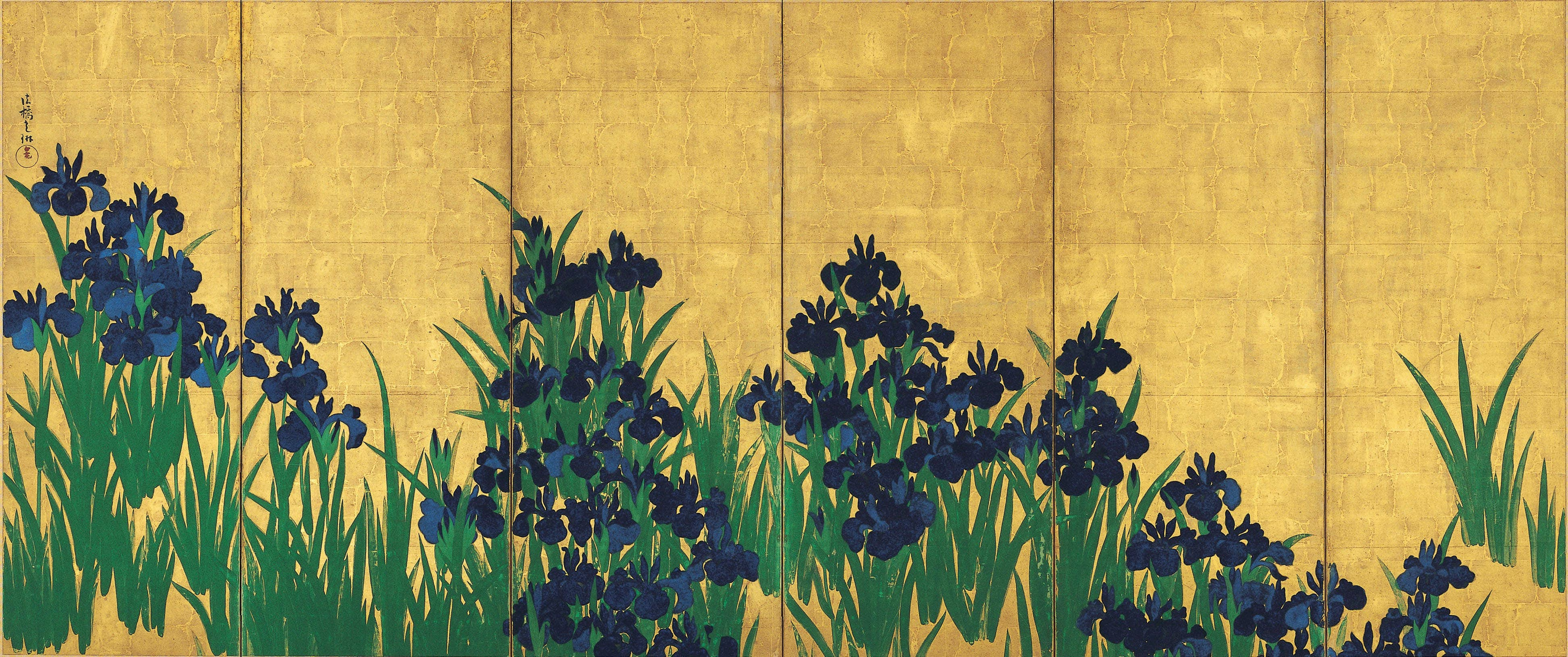

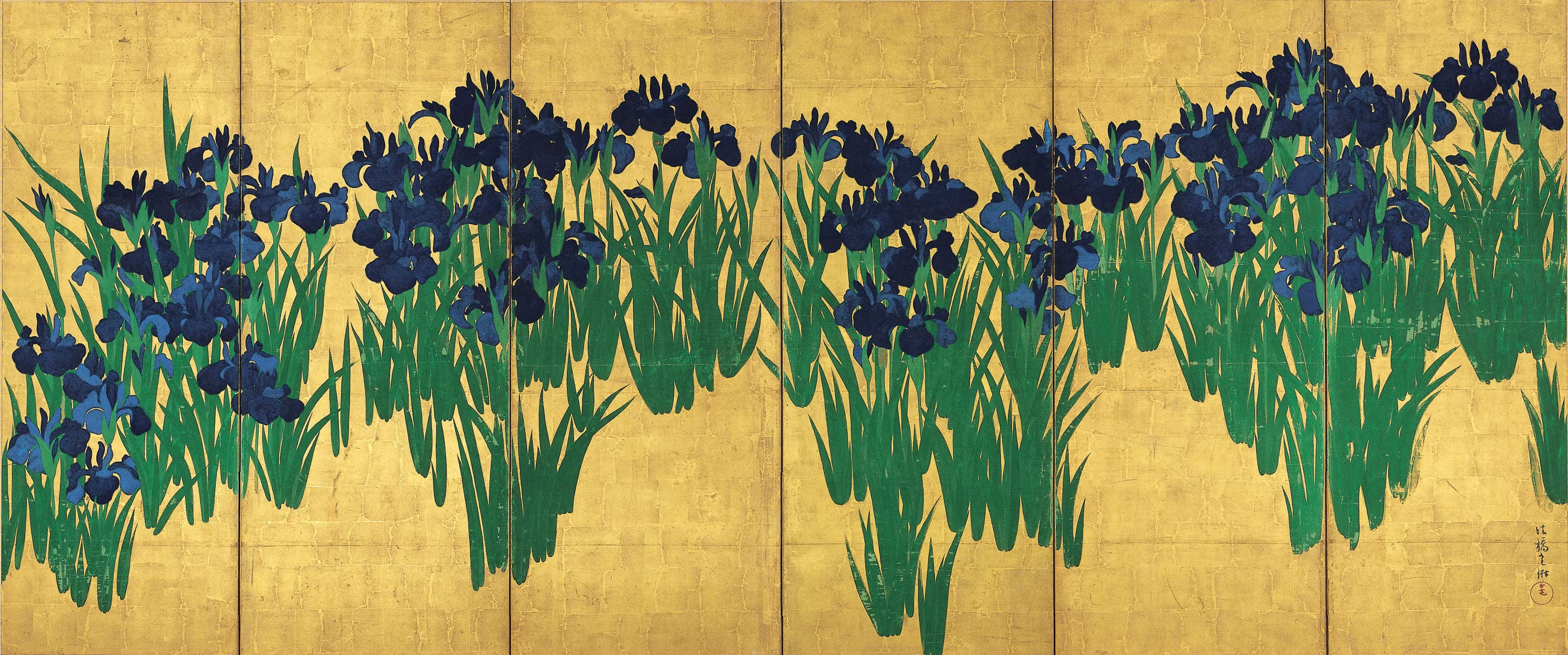

Each screen measures 150.9 by 338.8 centimetres (59.4 in × 133.4 in). They were probably made for the Nijō family, and were presented to the Nishi Honganji Buddhist temple in Kyoto, where they were held for over 200 years. They were sold by the temple in 1913, and are now held by the Nezu Museum, where they are exhibited occasionally (last time, from April 12 to May 14, 2017). They are listed as a National Treasure of Japan.

Kōrin made a similar work about five to twelve years later, another pair of six-panel screens, known as Irises at Yatsuhashi (八橋図屏風). It is a more explicit reference to the "Yatsuhashi (Eight Bridges)" episode from The Tales of Ise, including the depiction of an angular bridge that sweeps diagonally across both screens.

Irises at Yatsuhashi
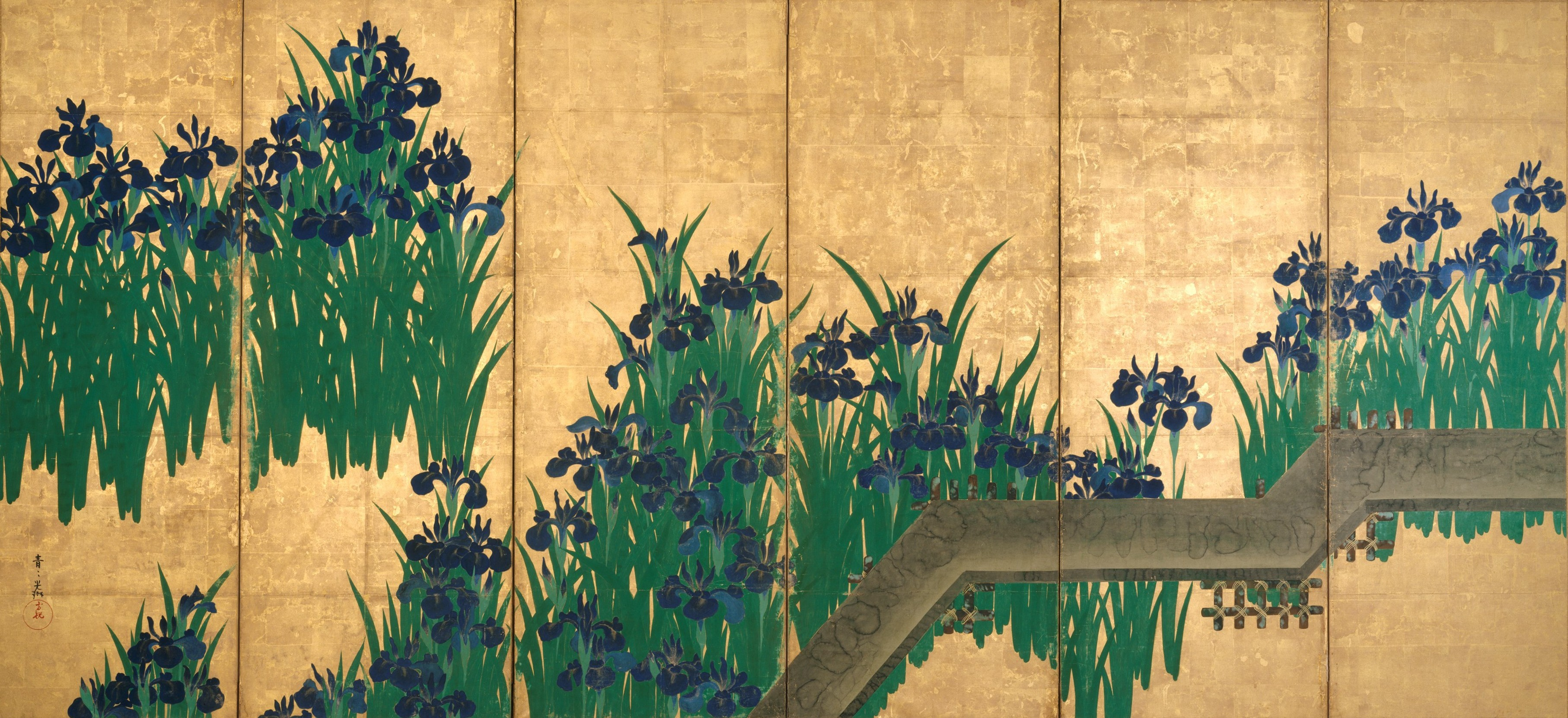
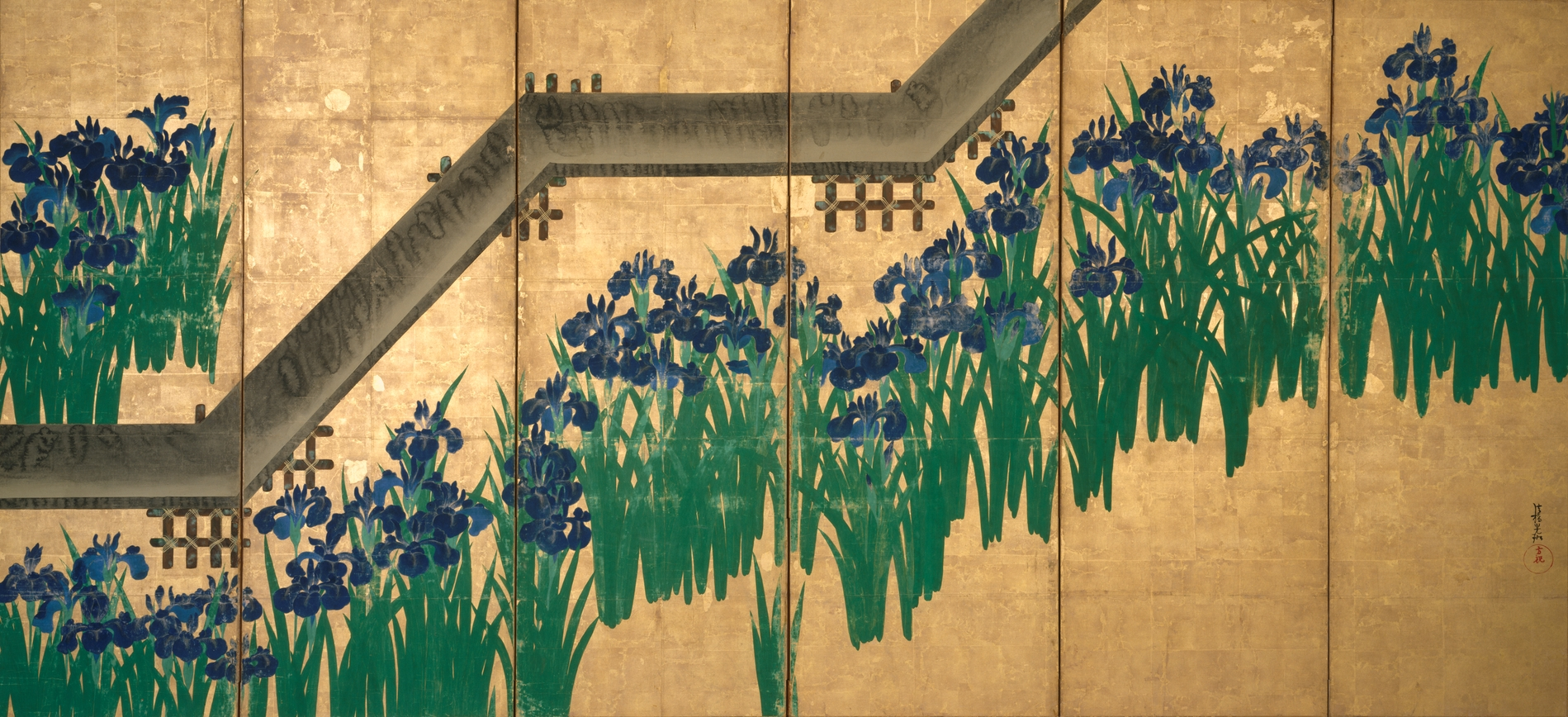

The screens were made using ink and color on gold-foiled paper and measure 163.7 by 352.4 centimetres (64.4 in × 138.7 in) each. They have been held by the Metropolitan Museum of Art in New York City since 1953, and were last displayed in 2013.

Both Irises screens were displayed together for the first time in almost a century in 2012 at the "Korin: National Treasure Irises of the Nezu Museum and Eight-Bridge of the Metropolitan Museum of Art" exhibition at the Nezu Museum.

Wind God and Thunder God (紙本金地著色風神雷神図) is a pair of two-folded screens made using ink and color on gold-foiled paper. It is a replica of an original work by Tawaraya which depicts Raijin, the god of lightning, thunder and storms in the Shinto religion and in Japanese mythology, and Fūjin, the god of wind. Later, Sakai Hōitsu, another prominent member of the Rinpa school, painted his own version of the work. All three versions of the work were displayed together for the first time in seventy-five years in 2015, at the Kyoto National Museum exhibition Rinpa: The Aesthetics of the Capital.

Wind God and Thunder God

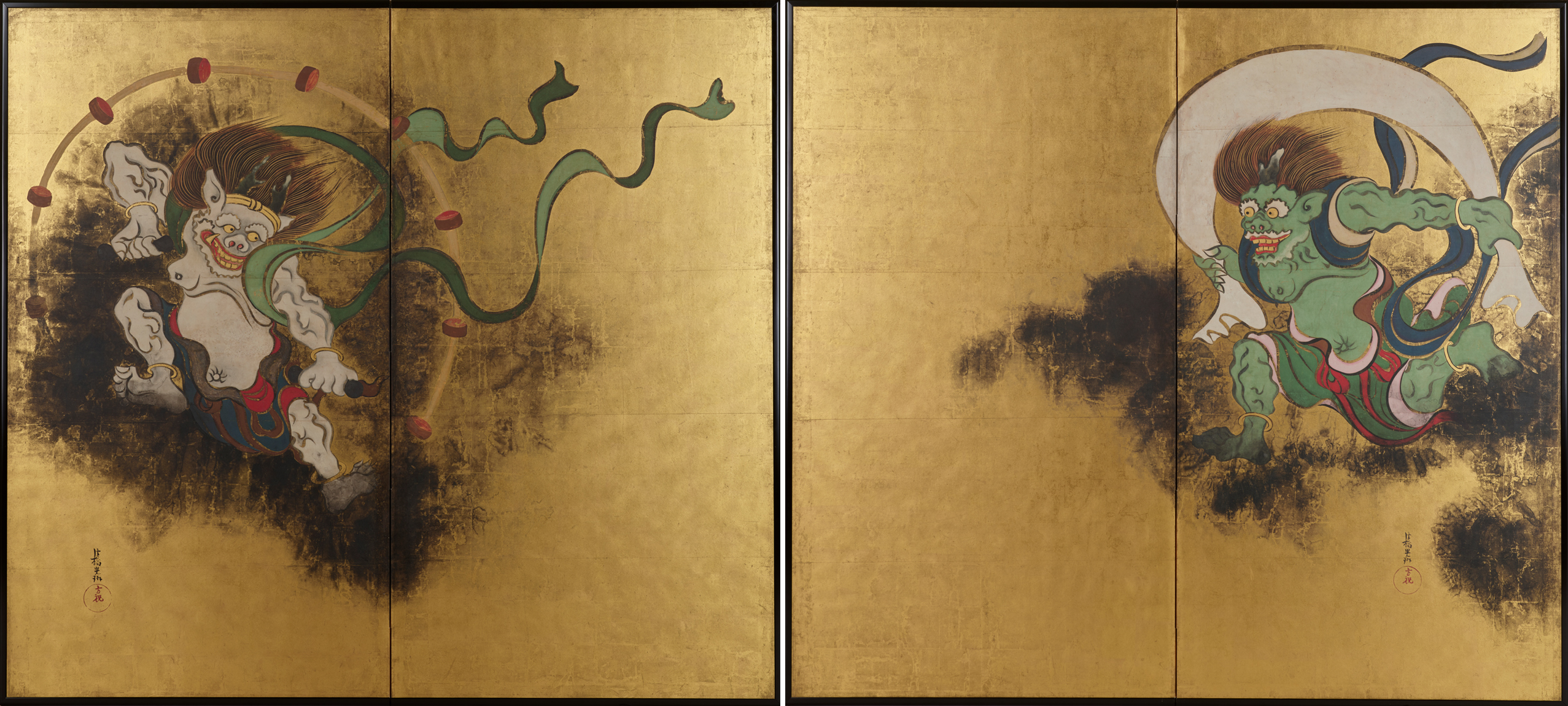
Kōrin's version

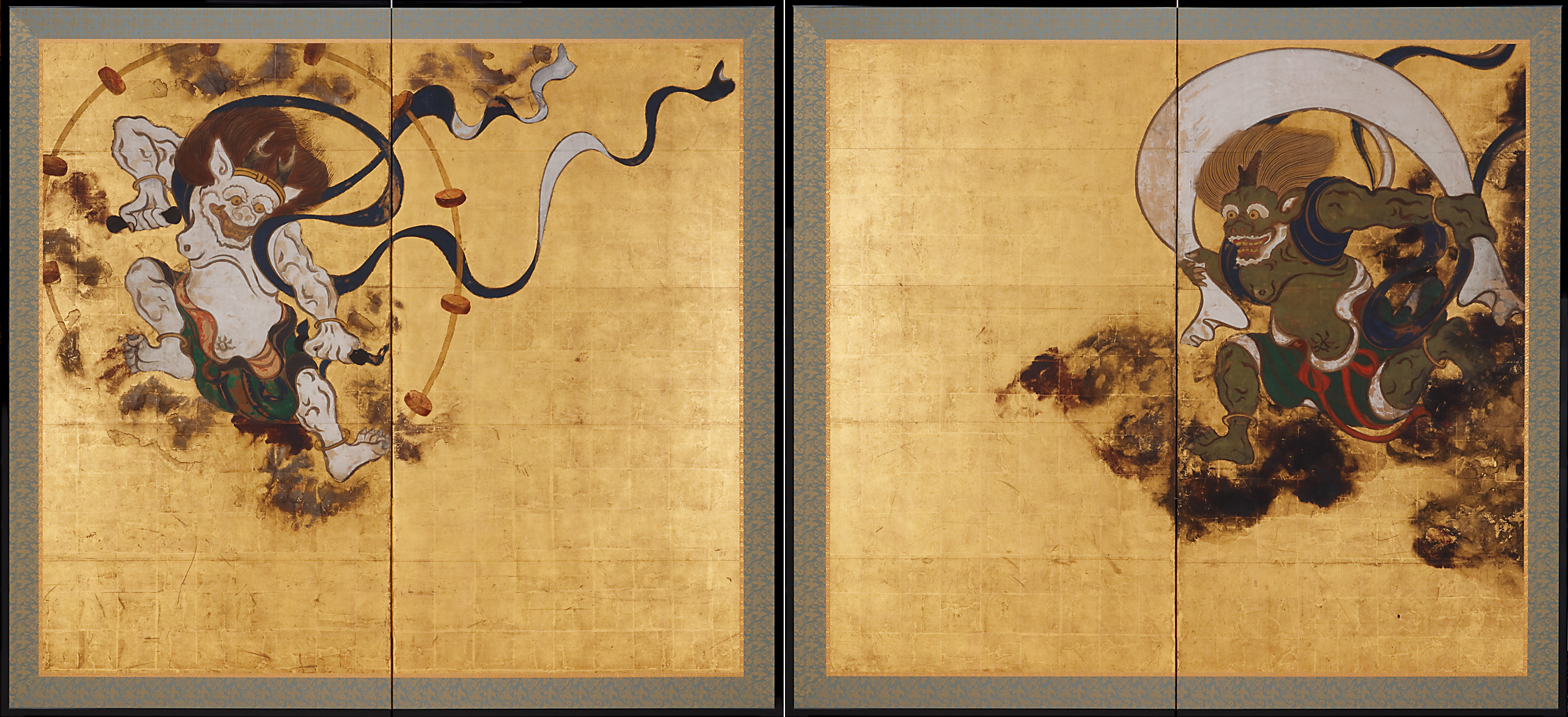
Sōtatsu's original

The screens measure 421.6 by 464.8 centimetres (166 in × 183 in) each. At some point Hōitsu owned them, and in fact he painted one of his most famous works, Flowering Plants of Summer and Autumn, in the back of these screens. The monumental two-sided byōbu screens became a symbol of the Rinpa tradition, but both sides of the screens have since been separated to protect them from damage. They are now part of the collection of the Tokyo National Museum, where they are exhibited occasionally. They are listed as an Important Cultural Property.

Red and White Plum Blossoms (紙本金地著色紅白梅図) is a pair of two-panel byōbu folding screens painted by Kōrin using ink and color on gold-foiled paper. A late masterpiece, completed probably circa 1712–1716 in his atelier in Kyoto, it is considered his crowning achievement. The simple, stylized composition of the work depicts a patterned flowing river with a white plum tree on the left and a red plum tree on the right. The plum blossoms indicate the scene occurs in spring.

No documentation exists from before the 20th century on the commission or provenance of the screens. They receive mention in no Edo-period publications on Kōrin's works and were not copied by his followers, which suggests they were not well known. A journal article in 1907 (Note: 「尾形光琳筆 梅花図屏風に就て」 "Ogata Kōrin hitsu Baika Zu Byōbu ni tsuite", in Kokka (『國華』), issue 201, p. 569 (1907)) is the first known publication about them, and their first public display came in a 200th-anniversary exhibition of Kōrin's work in 1915.

In addition to the use of tarashikomi, the work is notable for its plum flowers depicted using pigment only, without any outline, now a popular technique known as Kōrin Plum Flowers.

Red and White Plum Blossoms

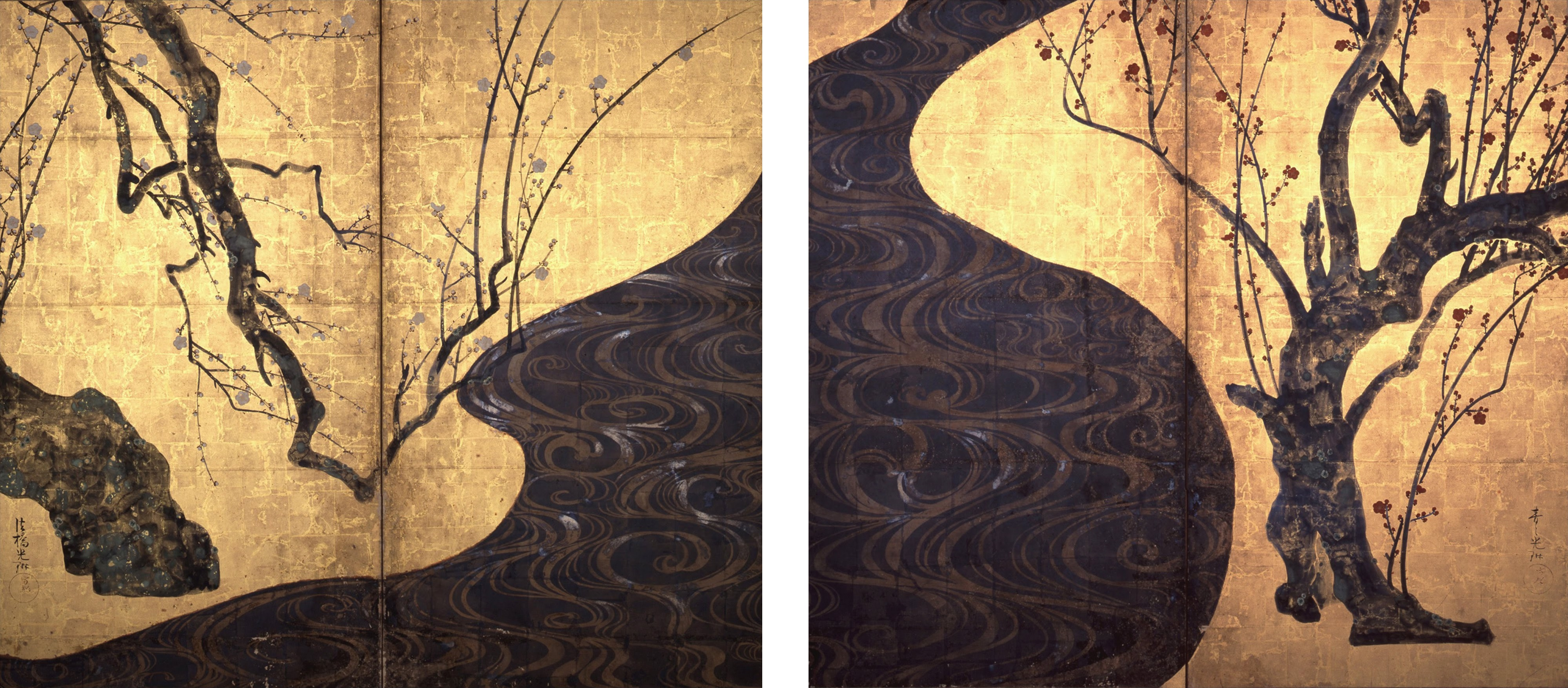

Each screen measures 156.5 × 172.5 centimetres (61.6 × 67.9 in). Red and White Plum Blossoms belonged for a long time to the Tsugaru clan, but were purchased by Mokichi Okada in the mid-1950s. Along with the rest of Okada's collection, it is now owned by the MOA Museum of Art in Atami, where they are displayed for one month per year in late winter, the season when the plum blossoms bloom. It is listed as a National Treasure of Japan.

Sometime in the early 18th century, Kōrin painted a notable copy of Tawaraya Sōtatsu's work, Waves at Matsushima.

== Gallery ==
Byōbu folding screens
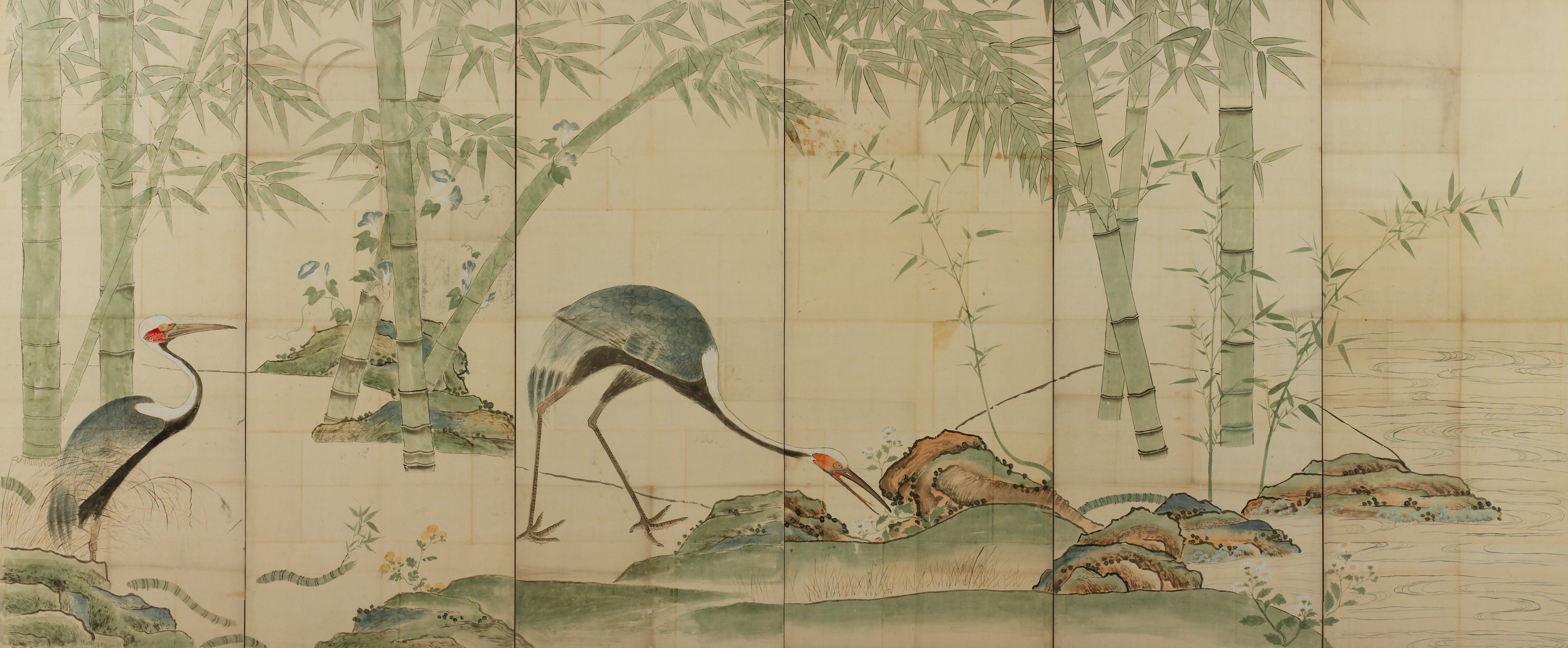
Cranes, Pines, and Bamboo

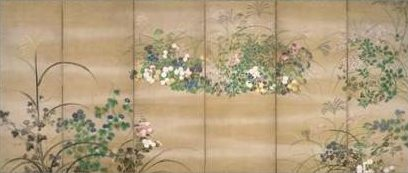
Autumn Grasses

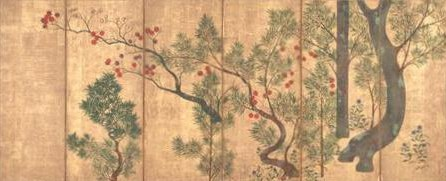
Black Pines and Maple Tree (Important Cultural Property)

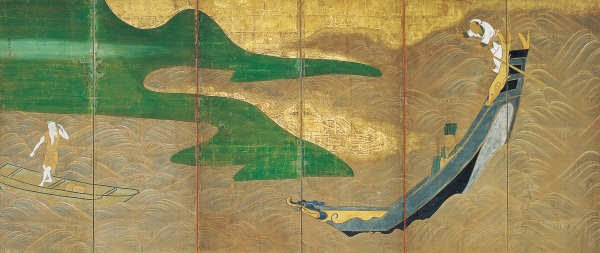
The Poet Bo Juyi

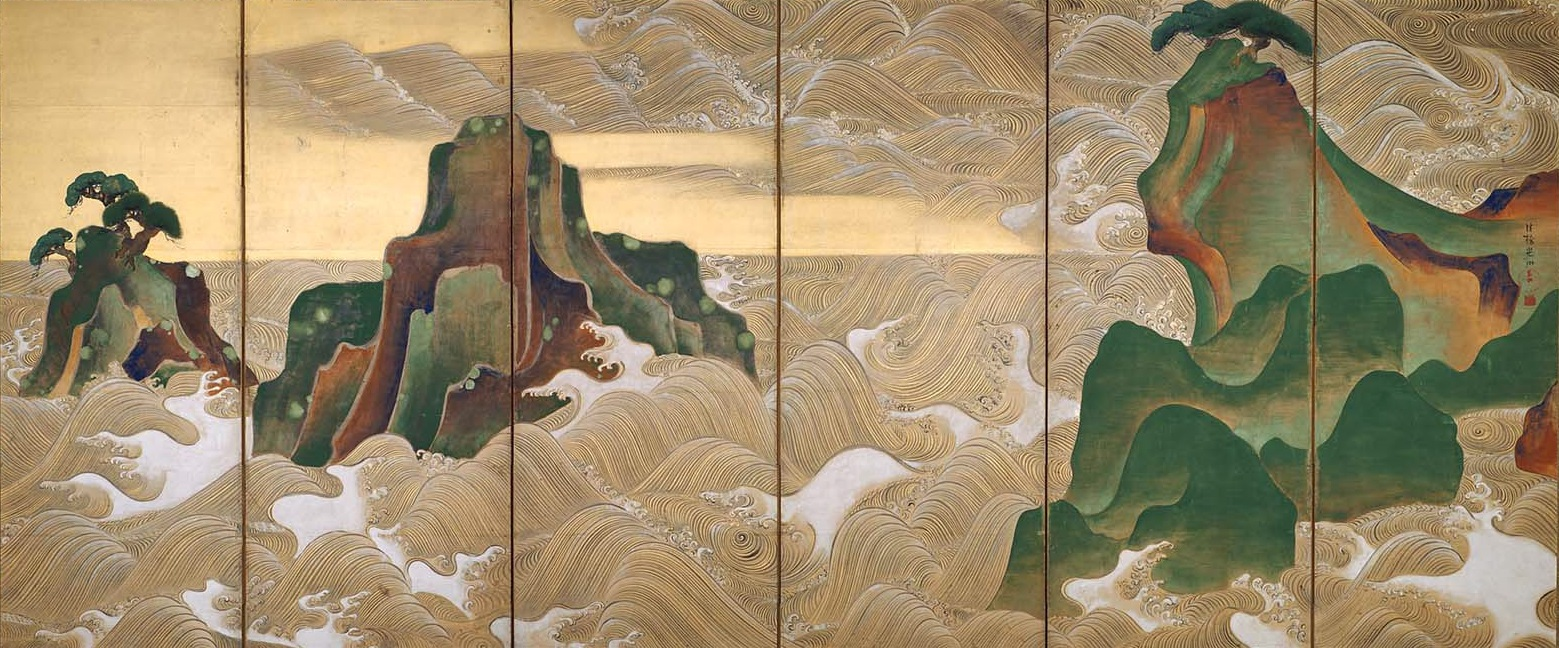
Waves at Matsushima

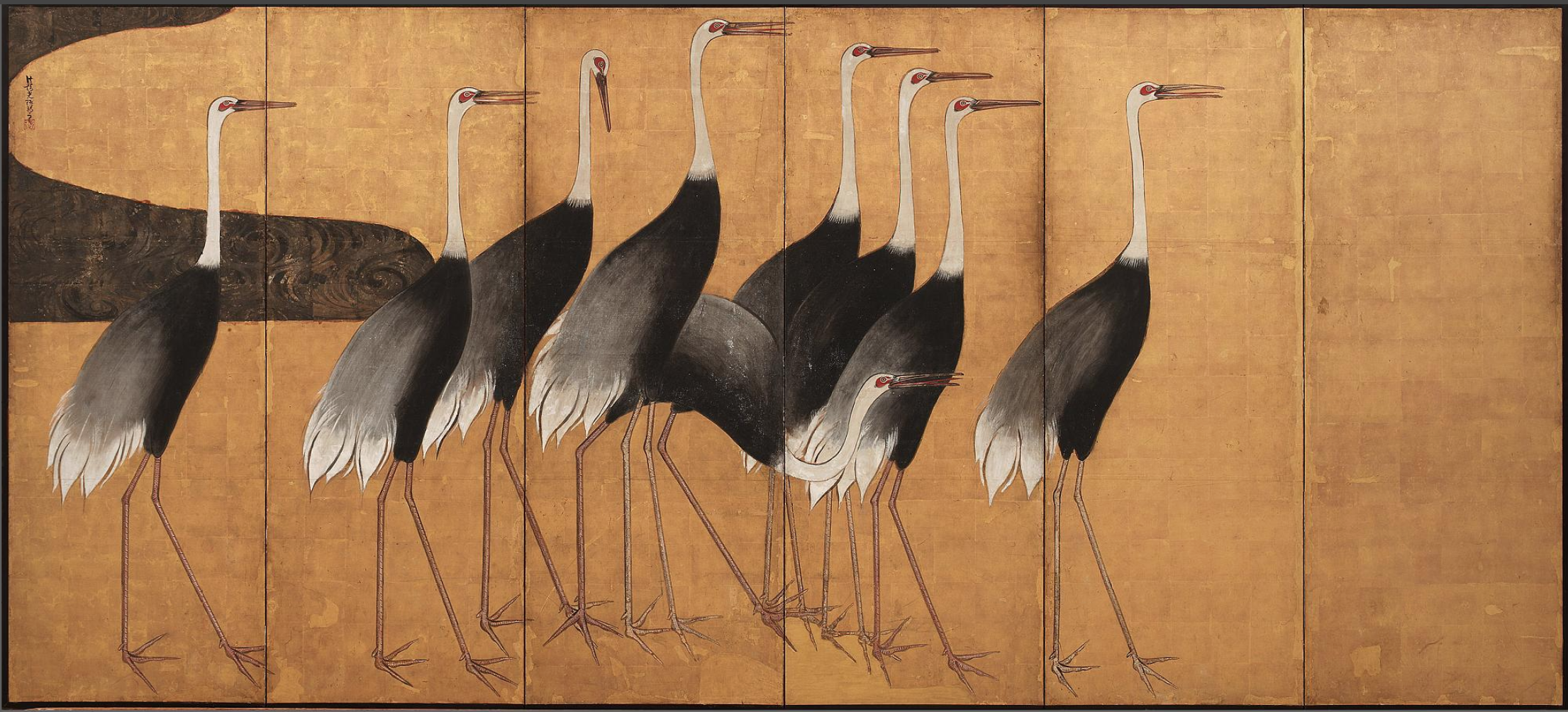
Cranes
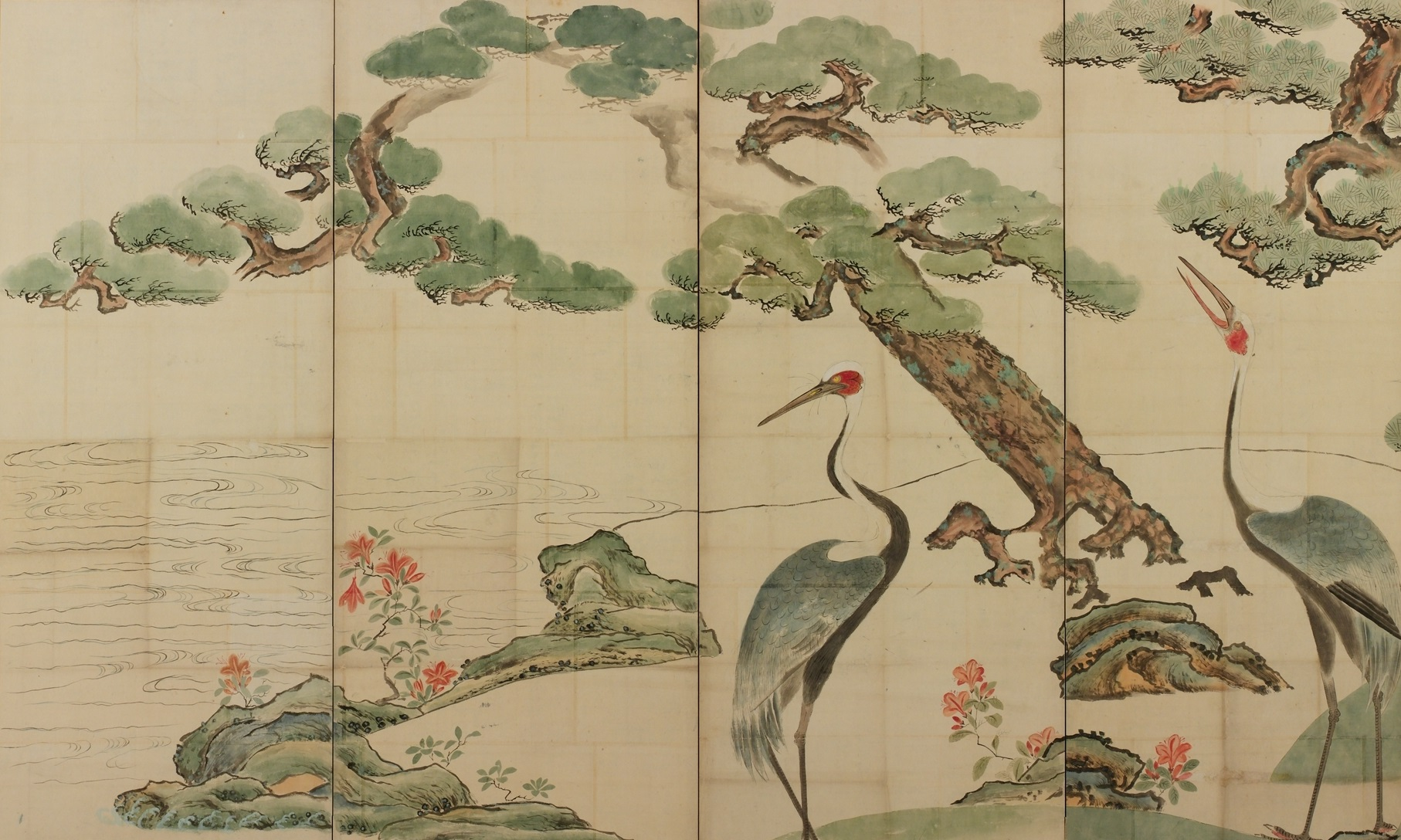
Cranes, Pines, and Bamboo

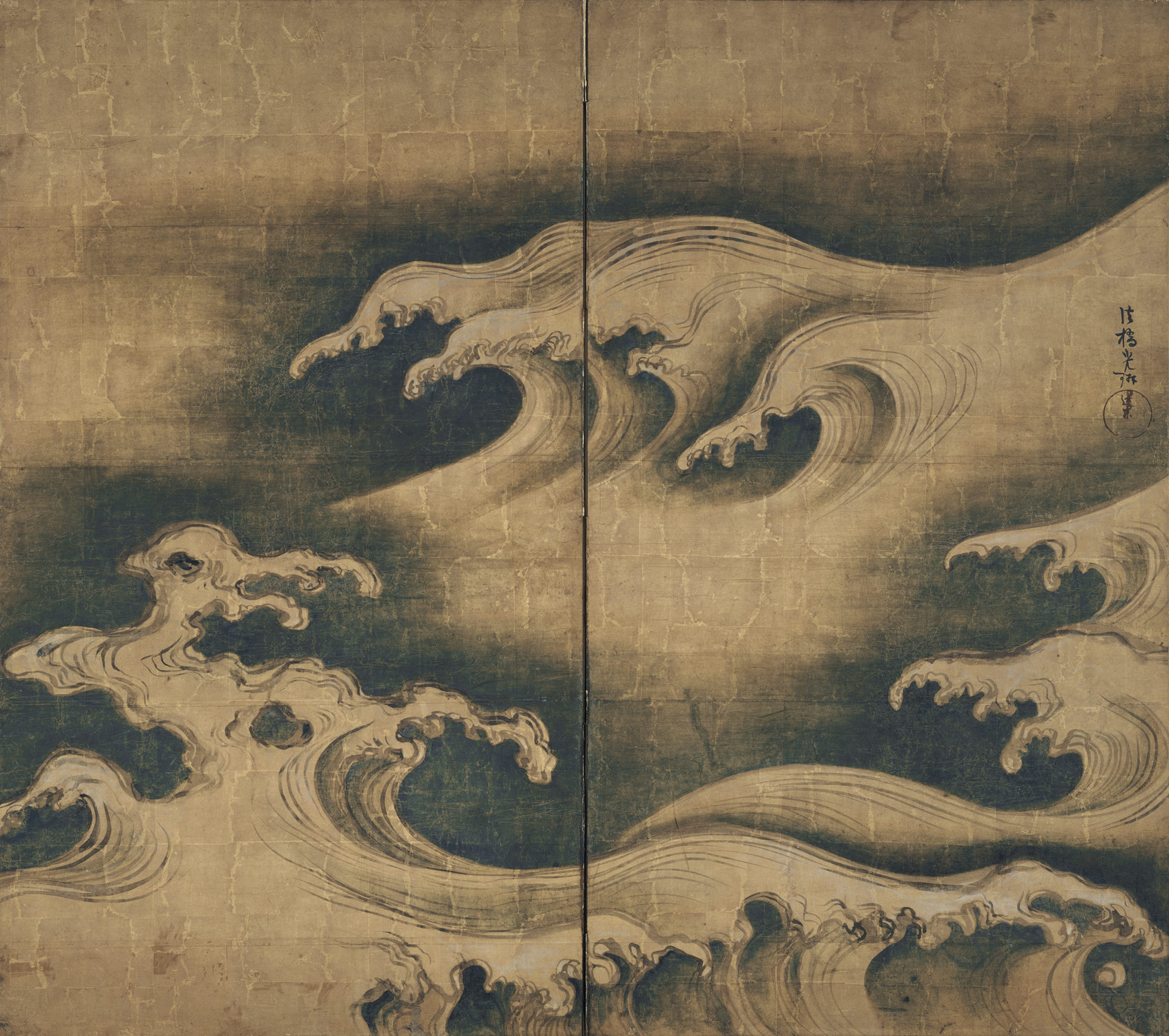
Rough Waves

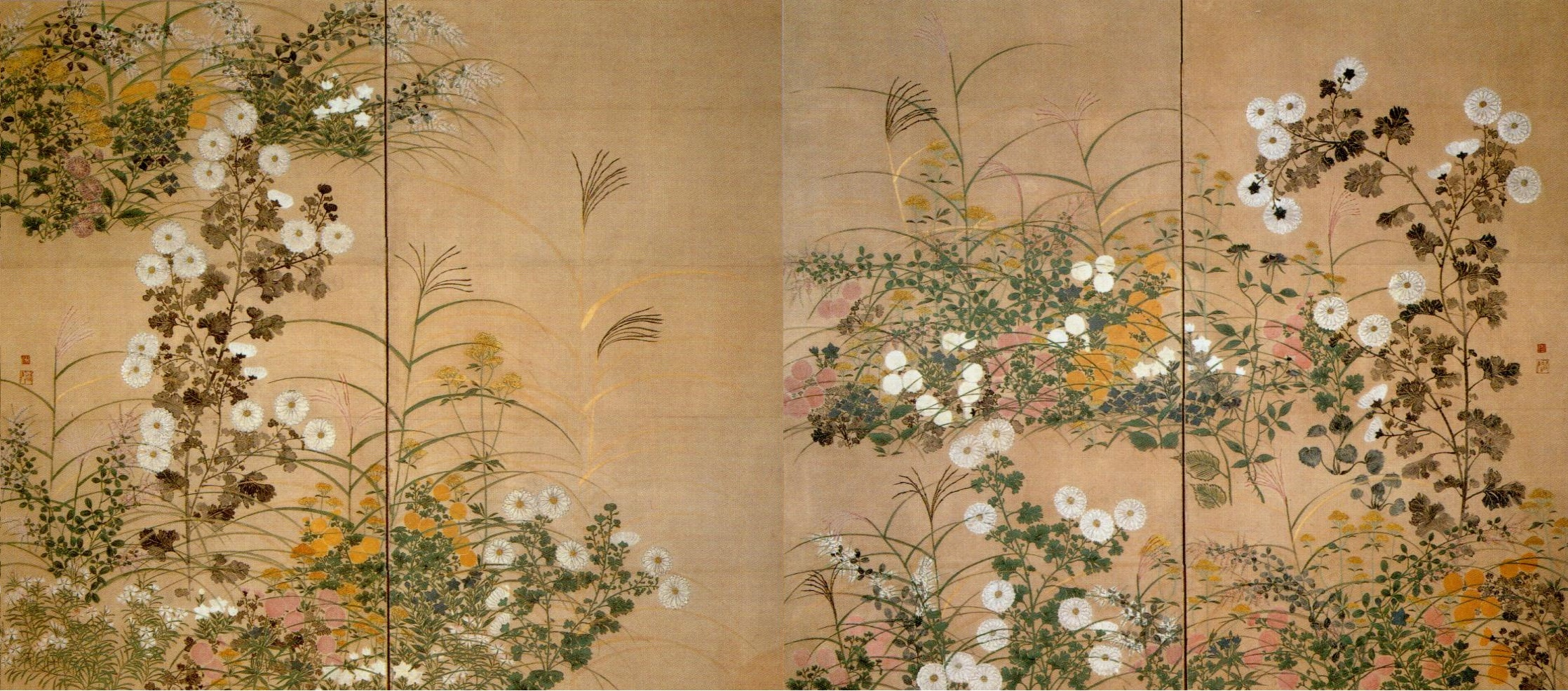
Flowering Plants in Autumn
Hanging scrolls

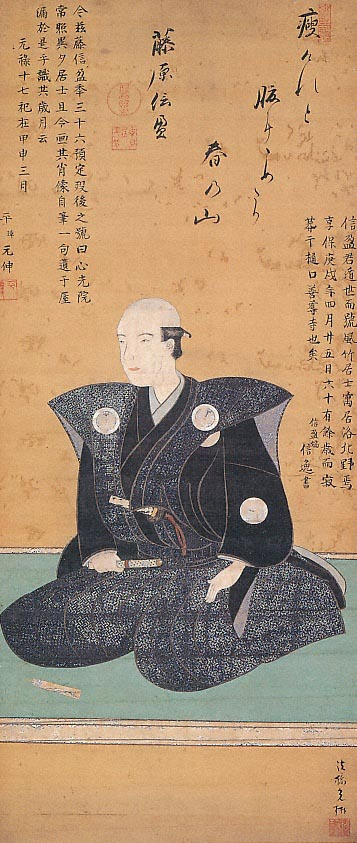
Portrait of Nakamura Kuranosuke (Important Cultural Property)

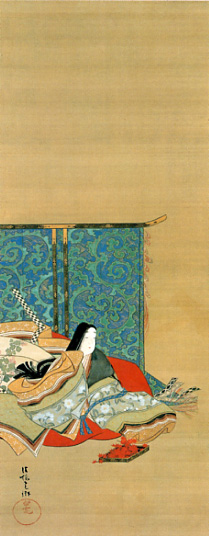
The Empress Akikonomu

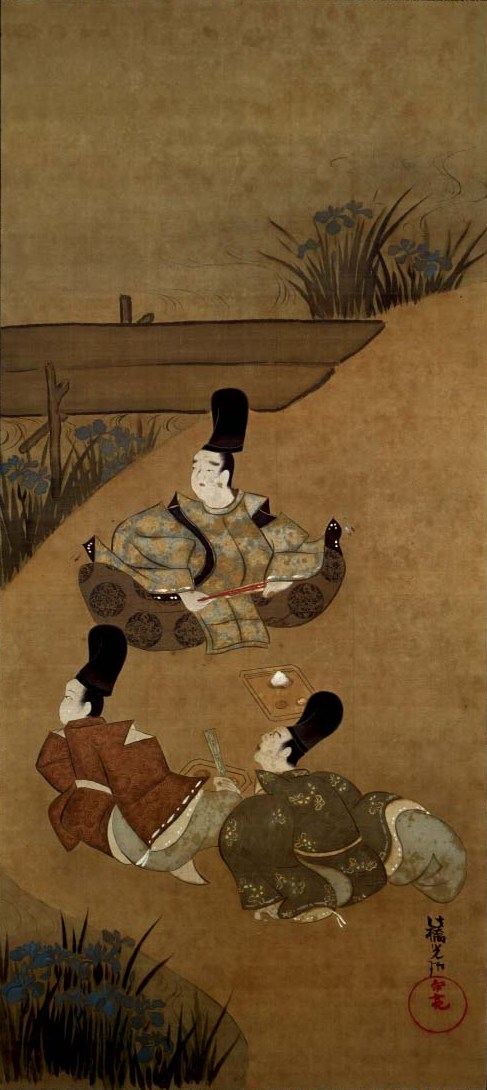
The Tales of Ise, Yatsuhashi
Crafts

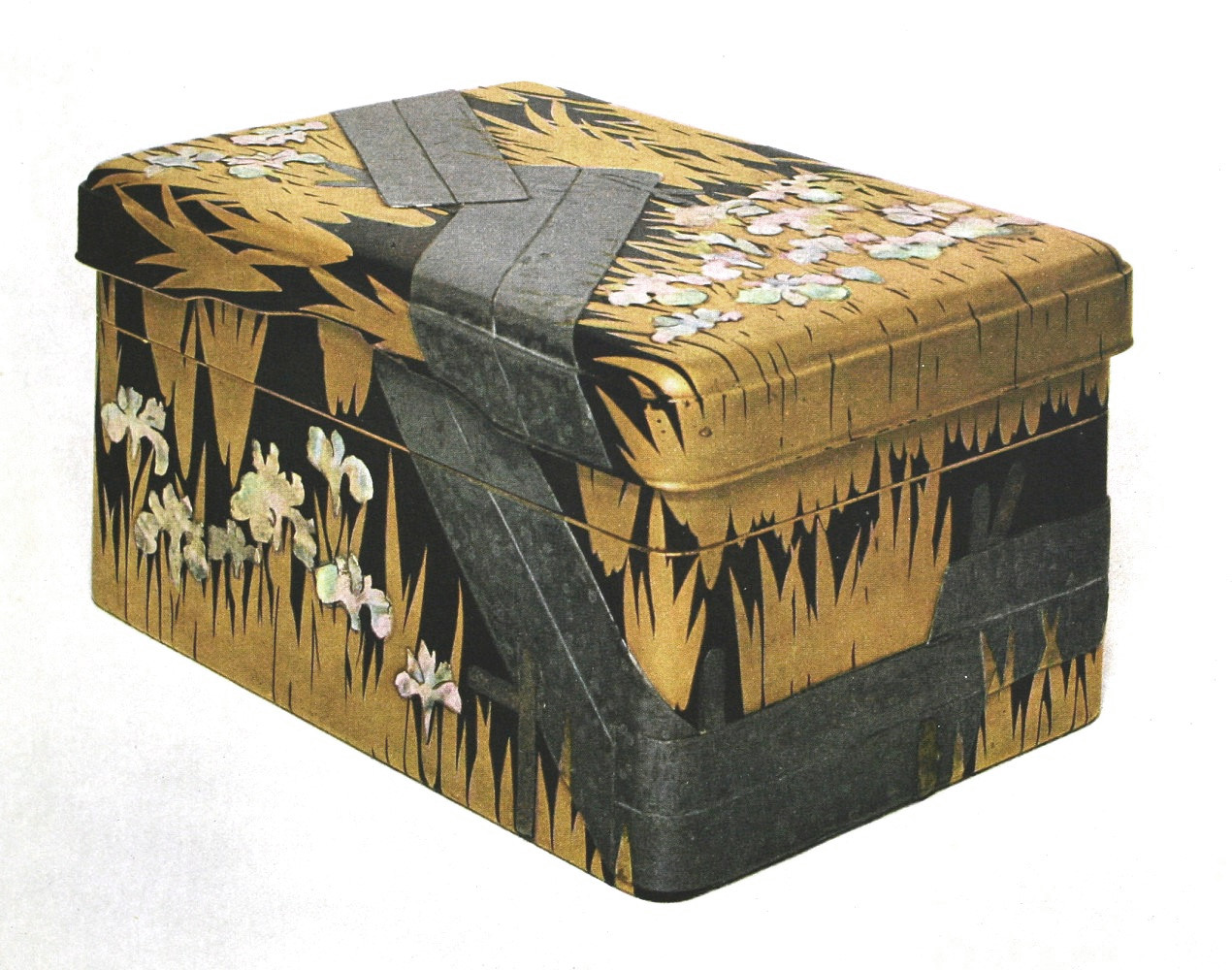
Writing Box with Eight Bridges (National Treasure)

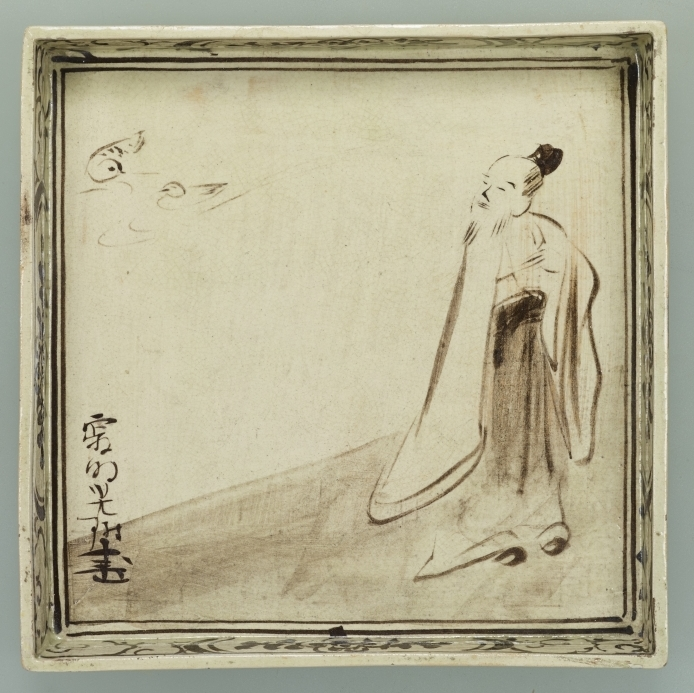
Square dish, design of poet watching wild geese (Important Cultural Property)

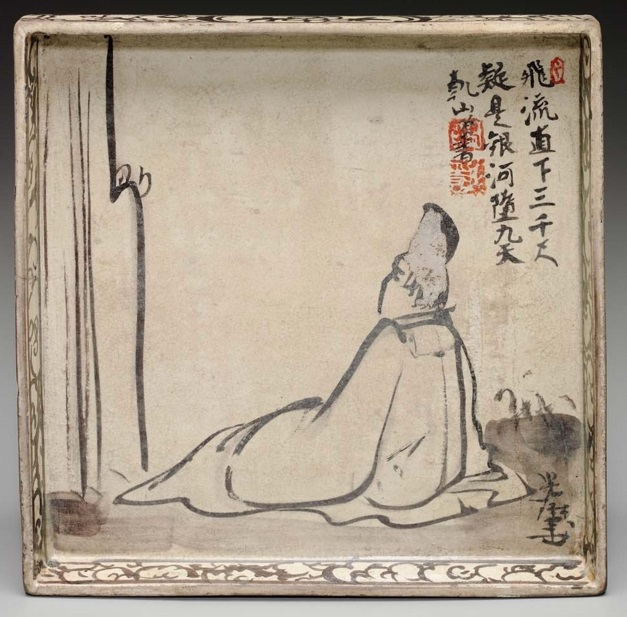
Square dish with courtier gazing at a waterfall
