= Sakai Hōitsu =

Japanese painter

Sakai Hōitsu 酒井 抱一
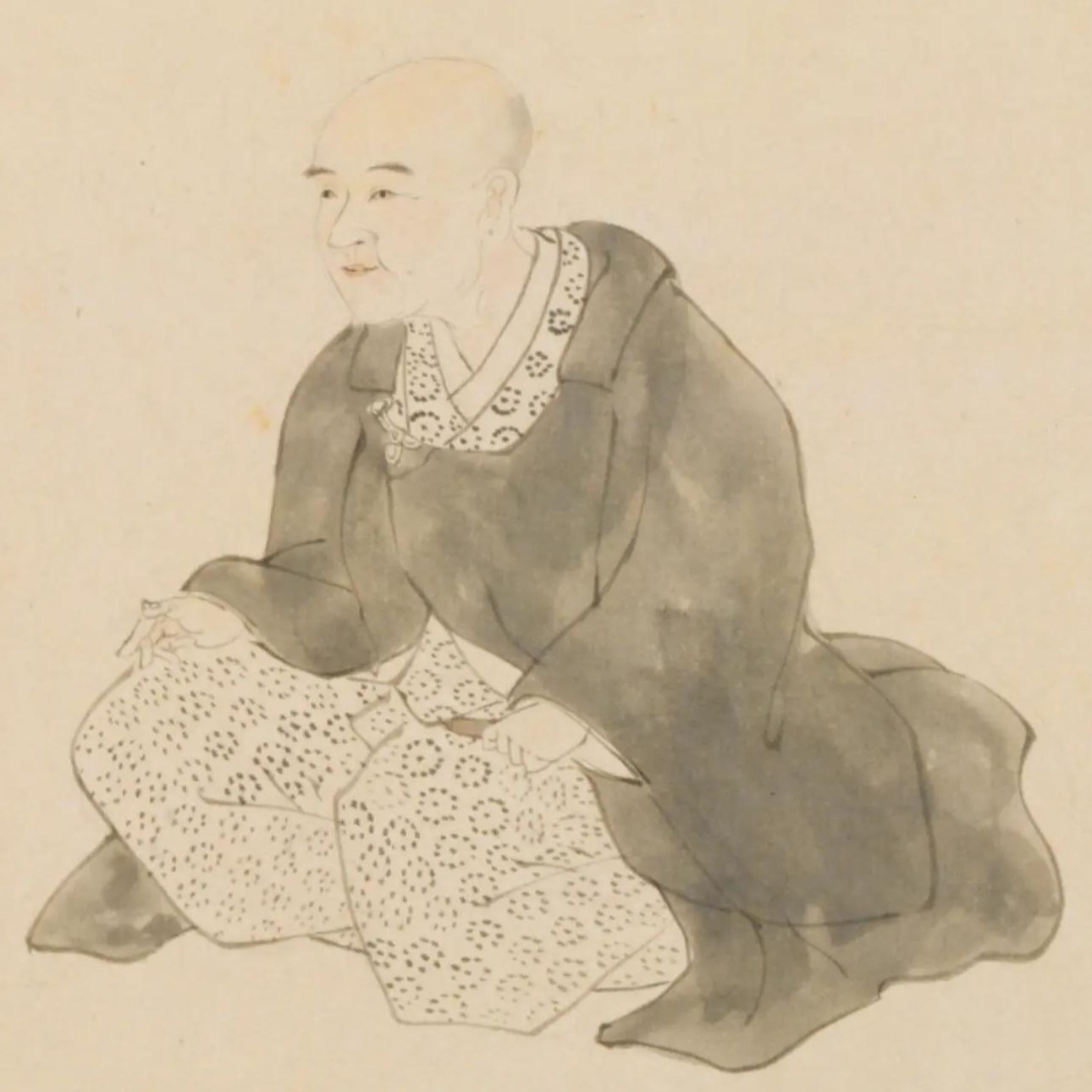
- Born: 1 August 1761; Edo, Japan
- Died: January 4, 1829 (aged 67); Edo, Japan
- Known for: Painting; Design
- Notable work: Flowering Plants of Summer and Autumn (Important Cultural Property); Wind God and Thunder God
- Movement: Rinpa school

Sakai Hōitsu (Note: Japanese pronunciation: [saꜜ.kai | hoꜜː.i.tsɯ, saꜜ.kai (|) hoː-]) (酒井 抱一; August 1, 1761 – January 4, 1829) was a Japanese painter of the Rinpa school. He is known for having revived the style and popularity of Ogata Kōrin, and for having created a number of reproductions of Kōrin's work.

== Biography ==
Sakai Hōitsu was born on 1 August 1761 in Edo. His father was the lord (daimyō) of Himeji Castle in Harima Province.

The Sakai daimyō clan originated in Mikawa Province. They claim descent from Minamoto no Arichika. Arichika had two sons: one of them, Yasuchika, took the name of Matsudaira; and the other son, Chikauji, took the name of Sakai, and this is the ancestor of the Sakai clan. Sakai Hirochika, the son of Chikauji, had two sons as well; and the descendants of these two sons gave rise to the two principal branches of the clan.

A cadet branch of the Sakai is composed of the descendants of Sakai Masachika, who was a vassal of the Tokugawa – Nobutada, Kiyoyasu et Hirotada. In 1561, Masachika was installed at Nishio Castle in Mikawa province, and the security of the castle was confided in him. In 1590, Sakai Shigetada, the son of Masachika, received the domain of Kawagoe in Musashi Province (15,000 koku); then in 1601, he was installed at Umayabashi in Kōzuke province (35,000 koku). In 1749, Sakai Tadakiyo (1626–1681) and his descendants were transferred to Himeji in Harima Province (150,000 koku); and they remained daimyō at Himeji until the Meiji period.

Moving to Kyoto, Hōitsu began his studies in art in the Kanō school before moving on to study under Utagawa Toyoharu of the ukiyo-e style. He later studied under Watanabe Nangaku of the Maruyama school and Sō Shiseki of the nanga style before finally becoming a painter of the Rinpa school.

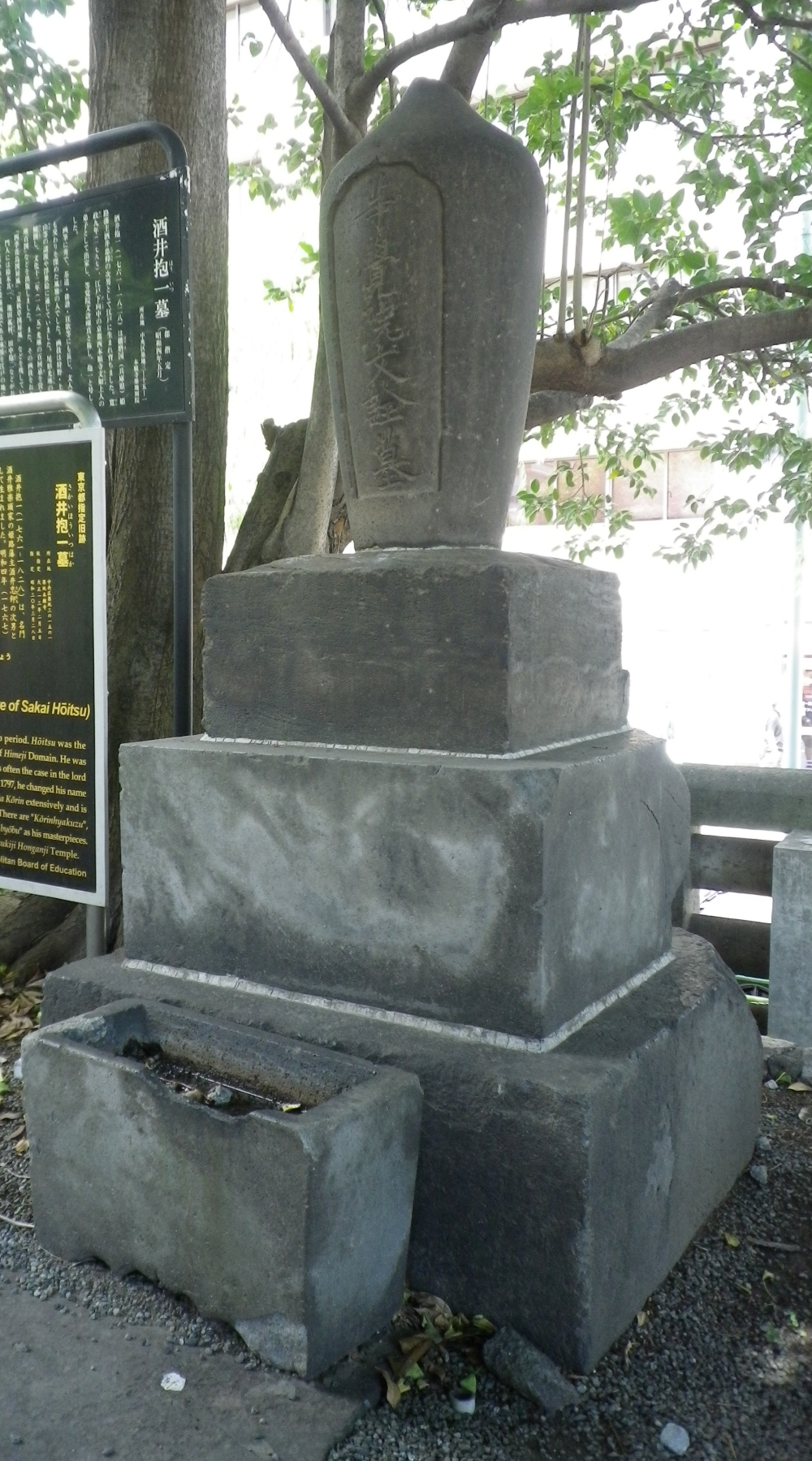
Sakai Hoitsu's tomb

Hōitsu, citing poor health as a reason, became a Buddhist priest in 1797, and spent the last 21 years of his life in seclusion. During this time, he studied the work of Ogata Kōrin extensively, as well as that of Kōrin's brother Ogata Kenzan, and produced a number of reproductions of the brothers' works. He also produced two books of woodblock prints of the brothers' work, as well as one book of his own; these were titled Kōrin Hyakuzu (1815), Kenzan Iboku Gafu (1823), and Oson Gafu respectively. He died at the age of 66, on 4 January 1829, in Edo.

== Style ==
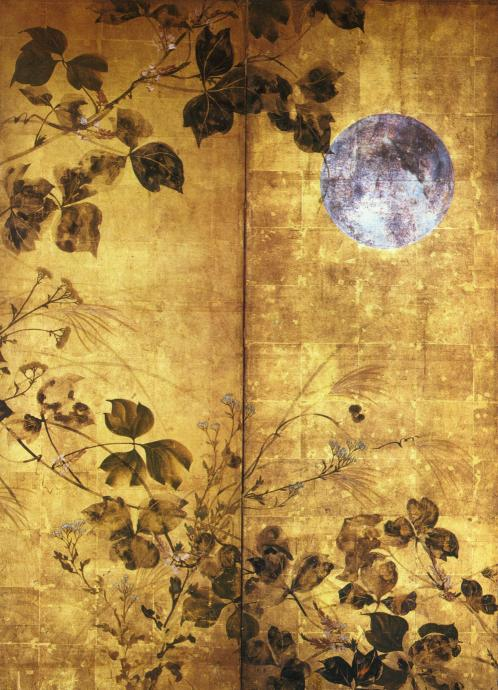
Autumn Flowers and Moon

Hōitsu's style shows elements of the realism of ukiyo-e, but resembles particularly the decorative style of Ogata Kōrin, which Hōitsu took major steps to revive.

According to critic Robert Hughes, the core achievement in painting during the Edo period was the allusive and delicate work of the Rinpa artists; and in Hōitsu's large folding screen Flowers and Grasses of Summer and Autumn, he says, "you can almost feel the wind bending the rhythmical pattern of stems and leaves against their silver ground." In another screen, Flowering Plants of Summer, Hughes suggested that Hoitsu "possessed epigrammatic powers of observation," as demonstrated in another screen, Flowering Plants of Summer, in which "the fronds bend and bow under the summer rain, weaving a delicate lattice of green against the now tarnished silver ground." According to scholar Meccarelli the style used for painting vegetation was not faithful to chiaroscuro or naturalism, but rather retook the flora and fauna decorative paintings of Nanpin school.

== Works ==
Flowering Plants of Summer and Autumn (夏秋草図屏風) is a pair of two-folded byōbu folding screens made using ink and color on silver and gold-foiled paper. The work depicts plants and flowers from the autumn and summer seasons, and it is considered one of his best paintings.

It was painted on the back of Kōrin's Wind God and Thunder God screens (show below), that Hōitsu's family owned. The monumental two-sided byōbu screens became a symbol of the Rinpa tradition, but both sides of the screens have since been separated to protect them from damage.

Flowering Plants of Summer and Autumn

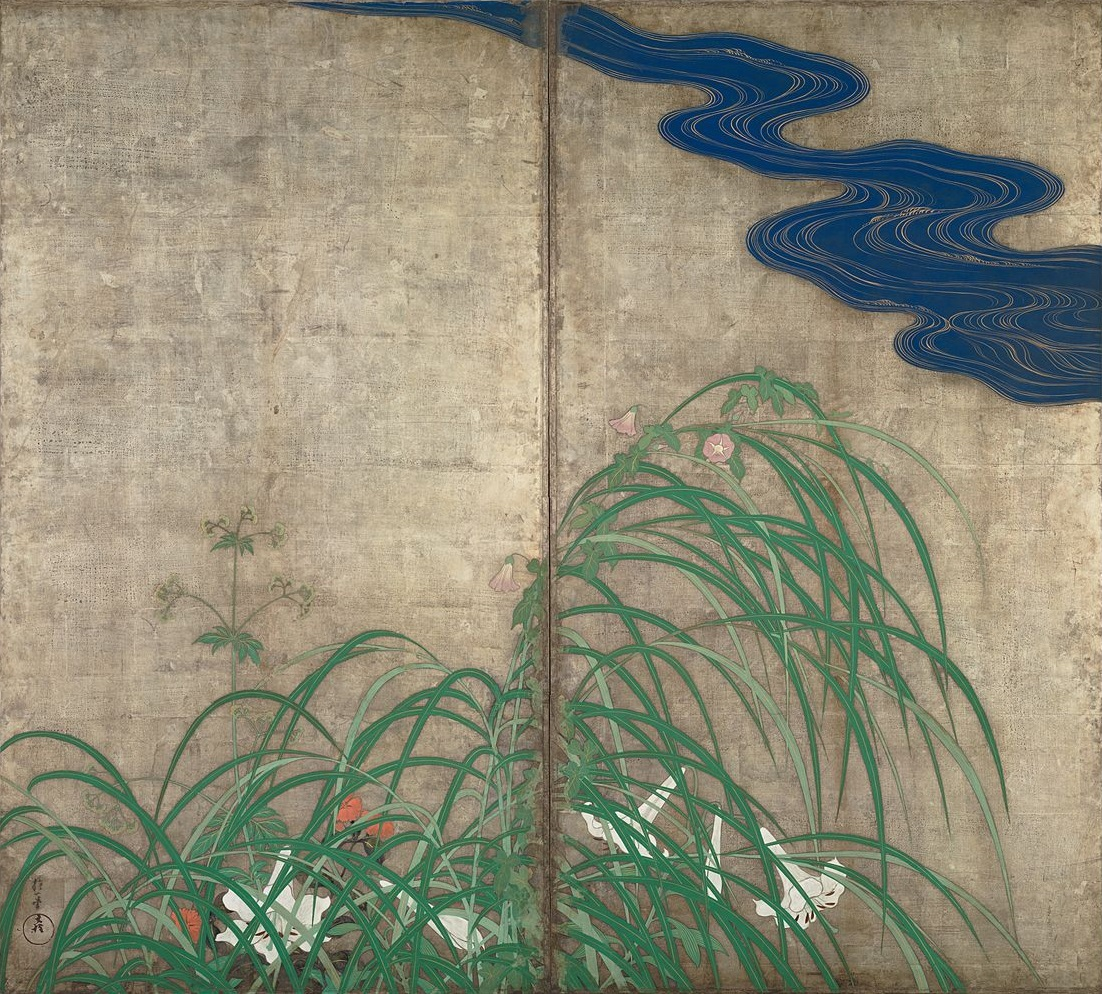

The screens measure 416.6 by 461.8 centimetres (164.5 in × 181.8 in) each. They are now part of the collection of the Tokyo National Museum, where they are exhibited occasionally. They are an Important Cultural Property.

Wind God and Thunder God (紙本金地著色風神雷神図) is a pair of two-folded screens made using ink and color on gold-foiled paper. They are an homage to both the original painting by Tawaraya Sōtatsu and Kōrin's later copy. The screens depicts Raijin, the god of lightning, thunder and storms in the Shinto religion and in Japanese mythology, and Fūjin, the god of wind. All three versions of the work were displayed together for the first time in seventy-five years in 2015, at the Kyoto National Museum exhibition "Rinpa: The Aesthetics of the Capital".

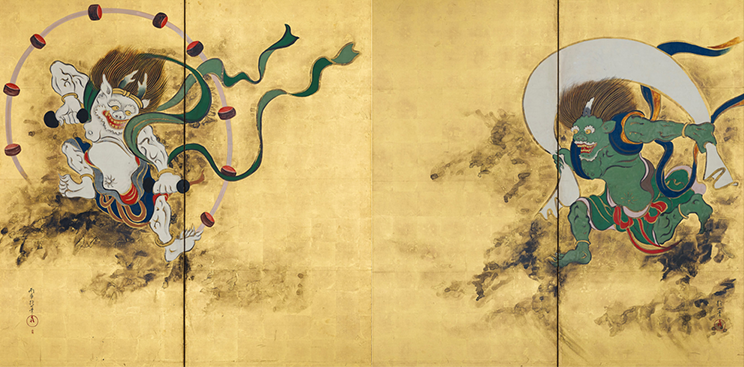
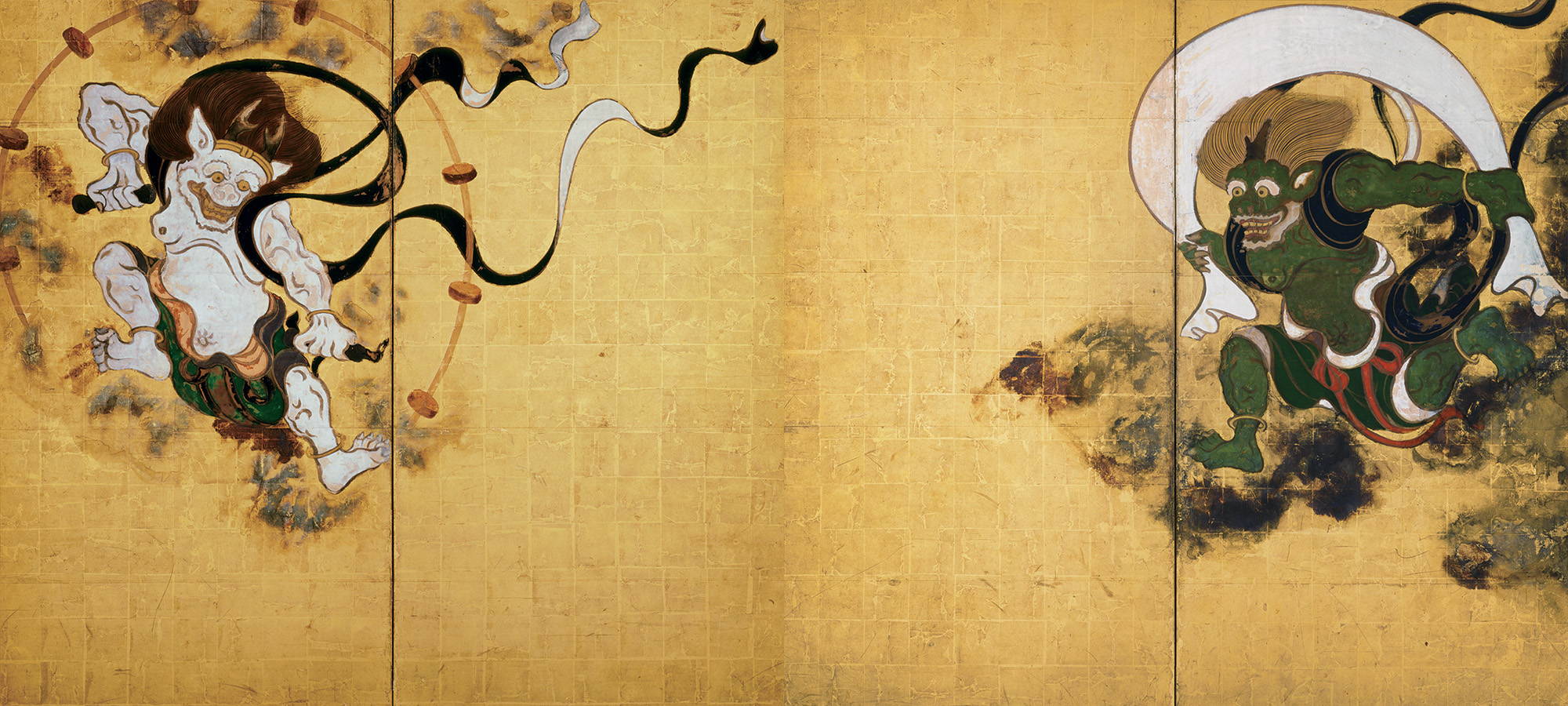
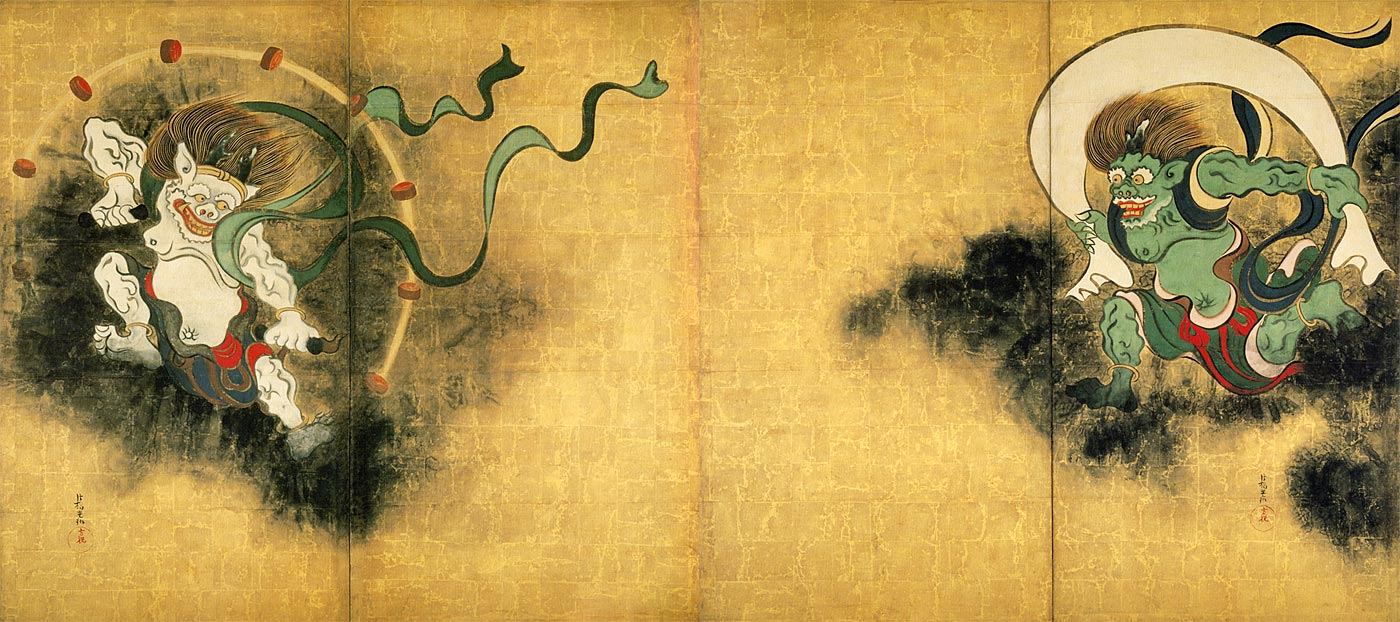
Hōitsu's version (above), Sōtatsu's original (below, left) and Kōrin's version (below, right)

The screens now belong to the Idemitsu Museum of Arts in Tokyo, where they were last displayed from September 16 to November 5, 2017, in The Art of Edo Rimpa exhibition.
