= Tawaraya Sōtatsu =

Japanese painter

- 俵屋 宗達
- Born: c. 1570; Kyoto, Japan
- Died: c. 1640; Japan
- Occupations: Furniture designer, painter
- Known for: Painting
- Notable work: Wind God and Thunder God (National Treasure); Painting of the chapters Sekiya and Miotsukushi from The Tale of Genji (National Treasure); Water Fowl in the Lotus Pond (National Treasure)
- Movement: Rinpa school

Tawaraya Sōtatsu (俵屋 宗達; c. 1570 – c. 1640) was a Japanese furniture designer and painter of the Rinpa school.

Sōtatsu is best known for his decorations of calligraphic works by his partner Hon'ami Kōetsu (1558–1637), and his spectacular and highly influential byōbu folding screens, such as National Treasures Wind God and Thunder God and his painting of the Sekiya and Miotsukushi chapters from The Tale of Genji. He also popularized a technique called tarashikomi, in which a second layer of paint is applied before the first layer is dry.

He is also credited with co-founding the Rinpa school of Japanese painting, together with Kōetsu. Rinpa was not strictly a school, but a group of artist directly influenced by Sōtatsu and Kōetsu. Some of the most notable Rinpa artists are Ogata Kōrin (1658–1716), Ogata Kenzan (1663–1743) and Sakai Hōitsu (1761–1828). While not particularly known at the time he lived and painted, he is now the second-most recognized Japanese painter in terms of number of inclusions in the National Treasures of Japan list.

== Biography ==
The exact date of Sōtatsu's birth, probably around 1570, remains unknown, and so does the place of his birth. The painter Tani Bunchō (1763–1841) stated that Sōtatsu was originally from Noto and that he studied under Sumiyoshi Jokei in Kyoto. His family name may have been Nonomura.

In 1602 he was hired by the Taira family to repair the 12th-century sutra scrolls Heike nōkyō at the Itsukushima shrine on Miyajima. This is the earliest paintings attributed to Sōtatsu, but it already features the characteristics of his later work. It is suspected that Kōetsu might have also worked in the repair of the scroll.

The first confirmed collaboration with Hon'ami Kōetsu (1558–1637) is in the Sagabon (Saga Books), an ambitious project started around 1606 by Suminokura Soan (1571–1632) to publish elaborate editions of classical Japanese book and Noh librettos. Sōtatsu created the designs for the covers and paper of many of the books, while Kōetsu was the calligrapher of some of the texts. The name Sagabon comes from the suburb of Kyoto where the book were produced.

Sōtatsu married a cousin of Koetsu. He also opened a shop in Kyoto, named Tawaraya, where he sold a variety of decorated objects, including fans, lantern paper, screens, dolls and patterns for kimono, and also took commissions for decorating interiors. The shop soon gained recognition for its artistic excellence.

The collaboration between Sōtatsu and Kōetsu came to an end around 1620, perhaps because he was moving away from the profession of decorator and designer, and started focusing more on his career as a painter.

He decorated the doors and screens of the Yōgen-in temple during the reconstruction ordered by Tokugawa Hidetada's wife in 1621, and in 1630 he was given the title of hokkyō ("Bridge of the Dharma"), the third highest rank awarded to Buddhist artists.

The circumstances of Sōtatsu's death are not known, but he probably died around 1640. The most successful among his direct students were Tawaraya Sōsetsu and Kitawaga Sōsetsu.

== Works ==
Waves at Matsushima, painted in the 1620s, is considered by some to be Sōtatsu's masterwork.

Anthology with Cranes (鶴図下絵和歌巻) is a handscroll decorated by Sōtatsu using silver and gold pigment, with calligraphy by Hon'ami Kōetsu. It contains some of the finest calligraphy by Kōetsu and one of the best examples of Sōtatsu's decorative skills. The work was most likely produced between 1602 and 1620, the period during which Sōtatsu and Kōetsu are generally considered to have worked together.

The text of the scroll is a compilation of waka poems from the poets known collectively as Thirty-Six Immortals of Poetry ("Thirty-Six Immortals of Poetry"), including one poem from each one of the 36 members of the group. The visual motif is that of cranes, which stand or fly in flocks across the entire length of the scroll. The skill of Sōtatsu's design and its "cutting-edge originality" have been highly praised.

Anthology with Cranes (details)

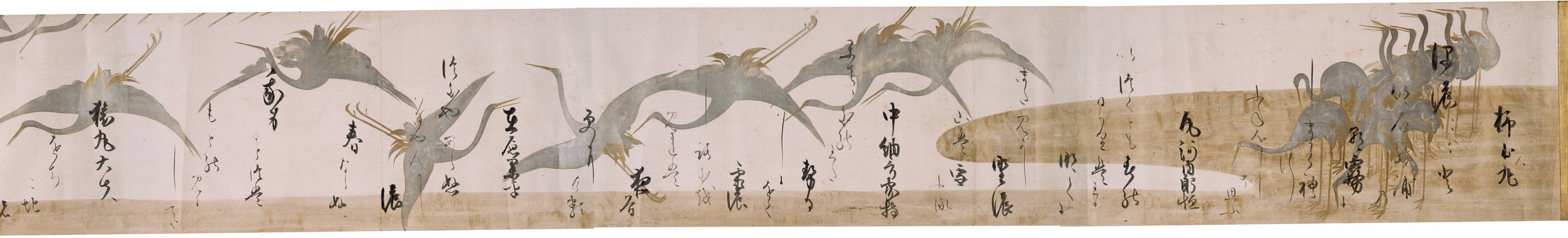

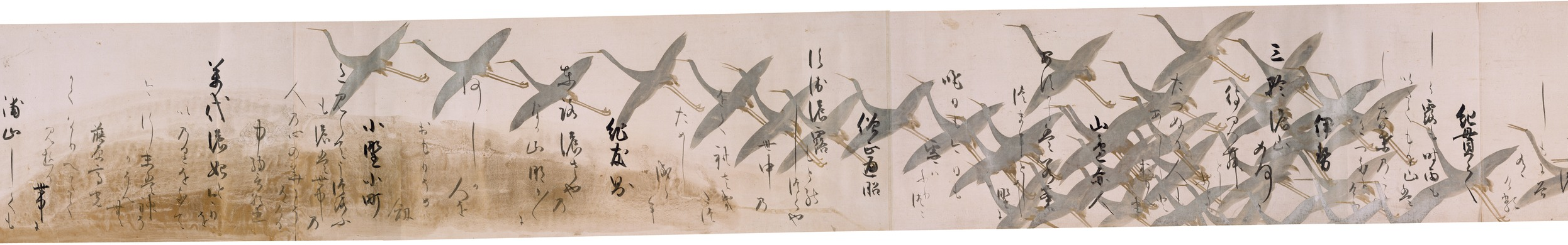

The scroll measures 34.1 cm x 1356 cm and belongs to the Kyoto National Museum. It is an Important Cultural Property.

Poem Scroll with Deer is another collaboration with Hon'ami Kōetsu. Silver and gold deer frolic alongside poems from the anthology Shin Kokinshu (新古今集). It was split into fragments after World War II. The largest contiguous section, accounting for more than one-third of the complete work, is currently at the Seattle Art Museum.

Wind God and Thunder God (紙本金地著色風神雷神図) is a pair of two-folded screens made using ink and color on gold-foiled paper. It depicts Raijin, the god of lightning, thunder and storms in the Shinto religion and in Japanese mythology, and Fūjin, the god of wind. The screens have no inscription or seal, but its attribution to Tawaraya Sotatsu is not questioned.

It is a particularly prominent work in the Rinpa school because two other of its major figures, Ogata Kōrin (1658–1716) and Sakai Hōitsu (1761–1828), replicated the painting in homage (see Kōrin's version). All three versions of the work were displayed together for the first time in seventy-five years in 2015, at the Kyoto National Museum exhibition "Rinpa: The Aesthetics of the Capital".

Wind God and Thunder God

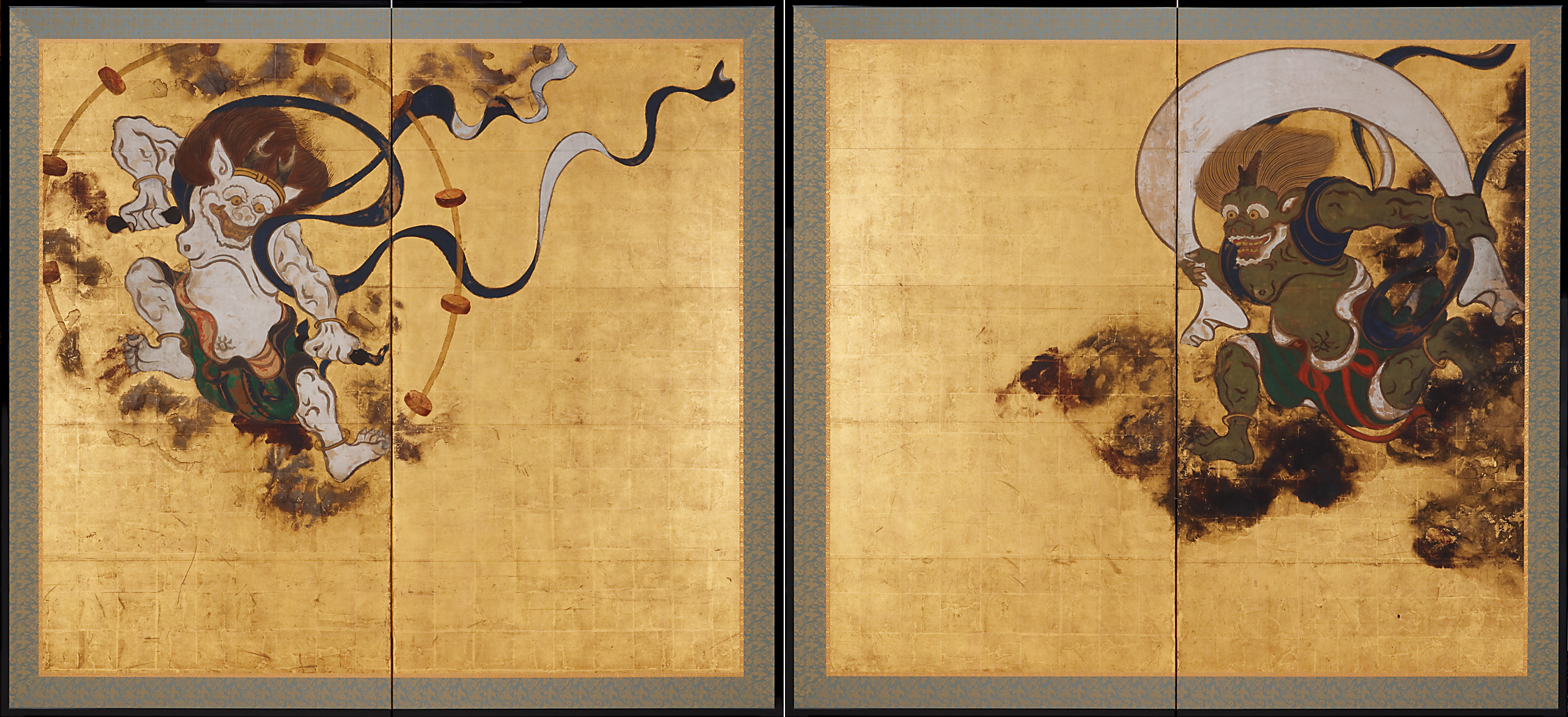
Wind God Fujin (right) and Thunder God Raijin (left)

Each screen measures 169.8 cm × 154.5 cm (66.9 in × 60.8 in). They belong to the Zen Buddhist temple Kennin-ji in Kyoto, but they are exhibited occasionally in the Kyoto National Museum. They are a National Treasure of Japan.

Dragons and Clouds is a work in the Freer Gallery of Art, also known as the National Museum of Asian Art, in Washington, D.C. and was not discussed by Japanese art historians until 1971, when Yumane Yuzo placed this painting in the context of artworks in Japan, such as the Waves and Dragon screen in the Honpou-ji Temple in Kyoto. Details about the ownership of this painting prior to its purchase by Charles Lang Freer in 1905 from the art dealer Bunshichi Kobayashi are unknown, but it's now considered one of the finest example's of Sotatsu's use of the tarashikomi wet-on-wet technique, in which ink is artfully pooled to create features such as the clouds.

At the time Sotatsu created this screen, monochrome ink paintings of dragons were often based on 15th-century work by monk-painters such as Sesshu and Sesson, and also the earlier, Chinese painters Chen Rong (famed for his dragon paintings) and Muqi. By the 17th-century, dragons had emerged as a popular motif on large format works such as folding screens and sliding door panels. Sotatsu's Dragon and Clouds is a six-panel screen, is dated to early 1600s although its place in the chronology of his work is disputed, and has dimensions of 171.5x 374.3 cm (top), 171.5 x 374.6 cm (bottom). The ascending, larger dragon on one side soars towards the heavens in spring, whereas the side's dragon descends into the abyss in fall.

Dragons and Clouds

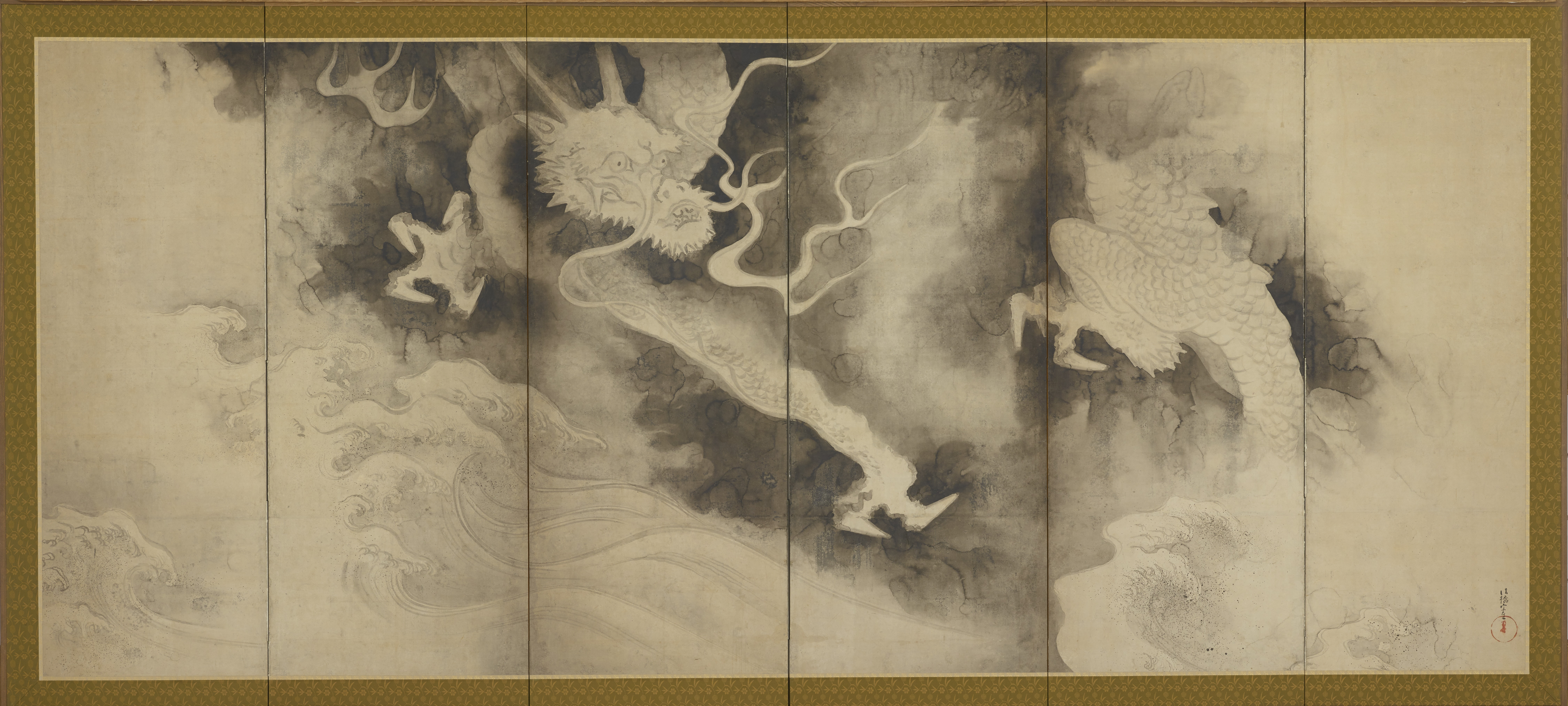
Sotatsu, Dragons and Clouds, early 1600s

== Exhibitions ==
The Freer Gallery of Art organized the first retrospective outside Japan from October 2015 to January 2016.
