= Rinpa school =

Major historical school of Japanese painting

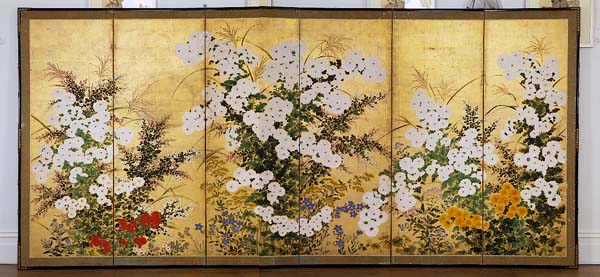
Spring Landscape, unknown Rinpa school painter, 18th century, six-screen ink and gold on paper.

Rinpa (琳派, Rinpa) is one of the major historical schools of Japanese painting. It was created in 17th century Kyoto by Hon'ami Kōetsu (1558–1637) and Tawaraya Sōtatsu (d. c.1643). Roughly fifty years later, the style was consolidated by brothers Ogata Kōrin (1658–1716) and Ogata Kenzan (1663–1743).

The term "Rinpa" is an abbreviation consisting of the last syllable from "Kōrin" with the word for school (派, ha) (with rendaku changing this to "pa"), coined in the Meiji period. Previously, the style was referred to variously as the Kōetsu school (光悦派, Kōetsu-ha), or Kōetsu-Kōrin school (光悦光琳派, Kōetsu-Kōrin-ha), or the Sōtatsu-Kōrin school (宗達光琳派, Sōtatsu-Kōrin-ha).

== History ==
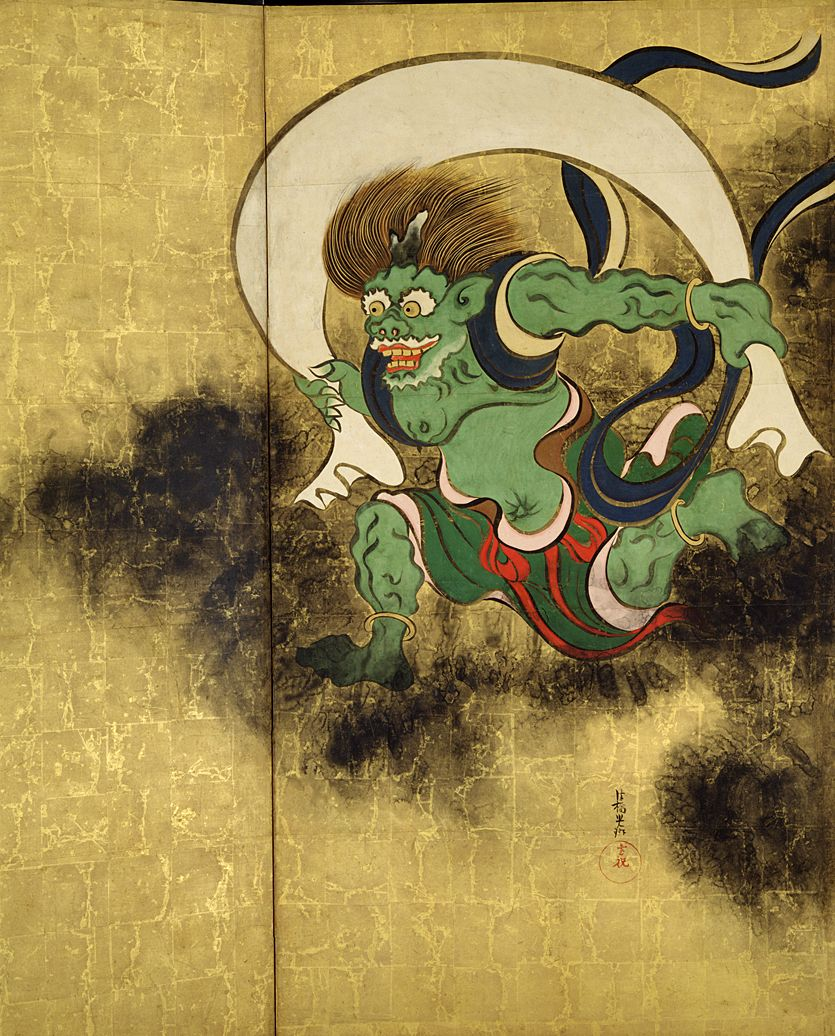
Portion of Sōtatsu's Fūjin Raijin-zu

Hon'ami Kōetsu founded an artistic community of craftsmen supported by wealthy merchant patrons of the Nichiren Buddhist sect at Takagamine in northeastern Kyoto in 1615. Both the affluent merchant town elite and the old Kyoto aristocratic families favored arts which followed classical traditions, and Kōetsu obliged by producing numerous works of ceramics, calligraphy and lacquerware.

His collaborator, Tawaraya Sōtatsu, maintained an atelier in Kyoto and produced commercial paintings such as decorative fans and folding screens. Sōtatsu also specialized in making decorated paper with gold or silver backgrounds, to which Kōetsu assisted by adding calligraphy.

Both artists came from families of cultural significance; Kōetsu came from a family of swordsmiths who had served the imperial court and the great warlords, Oda Nobunaga and Toyotomi Hideyoshi, in addition to the Ashikaga shōguns. Kōetsu's father evaluated swords for the Maeda clan, as did Kōetsu himself. However, Kōetsu was less concerned with swords as opposed to painting, calligraphy, lacquerwork, and the Japanese tea ceremony (he created several Raku ware tea bowls.) His own painting style was flamboyant, recalling the aristocratic style of the Heian period.

Sōtatsu also pursued the classical Yamato-e genre as Kōetsu, but pioneered a new technique with bold outlines and striking color schemes. One of his most famous works are the folding screens Wind and Thunder Gods (風神雷神図, Fūjin Raijin-zu) at Kennin-ji temple in Kyoto and "Matsushima" (松島) at the Freer Gallery.

== Later development ==
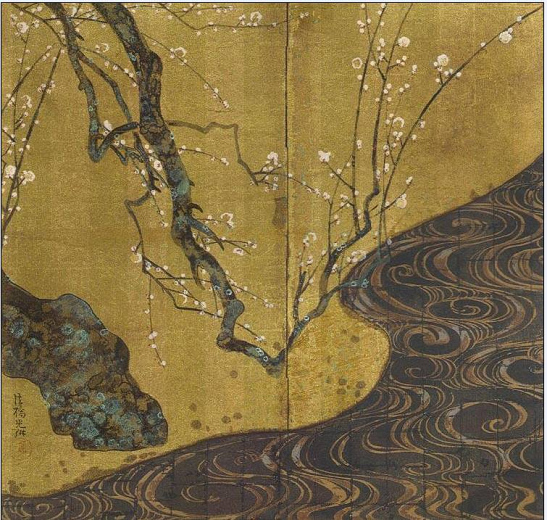
Portion of Ogata Kōrin's Red and White Plum Blossoms (紅白梅図, Kōhakubai-zu)

The Rinpa school was revived in the Genroku era (1688–1704) by Ogata Kōrin and his younger brother Ogata Kenzan, sons of a prosperous Kyoto textile merchant. Kōrin's innovation was to depict nature as an abstract using numerous color and hue gradations, and mixing colors on the surface to achieve eccentric effects, as well as liberal use of precious substances like gold and pearl.

His masterpiece Red and White Plum Blossoms (紅白梅図, Kōhakubai-zu) c. 1714–15, is now at the MOA Museum of Art in Atami, Shizuoka. A dramatic composition, it established the direction of Rinpa for the remainder of its history. Kōrin collaborated with Kenzan in painting designs and calligraphy on his brother's pottery. Kenzan remained as a potter in Kyoto until after Kōrin's death in 1716 when he began to paint professionally. Other Rinpa artists active in this period were Tatebayashi Kagei, Tawaraya Sori, Watanabe Shiko, Fukae Roshu and Nakamura Hochu.

== Modern Rinpa ==
Rinpa was revived in 19th century Edo by Sakai Hōitsu (1761–1828), a Kanō school artist whose family had been one of Ogata Kōrin’s sponsors. Sakai published a series of 100 woodcut prints based on paintings by Kōrin, and his painting Summer and Autumn Grasses (夏秋草図, Natsu akikusa-zu) painted on the back of Kōrin’s "Wind and Thunder Gods screen" is now at the Tokyo National Museum.

Paintings of the early Rinpa artists were anthologized in small paperback booklets such as the Korin Gafu (The Korin Picture Album) by Nakamura Hochu, first published in 1806. This was followed by an original work by Sakai Hoitsu called the Oson Gafu, published in 1817.

Sakai had numerous students who carried the movement forward into the late 19th century, when it was incorporated into the Nihonga movement by Okakura Kakuzō and other painters. The influence of Rinpa was strong throughout the early modern period, and even today Rinpa-style designs are popular. One later artist of note is Kamisaka Sekka.

== Style ==
Rinpa artists worked in various formats, notably screens, fans and hanging scrolls, woodblock printed books, lacquerware, ceramics, and kimono textiles. Many Rinpa paintings were used on the sliding doors and walls (fusuma) of noble homes.

Subject matter and style were often borrowed from Heian period traditions of yamato-e, with elements from Muromachi ink paintings, Chinese Ming dynasty flower-and-bird paintings, as well as Momoyama-period Kanō school developments. The stereotypical standard painting in the Rinpa style involves simple natural subjects such as birds, plants and flowers, with the background filled in with gold leaf. This technique is known as gold ground. Emphasis on refined design and technique became more pronounced as the Rinpa style developed.

The Rinpa style flourished in Kyōto, Nara, and Ōsaka, i.e., the political and cultural triangle of ancient Japan. Kyōto and Ōsaka were also two of the most important cities of the Nanga (南画 "Southern painting"), also known as Bunjinga (文人画 "literati painting") school's style; Nanga painting was therefore exposed to the influence of Rinpa painting and vice versa.

== Notable Rinpa artists ==
- Hon'ami Kōetsu
- Tawaraya Sōtatsu
- Ogata Kōrin
- Ogata Kenzan
- Sakai Hōitsu
- Suzuki Kiitsu
- Kamisaka Sekka

== Exhibitions ==
- Rimpa: Outstanding Works of the Korin School (1972, October 10 - December 3) Tokyo National Museum, Tokyo
- Treasures by Rinpa Masters (2008, October 7 - November 16) Tokyo National Museum, Tokyo
- Korin: National Treasure Irises of the Nezu Museum and Eight-Bridge of The Metropolitan Museum of Art (2012, April 21 - May 20) Nezu Museum, Tokyo
- Designing Nature: The Rinpa Aesthetic in Japanese Art (2012-2013, May 26 - January 13) Metropolitan Museum of Art, New York City
- RINPA: The Aesthetics of the Capital (2015, October 10 - November 23) Kyoto National Museum, Kyoto
- Sōtatsu: Making Waves (2015-2016, October 24 - January 31) Arthur M. Sackler Gallery, Washington, D.C.
- Suzuki Kiitsu: Standard-bearer of the Edo Rimpa School (2016, September 10 - October 30) Suntory Museum of Art, Tokyo
- The Art of Edo Rimpa (2017, September 16 - November 7) Idemitsu Museum of Arts, Tokyo
