= Fūjin =

Japanese god of the wind

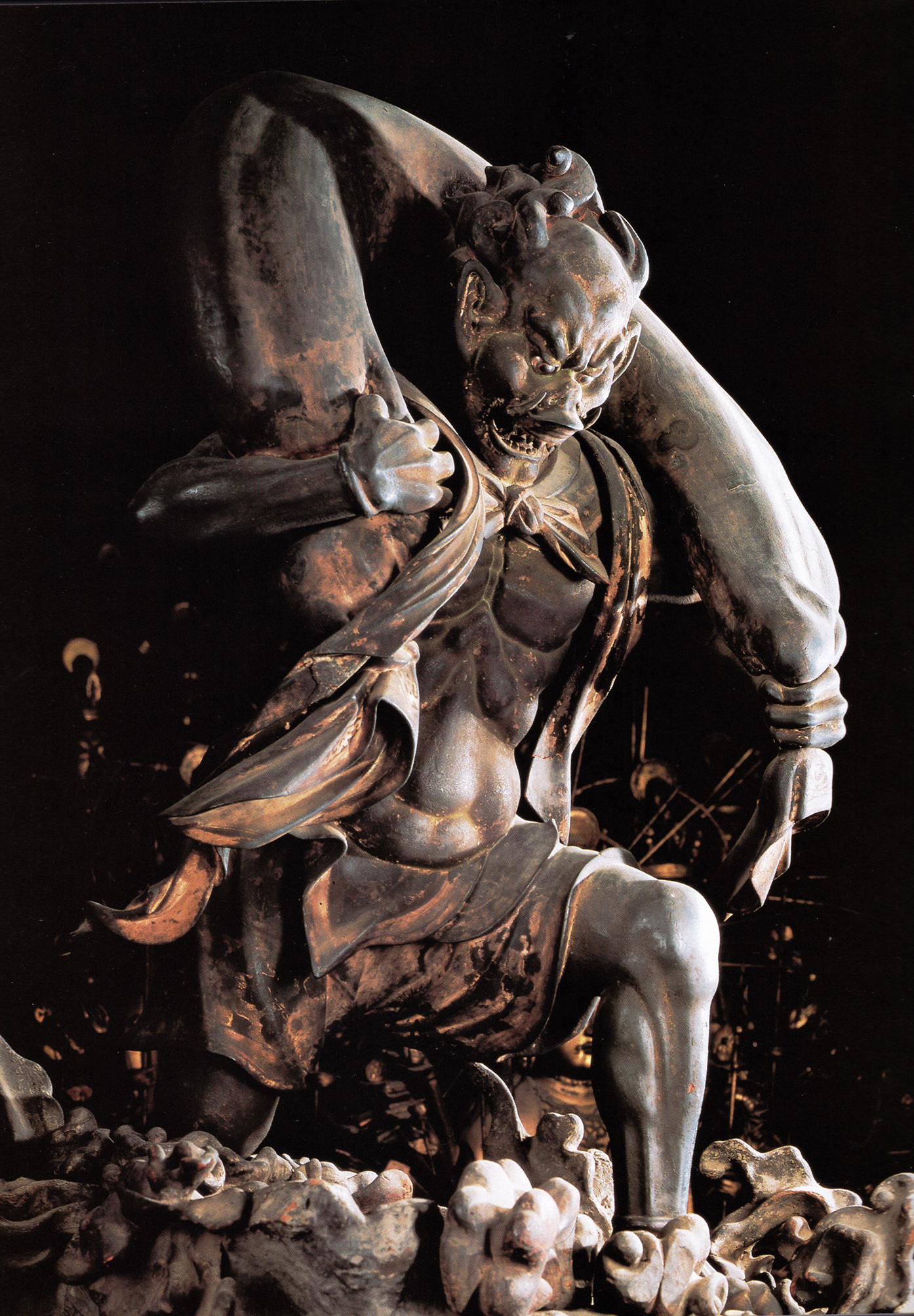
Sculpture of Fūjin from Sanjūsangen-dō temple in Kyoto. Kamakura period, 13th century

Fūjin (風神; lit. "Wind God") or Fūten (風天; lit. "Heavenly Wind"), sometimes also known as Ryobu, is the Japanese god of the wind and one of the eldest Shinto and Buddhist gods. He is portrayed as a terrifying wizardly demon, resembling a red-haired, green-skinned humanoid wearing a tiger or leopard skin loincloth/kilt, carrying a large, inflated bag of winds (風袋; Kazebuko/Fūtai) on his shoulders. In Japanese art, the deity is often depicted together with his twin-brother, Raijin, the god of lightning & thunder, and together, along with their brother, Susanoo-no-Mikoto, they are the Shinto gods (Kami) of storms.

== Myths ==
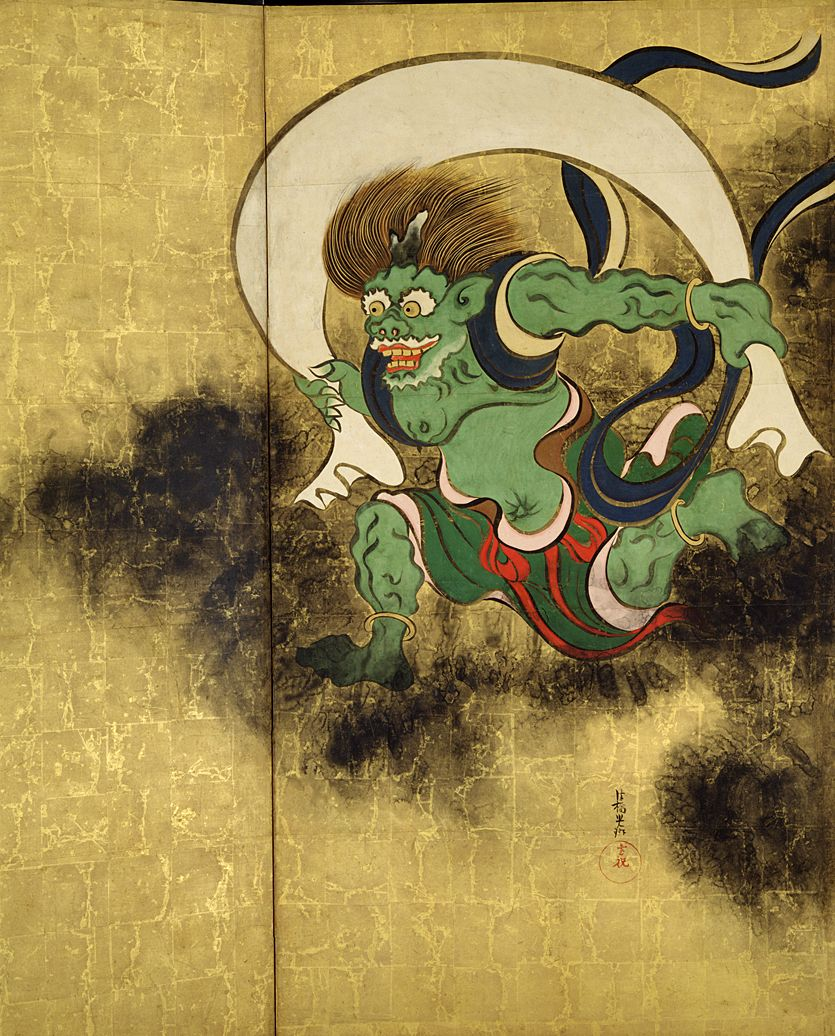
Fūjin depicted on a folding screen by Tawaraya Sōtatsu (1570–1640)

=== Birth ===
According to Kojiki, Fūjin and his brother Raijin were born from Izanami after she died.

When Izanagi went down to Yomi to retrieve his wife, he saw her as a decaying corpse covered with demons. Izanagi rejected her, making Izanami furious, leading her and a few monsters to chase after Izanagi. Izanagi then blocked the entrance to Yomi. However, a few demons and oni escaped the underworld through a crack in the boulder, including Fūjin and his brother Raijin.

Another well-known myth states that Fujin used his winds to clear dense, mist, fog and chaotic storms that existed before there was life on earth. He allowed Amasterasu, the sun goddess, to cast her light down onto the early enabling life to flourish.

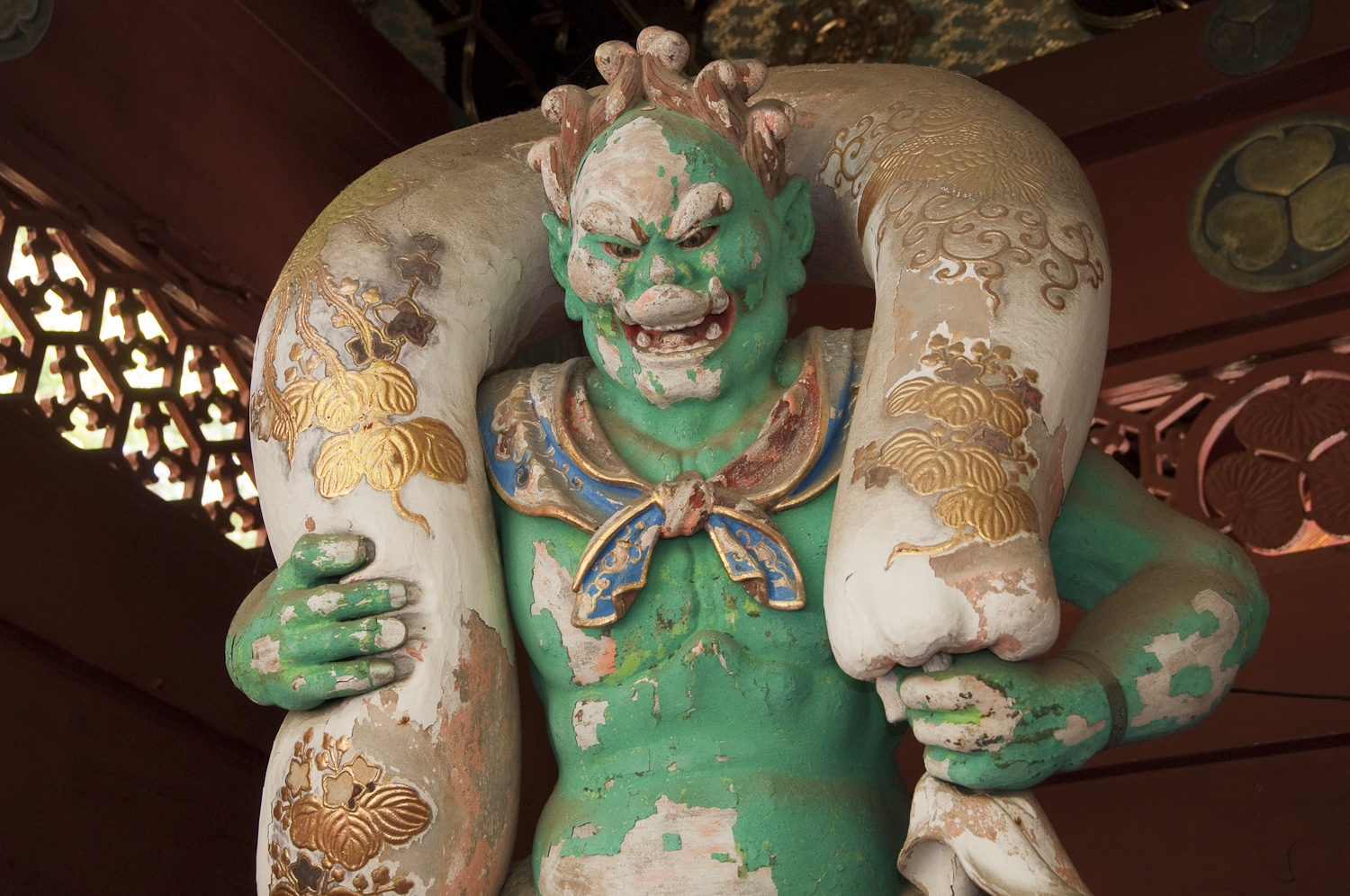
Statue at Taiyū-in in Nikkō

The iconography of Fūjin seems to have its origin in the cultural exchanges along the Silk Road. Starting with the Hellenistic period when Greece occupied parts of Central Asia and India, the Greek wind god Boreas became the god Wardo/Oado in Bactrian Greco-Buddhist art, then a wind deity in China (as seen frescoes of the Tarim Basin; usually named Feng Bo/Feng Po—"Uncle Wind"—among various other names), and finally the Japanese Wind God Fūjin. The wind god kept its symbol, the windbag, and its disheveled appearance throughout this evolution.

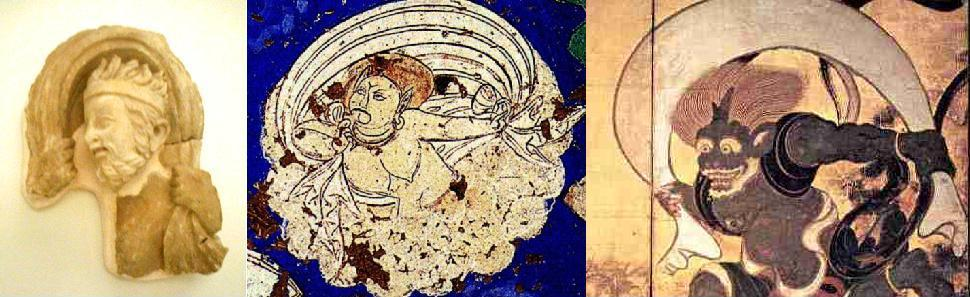
Iconographical evolution of the Wind God. Left: Greek wind God (Greco-Buddhist art of Gandhara), Hadda, 2nd century. Middle: Wind God from Kizil, Tarim Basin, 7th century. Right: Japanese Wind God Fujin, 17th century.

== See also ==
- Aeolus (Odyssey)
- Rudra, the Vedic wind or storm God
- Vayu, Hindu god of wind
