= Fukuoka Asian Art Museum =

Asian art museum in Fukuoka, Japan

- 福岡アジア美術館
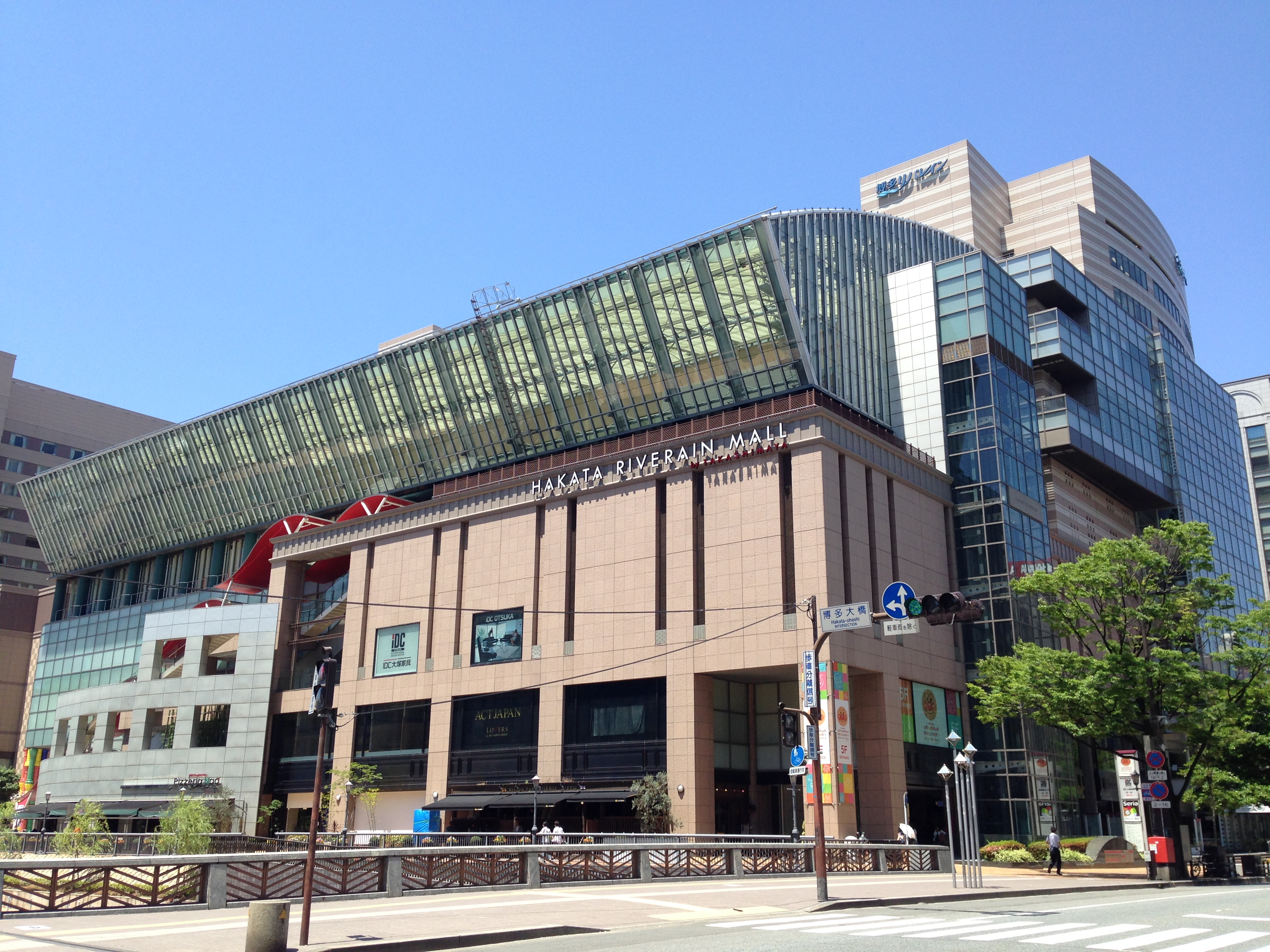
- Riverain Center Building (Floors 7 & 8)

General information
- Location: 3-1 Shimokawabata-machi, Hakata-ku, Fukuoka, Fukuoka Prefecture, Japan
- Coordinates: 33°35′43″N 130°24′21″E
- Opened: 6 March 1999

Website
- Official website

Fukuoka Asian Art Museum (福岡アジア美術館, Fukuoka Ajia Bijutsukan) is a museum of Asian art that opened in Hakata, Fukuoka, Fukuoka Prefecture, Japan in 1999. The collection of modern and contemporary art comprises some three thousand works from twenty-three countries. Majority of which was obtained through museum donations and gifts.

== History ==
Before the Fukuoka Asian Art Museum was formally founded, it was known as Fukuoka Art Museum. From 1979 up until 1994, every 5 years FAM (Fukuoka Art Museum) held an Asian art show. At this time contemporary Asian art had little to no appeal.

== See also ==
- Fukuoka Prefectural Museum of Art
- Fukuoka Oriental Ceramics Museum
- Fukuoka Art Museum
