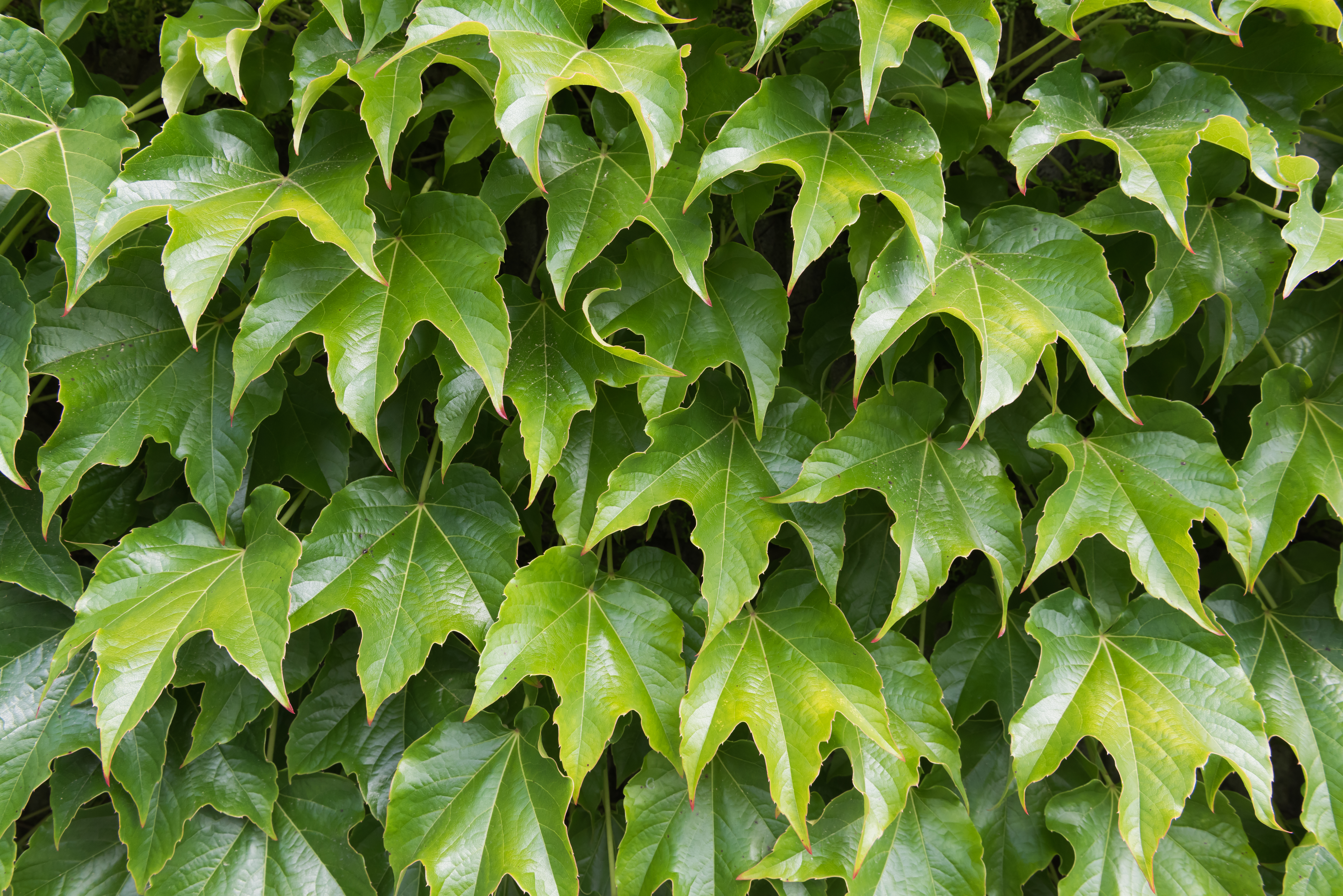
- Foliage on a cultivated plant

Scientific classification
- Kingdom: Plantae
- Clade: Tracheophytes
- Clade: Angiosperms
- Clade: Eudicots
- Clade: Rosids
- Order: Vitales
- Family: Vitaceae
- Genus: Parthenocissus
- Species: P. tricuspidata

Binomial name
- Parthenocissus tricuspidata (Siebold & Zucc.) Planch.

= Parthenocissus tricuspidata =

Species of grapevine

Parthenocissus tricuspidata

Chinese name
- Traditional Chinese: 爬牆虎
- Simplified Chinese: 爬墙虎
- Literal meaning: "wall-climbing tiger"
Transcriptions
Standard Mandarin
- Hanyu Pinyin: páqiáng hǔ

Japanese name
- Kanji: 蔦
- Kana: ツタ
Transcriptions
- Romanization: tsuta

Parthenocissus tricuspidata is a species of flowering plant in the grape family (Vitaceae) native to eastern Asia (Korea, Japan, and northern and eastern China), where it thrives in floodplain bushes, riverside woodland and moist mountain mixed forests. Although unrelated to true ivy, it is commonly known as Boston ivy, grape ivy, Japanese ivy, and also as Japanese creeper, and by the name woodbine (though the latter may refer to a number of different vine species).

The specific epithet tricuspidata means three-pointed, referring to the leaf shape. Boston ivy is readily distinguished from the Virginia creeper (Parthenocissus quinquefolia) by its simple leaves with pointed lobes (Virginia creeper leaves are divided into five separate leaflets).

== Description ==
It is a deciduous woody vine growing to 30 m tall or more given suitable support, attaching itself by means of numerous small branched tendrils tipped with sticky disks. The leaves are simple, palmately lobed with three lobes, occasionally unlobed or with five lobes, or sufficiently deeply lobed to be palmately compound with (usually) three leaflets; the leaves range from 5 to 22 cm across. The upper side of the leaf blade is shiny and bare, the underside is dull green and only has sparse hairs on the leaf veins. The leaf color is initially reddish green to bronze during budding, then orange-yellow to intense scarlet in autumn. Stipules are present.

=== Inflorescences ===
The greenish flowers are inconspicuous, greenish, in clusters; the inedible fruit is a small dark blue grape 5–10 mm diameter. The cup-shaped calyx is truncated. The hood-shaped petals are laid back. There are short stamens. The two-chambered, lobed ovary with a short style and capitate stigma is superior. There is a discus (circular fused anthers).

== Cultivation and uses ==
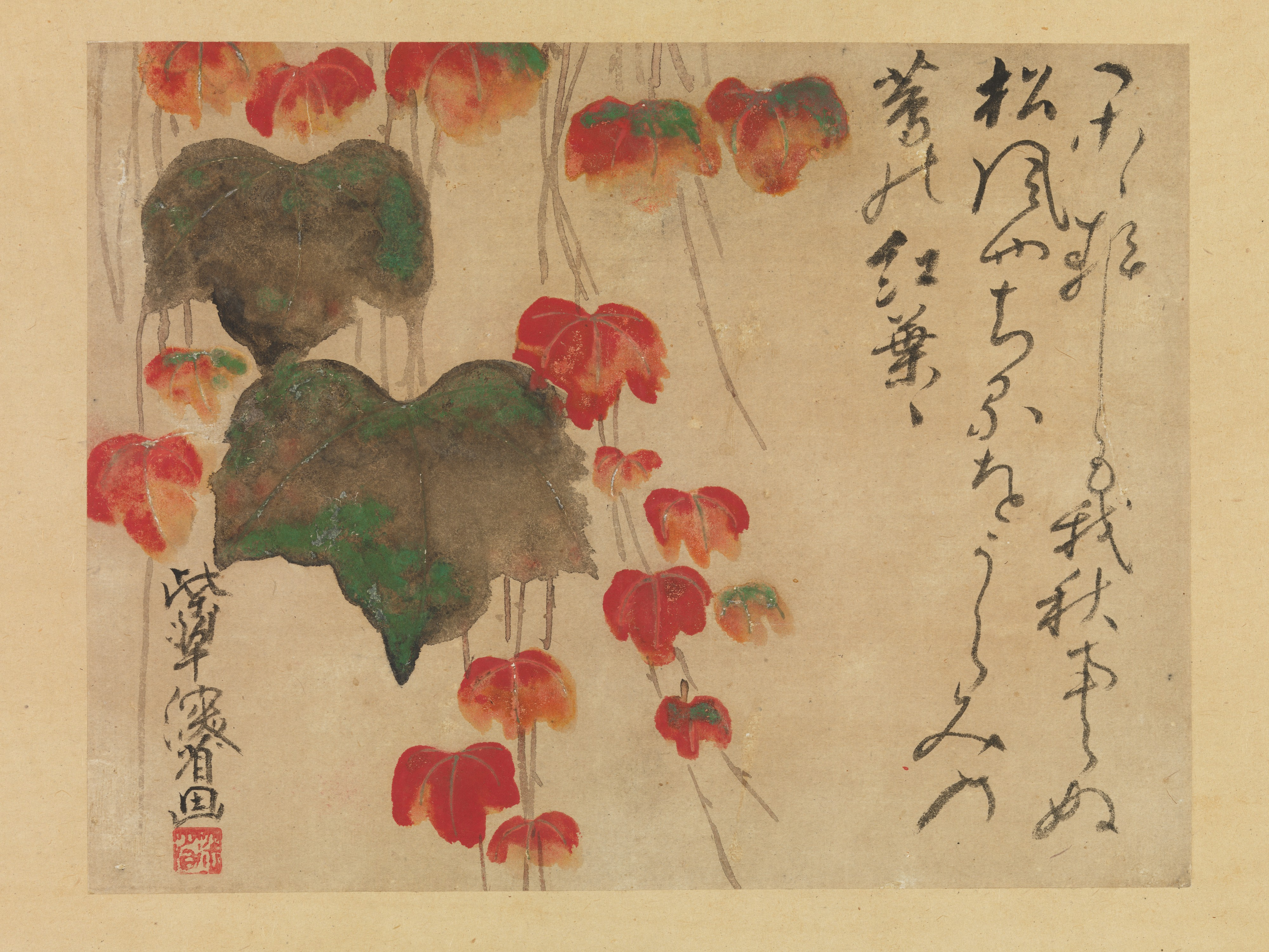
The subject of Autumn Ivy (蔦紅葉図) by potter and painter Ogata Kenzan is Parthenocissus tricuspidata

P. tricuspidata uses adhesive pads to attach to surfaces, allowing it to climb vertically up trees, walls, and other structures. Contact with a surface signals the adhesive pads to secrete mucilage through microscopic pores which dries and creates a robust adhesive bond. The ability of a single adhesive pad to support thousands of times their weight may be explored as a model for new biomimetic materials. In its native range, the vine has traditional medicinal uses (China, Korea) and as a culinary sweetener (Japan).

Both within and outside of East Asia, the plant is primarily used as an ornamental plant. Cultivars include 'Veitchii'. Like the related Virginia creeper, P. tricuspidata is widely grown to cover the façades of masonry buildings. This usage is actually economically important because, by shading walls during the summer, it can significantly reduce cooling costs. While it does not penetrate the building surface but merely attaches to it, nevertheless surface damage (such as paint scar) can occur from attempting to rip the plant from the wall.

In the U.S., Boston ivy is used on the brick outfield walls at Wrigley Field of baseball's Chicago Cubs along with Japanese bittersweet (Celastrus orbiculatus).

== Names and etymology ==
The mon of the Japanese Tōdō clan was a stylized Parthenocissus tricuspidata leaf

Parthenocissus is derived from the Greek terms parthenos (παρθένος; "maidenly, chaste, virgin") and kissos (κισσός; "vine") and means approximately "virgin ivy" (hence the common name of the related "Virginia creeper"). Tricuspidata, meaning approximately "with three points", comes from the Greek and Latin prefix tri ("three") and the Latin cuspidata ("tipped, pointed").

In Mandarin Chinese, the plant goes by a number of names, most commonly páqiánghǔ (爬墙虎, lit. "wall-climbing tiger"), but also páshānhǔ (爬山虎, lit. "mountain-climbing tiger", also refers to Hedera helix), dìjǐn (地錦, lit. "earth brocade", the name used in the Compendium of Materia Medica and the common name in Taiwan), tǔgǔténg (土鼓藤, lit. "dirt drum vine") and hóng pútáo téng (红葡萄藤, lit. "red grapevine").

In Taiwanese Hokkien, the vine also has several names, including chhiûⁿ-piah-tîn (牆壁藤, lit. "wall vine"), peh-soaⁿ-hó͘ (𬦰山虎, lit. "mountain-climbing tiger"), âng-koah (紅葛, lit. "red vine"), thô͘-kó͘-tîn (土鼓藤 lit. "dirt drum vine", a cognate with the Mandarin) and âng-kut-chôa (紅骨蛇, lit. "red-boned snake", a name that refers to at least five other plants as well).

In Korean, the plant is called damjaeng'ideonggul (담쟁이덩굴) in reference to it growing on walls. In contexts of Korean traditional medicine, it is known as jigeum (지금/地錦, a cognate with the Mandarin Chinese dìjǐn from the Compendium of Materia Medica, as well as other names such as nakseok (낙석/絡石), jangchundeung (장춘등/長春藤), pasanho (파산호/爬山虎), naman (나만/蘿蔓) and yongninbyeongnyeo (용린벽려/龍鱗薜荔).

In Japanese, the vine is known usually as tsuta (蔦; つた;ツタ), but also as amazura (甘葛; あまづら; アマヅラ), lit. "sweet vine" (Note: Amazura refers often to syrup made from the vine (甘葛煎; あまづらせん; amazura-sen); the same kanji in Mandarin Chinese refer to Vitis saccharifera.) natsuzuta (夏蔦; なつづた; ナツヅタ), or rarely jinishiki (地錦; じにしき;ジニシキ).

In Okinawan, the vine is called cita (蔦; つぃた), while in the Taiwanese indigenous language Paiwan it is tiyaroromao.

== Gallery ==
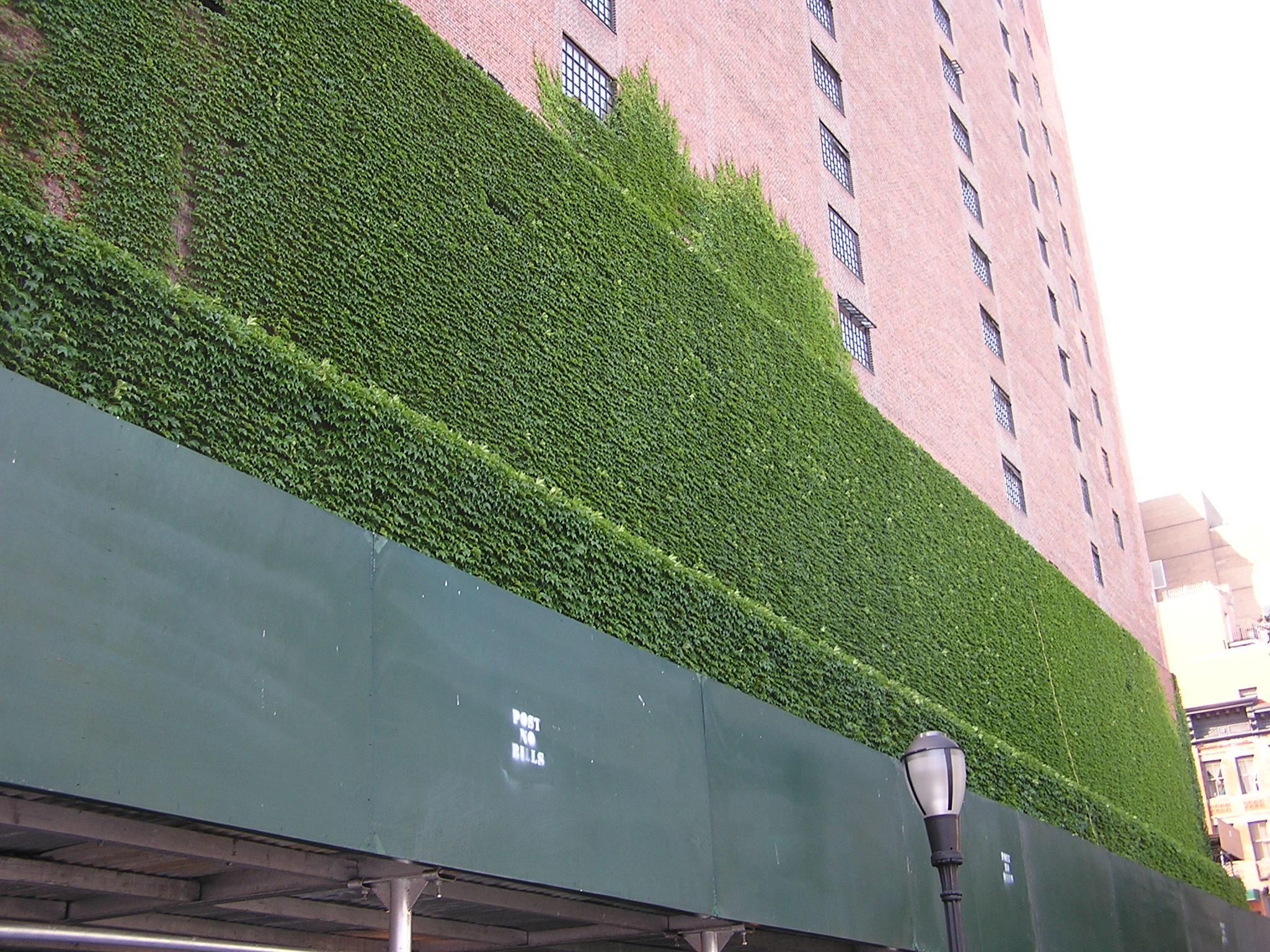
Boston ivy covering the exterior of an apartment building near Kips Bay, Manhattan

Boston ivy covering a building on the University of Chicago campus

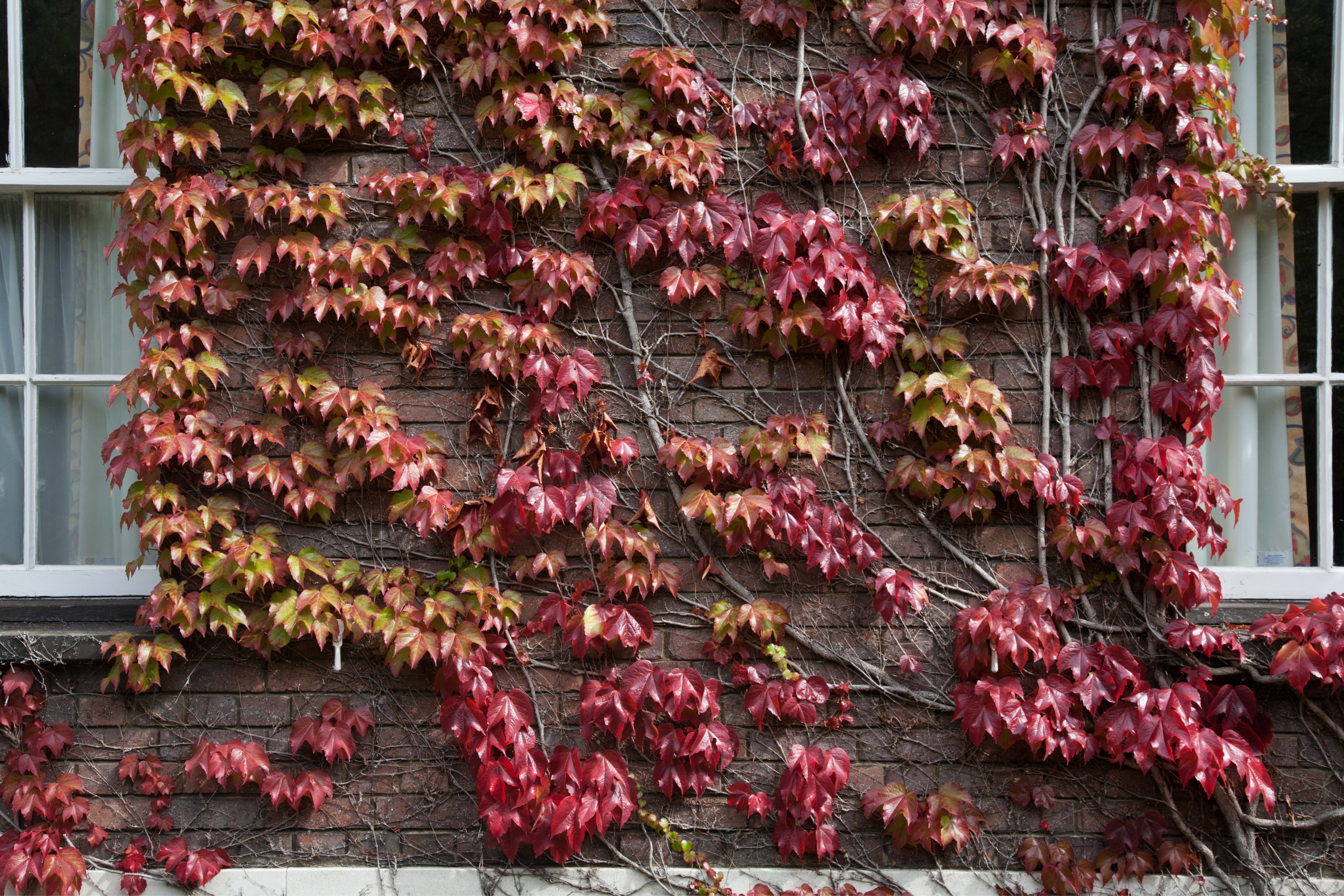
Japanese creeper growing over a brick wall at the University of Cambridge.

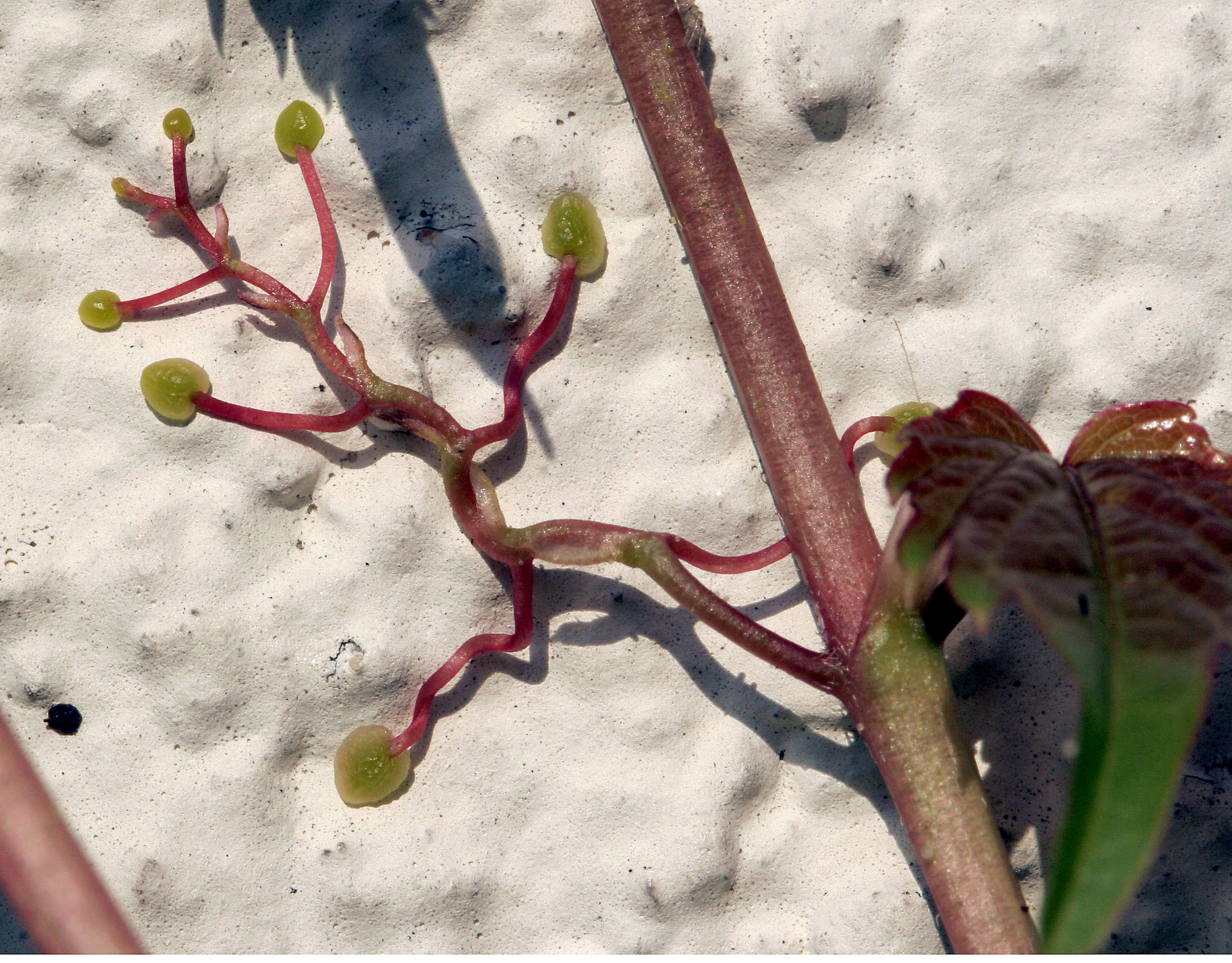
Sticky disks of Parthenocissus tricuspidata

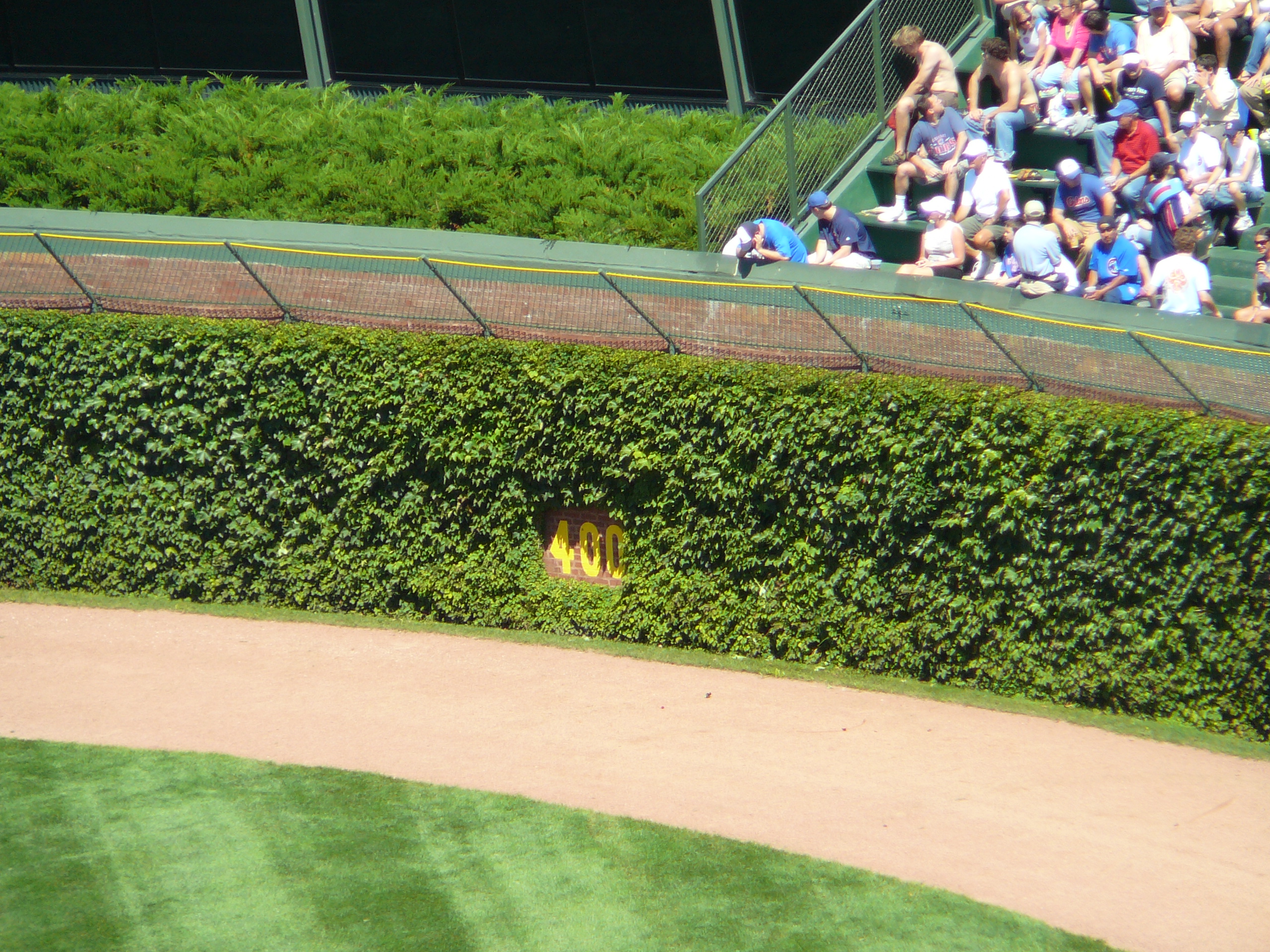
Wrigley Field's famous ivy covered outfield walls.

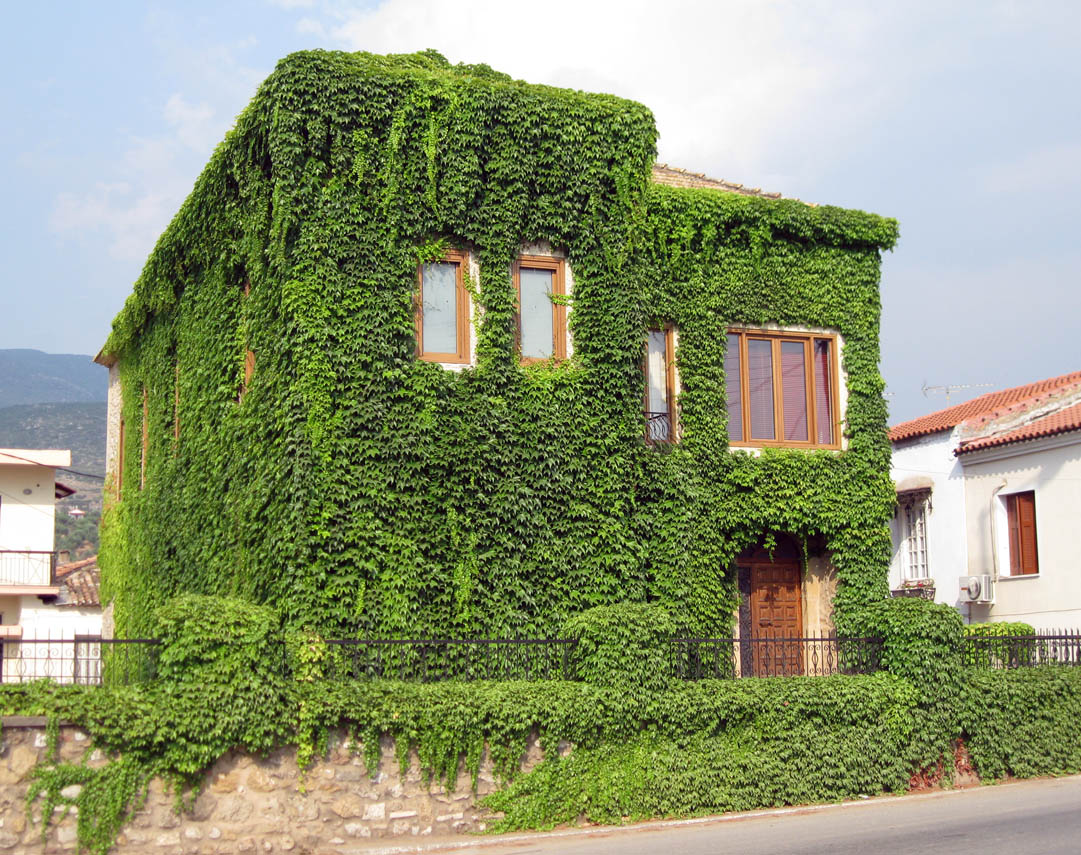
Stone house covered with Boston ivy in Kalamata

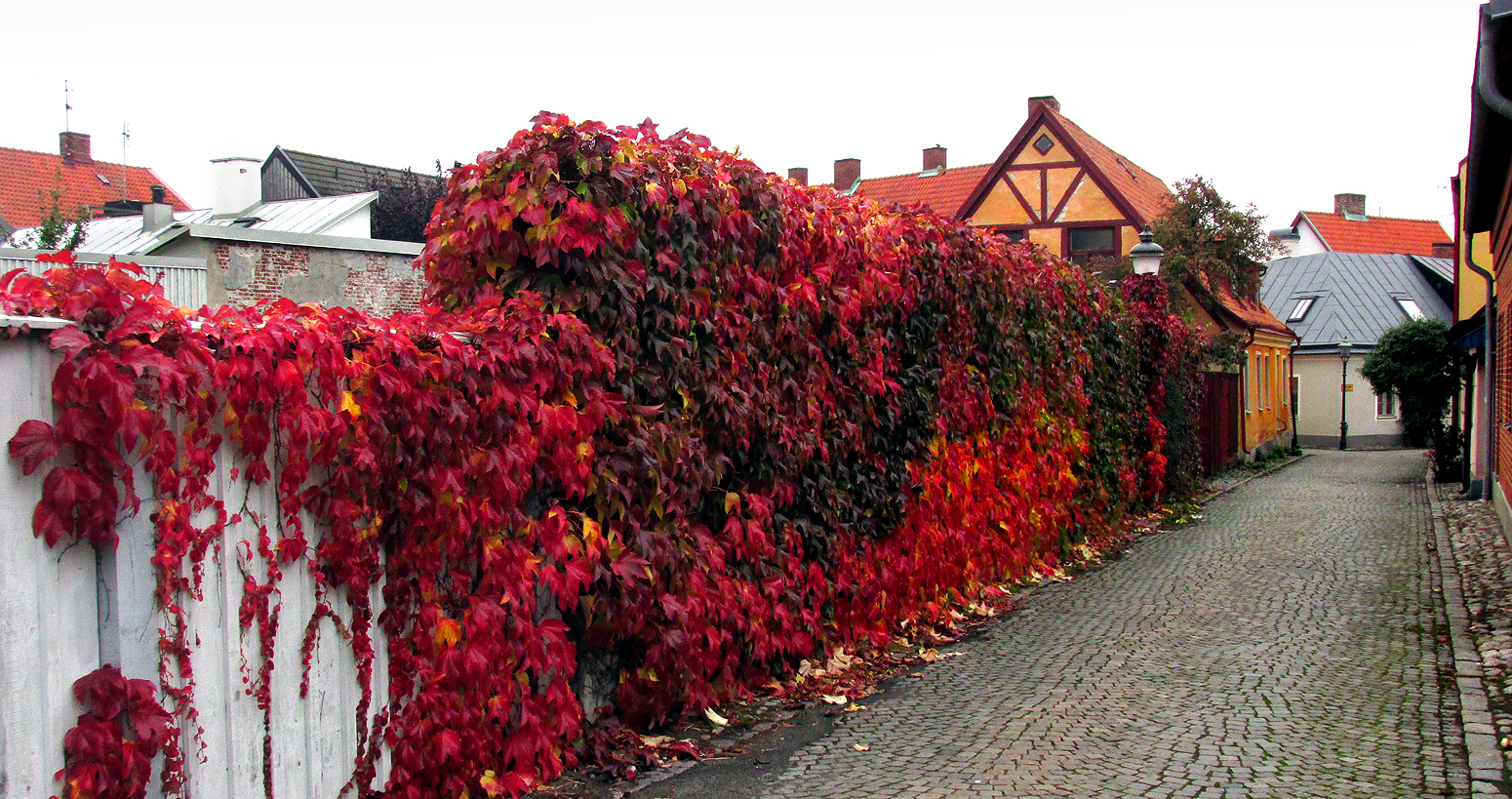
Boston ivy covering a wall. Ystad/Sweden.

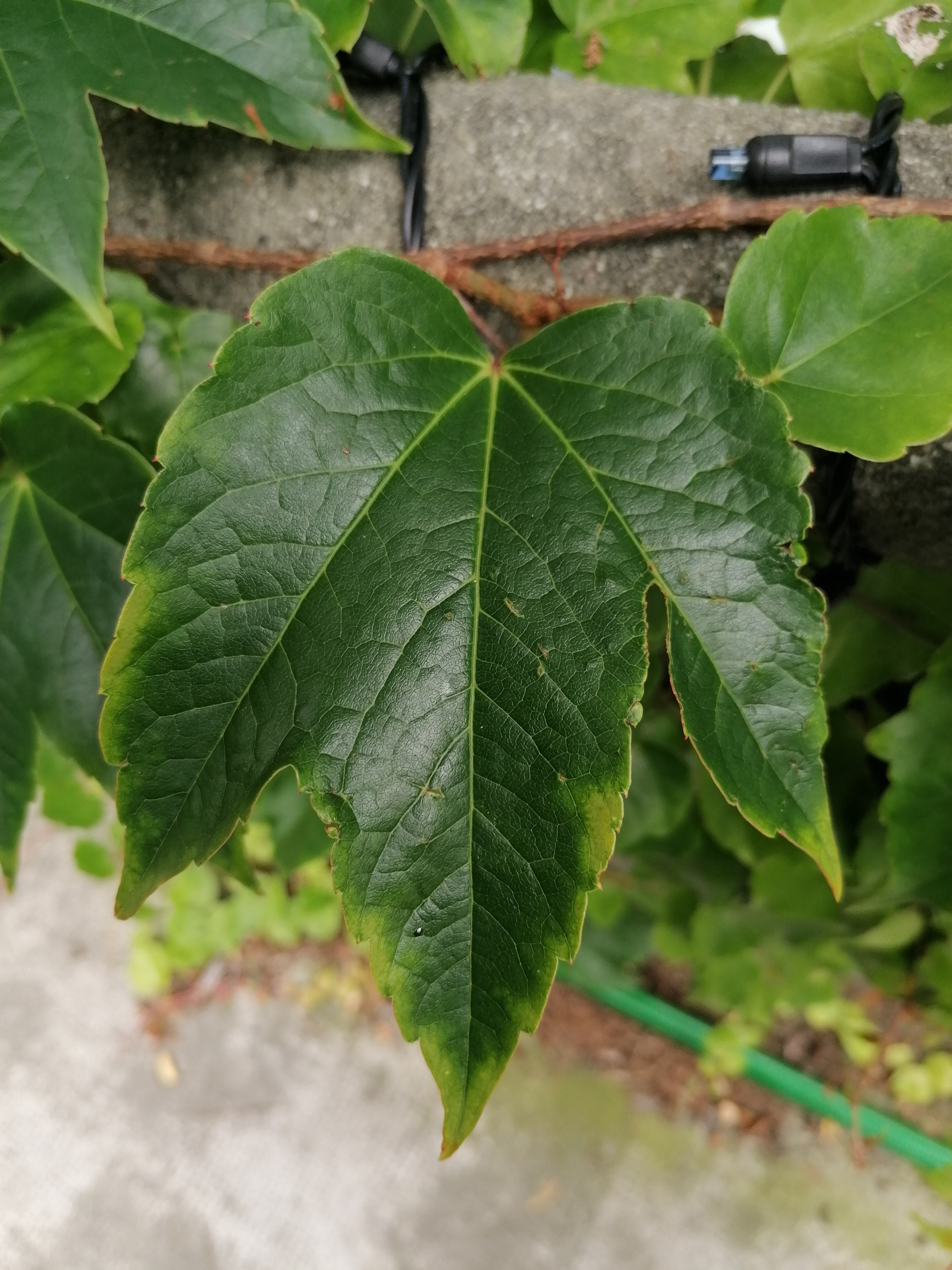
Leaf close-up
