= List of cultural properties of Japan – paintings (Fukuoka Prefecture) =

This list is of the cultural properties of Japan designated in the category of paintings (絵画, kaiga) for the Prefecture of Fukuoka.

== National Cultural Properties ==
As of 1 July 2019, twenty-two Important Cultural Properties have been designated (including one *National Treasure), being of national significance.

| Property | Date | Municipality | Ownership | Comments | Image | Dimensions | Coordinates | Ref. |
|---|---|---|---|---|---|---|---|---|
| *Zhou Dunyi Appreciating Lotuses, ink and light colours on paper, by Kanō Masanobu 紙本墨画淡彩周茂叔愛蓮図〈狩野正信筆／〉 shihon bokuga tansai Shū Oshuku airen zu (Kanō Masanobu hitsu) | Muromachi period | Dazaifu | National Institutes for Cultural Heritage (kept at Kyushu National Museum) | | | 84.5 centimetres (33.3 in) by 33.0 centimetres (13.0 in) | 35°43′12″N 139°46′32″E | |
| Kannon Mandala, colour on silk 絹本著色観音曼荼羅図 kenpon chakushoku Kannon mandara zu | 941 (Later Jin) | | | | | | | |
| Kankōji Engi, colour on silk 絹本著色観興寺縁起 kenpon chakushoku Kankōji engi | Kamakura period | Kyoto | Kankō-ji (観興寺) (kept at Kyoto National Museum) | two scrolls; an inscription on the wooden box in which they are stored documents repair work in 1662 | | 160 centimetres (5 ft 3 in) by 114 centimetres (3 ft 9 in) | 34°59′24″N 135°46′23″E | |
| Tamadare Miya Engi, colour on silk 絹本著色玉垂宮縁起 kenpon chakushoku Tamadare Miya engi | 1370 | Kyoto | Tamadare Miya (玉垂宮) (kept at Kyoto National Museum) | two scrolls; an inscription on the lid of the wooden box in which they are stored identifies it as the "box for the Kōra Byōin Tamadare Miya Engi" (高良廟院玉垂宮縁起箱); a second inscription on the back of the lid reads 筑後国三瀦庄、鎮守高良御廟院大善寺玉垂宮縁起事、右縁起者正法明如来降生之霊場、玉垂大菩薩垂迹之社壇也、然、後村上天皇御子当今御治世征西将軍鎮西宮御座之時経奏聞終其功者也、草創之昔雖有画像之縁起、依令破損、憑貴賎合力、所令書改也依状如件 箱作者 永俊; and a third, on the bottom of the box, dates the paintings to the first year of the Kentoku era (建徳元季庚戌十二月十三日 大勧進 阿闍梨道意 大檀那肥前三郎 武安並衆徒等 筆者権律師永快) | | 184 centimetres (6 ft 0 in) by 130 centimetres (4 ft 3 in) | 34°59′24″N 135°46′23″E | |
| Kōhō Dangai Chūbō Oshō, colour on silk 絹本著色高峰断崖中峰和尚像〈／比丘文康ノ賛アリ〉 kenpon chakushoku Kōhō Dangai Chūbō oshō zō (biku Fumiyasu no san ari) | Yuan dynasty | Fukuoka | Shōfuku-ji | | | 90.7 centimetres (2 ft 11.7 in) by 44.6 centimetres (1 ft 5.6 in) | 33°35′50″N 130°24′52″E | |
| Shaka Triad, colour on silk 絹本著色釈迦三尊像 kenpon chakushoku Shaka sanzon zō | Kamakura period | Dazaifu | Bairin-ji (kept at Kyushu National Museum) | | | 103.8 centimetres (40.9 in) by 51.5 centimetres (20.3 in) | 33°31′06″N 130°32′20″E | |
| Pure Land Mandala, colour on silk 絹本著色浄土曼荼羅図 kenpon chakushoku jōdo mandala zu | Kamakura period | Dazaifu | National Institutes for Cultural Heritage (kept at the Kyushu National Museum) | an inscription on the old mounting documents repair work in 1435; formerly owned by Enman-in (円満院) in Ōtsu | | 128.5 centimetres (50.6 in) by 123.6 centimetres (48.7 in) | 33°31′06″N 130°32′20″E | |
| Six Patriarchs, colour on silk 絹本著色禅家六祖像 kenpon chakushoku Zen-ka rokuso zō | Kamakura period | Fukuoka | Jōten-ji | six scrolls | | 72.7 centimetres (28.6 in) by 36.3 centimetres (14.3 in) | 33°35′43″N 130°25′01″E | |
| Daiō Kokushi, colour on silk 絹本著色大応国師像 kenpon chakushoku Daiō Kokushi zō | 1307 | Fukuoka | Kōtoku-ji (興徳寺) | | | 99.9 centimetres (39.3 in) by 55.4 centimetres (21.8 in) | 33°35′15″N 130°19′12″E | |
| Daikaku Zenji, colour on silk 絹本著色大覚禅師像 kenpon chakushoku Daikaku zenji zō | Kamakura period | Fukuoka | Shōfuku-ji (勝福寺) | | | 112.8 centimetres (44.4 in) by 59.69 centimetres (23.50 in) | 33°36′20″N 130°15′35″E | |
| Daikan Zenji, colour on silk 本著色大鑑禅師像 kenpon chakushoku Daikan zenji zō | 1198 | Fukuoka | Shōfuku-ji | portrait of the sixth Chan patriarch | | 115.3 centimetres (45.4 in) by 73.1 centimetres (28.8 in) | 33°35′50″N 130°24′52″E | |
| Flower Baskets, colour on silk 紙本著色花篭図〈尾形乾山筆／〉 shihon chakushoku hanakago-zu (Ogata Kenzan hitsu) | Edo period | Fukuoka | Fukuoka City (kept at the Fukuoka Art Museum) | the poem (花といへば 千種ながらに あだならぬ 色香にうつる 野辺の露かな) is by Sanjōnishi Sanetaka (三条西実隆); by Ogata Kenzan | | 112.5 centimetres (3 ft 8.3 in) by 49.2 centimetres (1 ft 7.4 in) | 33°35′02″N 130°22′47″E | |
| Western Manners and Customs, six-fold byōbu 紙本著色泰西風俗図〈／六曲屏風〉 shihon chakushoku taisei fūzoku zu (rokkyoku byōbu) | Momoyama period | Fukuoka | Fukuoka City (kept at the Fukuoka Art Museum) | | | 97.0 centimetres (3 ft 2.2 in) by 270.5 centimetres (8 ft 10.5 in) | 33°35′02″N 130°22′47″E | |
| Hell Scroll, colour on paper 紙本著色地獄草紙断簡〈／（勘当の鬼）〉 shihon chakushoku jigoku zōshi dankan (kandō-no-oni) | Kamakura period | Fukuoka | Fukuoka City (kept at the Fukuoka Art Museum) | | | 54.0 centimetres (21.3 in) by 26.0 centimetres (10.2 in) | 33°35′02″N 130°22′47″E | |
| Scroll of Diseases and Deformities (Corpulent Woman), colour on paper 紙本著色病草紙（肥満女）〈残闕／〉 shihon chakushoku yamai zōshi (himan onna) (zanketsu) | Kamakura period | Fukuoka | Fukuoka City (kept at the Fukuoka Art Museum) | the text reads "around Shichijō in Kyoto there was a woman who loaned money at exorbitant rates. Her family was wealthy and after years of gluttony she became so fat that she could hardly walk. Even with the help of her female attendants, just walking would make her sweat and great was her suffering." | | 45.1 centimetres (17.8 in) by 25.3 centimetres (10.0 in) | 33°35′02″N 130°22′47″E | |
| Scenes in and around the Capital, six-fold byōbu 紙本著色洛中洛外図〈六曲屏風〉 shihon chakushoku rakuchū rakugai zu (rokkyoku byōbu) | Momoyama period | Fukuoka | Fukuoka City (kept at the Fukuoka City Museum) | pair of screens attributed to Kanō Takanobu (狩野孝信) | | 265.2 centimetres (8 ft 8.4 in) by 81.3 centimetres (2 ft 8.0 in) | 33°35′23″N 130°21′11″E | |
| Fifth Patriarch with Load and Plough, ink on paper 紙本墨画五祖荷鋤図 shihon bokuga goso kajo zu | Yuan dynasty | Fukuoka | Fukuoka City (kept at the Fukuoka Art Museum) | alternatively dated to the Southern Song; portrait of the Chinese priest Kōnin | | 86.3 centimetres (34.0 in) by 31.3 centimetres (12.3 in) | 33°35′02″N 130°22′47″E | |
| Landscapes, ink and light colour on paper 紙本墨画淡彩山水図〈狩野正信筆／〉 shihon bokuga tansai sansui zu (Kanō Masanobu hitsu) | Muromachi period | Dazaifu | National Institutes for Cultural Heritage (kept at the Kyushu National Museum) | two scrolls; by Kanō Masanobu | | 69.0 centimetres (27.2 in) by 38.8 centimetres (15.3 in) | 33°31′06″N 130°32′20″E | |
| Daily Exorcisms, ink on paper, by Katsushika Hokusai 紙本墨画日新除魔図（葛飾北斎筆／） shihon bokuga nisshin zu (Katsushika Hokusai hitsu) | Edo period | Dazaifu | National Institutes for Cultural Heritage (kept at the Kyushu National Museum) | 219 items | | | 33°31′06″N 130°32′20″E | |
| Hotei, ink on paper 紙本墨画布袋図 shihon bokuga Hotei zu | Yuan dynasty | Dazaifu | National Institutes for Cultural Heritage (kept at the Kyushu National Museum) | | | | 33°31′06″N 130°32′20″E | |
| Hotei, ink on paper 紙本墨画布袋図〈足利義持筆／〉 shihon bokuga Hotei zu (Ashikaga Yoshimochi hitsu) | Muromachi period | Fukuoka | Fukuoka City (kept at the Fukuoka Art Museum) | by Ashikaga Yoshimochi | | 31.0 centimetres (1 ft 0.2 in) by 56.0 centimetres (1 ft 10.0 in) | 33°35′02″N 130°22′47″E | |
| Deva, colour on a wooden panel 板絵著色天部像（醍醐寺五重塔壁画断片） ita-e chakushoku tenbu zō (Daigoji gojūnotō hekiga danpen) | 951 | Fukuoka | Fukuoka City (kept at the Fukuoka Art Museum) | mural fragment from the Daigo-ji five-storey pagoda | | 37.9 centimetres (1 ft 2.9 in) by 24.0 centimetres (9.4 in) | 33°35′02″N 130°22′47″E | |

== Prefectural Cultural Properties ==
As of 1 May 2019, twenty-two properties have been designated at a prefectural level.

| Property | Date | Municipality | Ownership | Comments | Image | Dimensions | Coordinates | Ref. |
|---|---|---|---|---|---|---|---|---|
| Sokuhi, colour on paper 紙本著色即非画像 喜多元規筆 shihon chakushoku Sokuhi gazō Kita Genki hitsu | 1671, 1688 | Kitakyushu | Fukuju-ji (kept at Kitakyushu Museum of Natural History & Human History) | two scrolls, the larger dating to 1671 and smaller to 1688; by Kita Genki (喜多元規) | | | 33°52′14″N 130°54′10″E | for all refs see |
| Hōun, colour on paper 紙本著色法雲画像 喜多元規筆 shihon chakushoku Hōun gazō Kita Genki hitsu | c.1661-1710 | Kitakyushu | Fukuju-ji (kept at Kitakyushu Museum of Natural History & Human History) | by Kita Genki (喜多元規) | | | 33°52′14″N 130°54′10″E | |
| Mokuan, colour on paper 紙本著色木庵画像 喜多元規筆 shihon chakushoku Mokuan gazō Kita Genki hitsu | c.1661-1710 | Kitakyushu | Fukuju-ji (kept at Kitakyushu Museum of Natural History & Human History) | by Kita Genki (喜多元規) | | | 33°52′14″N 130°54′10″E | |
| Ingen, colour on paper 紙本著色隠元画像 喜多元規筆 shihon chakushoku Mokuan gazō Kita Genki hitsu | c.1661-1710 | Kitakyushu | Fukuju-ji (kept at Kitakyushu Museum of Natural History & Human History) | by Kita Genki (喜多元規) | | | 33°52′14″N 130°54′10″E | |
| Eiteiin, colour on silk 絹本著色永貞院画像 喜多元規筆 kenpon chakushoku Eiteiin gazō Kita Genki hitsu | c.1661-1710 | Kitakyushu | Fukuju-ji (kept at Kitakyushu Museum of Natural History & Human History) | by Kita Genki (喜多元規) | | | 33°52′14″N 130°54′10″E | |
| Twelve Devas, colour on silk 絹本著色十二天像 kenpon chakushoku jūni ten zō | Muromachi period | Fukuoka | Fukuoka City (kept at Fukuoka Art Museum) | | | | 33°35′02″N 130°22′47″E | |
| Ten Kings of Hell, colour on silk 絹本著色十王図 kenpon chakushoku jūō zu | Kamakura period | Ogōri | Ogōri City (kept at Kyushu Historical Museum) | ten scrolls | | | 33°26′21″N 130°33′30″E | |
| Kuroda Josui, colour on silk 絹本著色黒田如水像 kenpon chakushoku Kuroda Josui zō | | Fukuoka | Sōfuku-ji | | | | 33°36′21″N 130°24′49″E | |
| Kuroda Nagamasa, colour on paper 紙本著色黒田長政像 shihon chakushoku Kuroda Nagamasa zō | | Fukuoka | Sōfuku-ji | | | | 33°36′21″N 130°24′49″E | |
| Shaka Coming Forth from the Mountains, ink on paper 紙本墨画出山釈迦像 shihon bokuga shussan Shaka zō | | Fukuoka | Sōfuku-ji | | | | 33°36′21″N 130°24′49″E | |
| Hakozaki Hachimangū Engi 箱崎八幡宮縁起; Hakozaki Hachimangū engi | Muromachi period | Fukuoka | Hakozaki Shrine | | | | 33°36′52″N 130°25′24″E | |
| Chikugo Province Kitano Tenjin Engi 筑後国北野天神縁起; Chikugo no Kuni Kitano Tenjin engi | Edo period | Kurume | Kitano Tenmangū (北野天満宮) | three scrolls | | | 33°20′37″N 130°35′05″E | |
| Kōra Taisha Engi, colour on silk 絹本著色高良大社縁起 kenpon chakushoku Kōra Taisha engi | Momoyama/early Edo period | Kurume | Kōra Taisha | pair of scrolls | | | 33°18′06″N 130°33′57″E | |
| Honchō Soshi Ekotoba, colour on paper 紙本著色本朝祖師伝絵詞 shihon chakushoku Honchō Soshi den-ekotoba | 1237 | Kurume | Zendō-ji (善導寺) | | | | 33°19′48″N 130°36′14″E | |
| Buzō-ji Engi, colour on paper 紙本著色武蔵寺縁起 shihon chakushoku Buzōji engi | mid-Edo period | Chikushino | Buzō-ji (武蔵寺) (kept at Chikushino City History Museum (筑紫野市歴史博物館)) | | | | 33°29′26″N 130°31′09″E | |
| Thirty-Six Immortals of Poetry, wooden panels 三十六歌仙扁額 sanjūrokkasen hengaku | Momoyama to Edo period | Munakata | Munakata Taisha | 173 panels (Kodai no Kimi pictured) | | | 33°49′51″N 130°30′55″E | |
| Ippen Shōnin, colour on silk 絹本著色一遍上人画像 kenpon chakushoku Ippen Shōnin gazō | Muromachi period | Dazaifu | Fukuoka Prefecture (kept at Kyushu National Museum) | | | | 33°31′06″N 130°32′20″E | |
| Kitano Tenjin Engi 北野天神縁起; Kitano Tenjin engi | 1619 | Dazaifu | Dazaifu Tenman-gū | three scrolls | | | 33°31′17″N 130°32′06″E | |
| Kuroda Josui, colour on paper 紙本著色黒田如水像 shihon chakushoku Kuroda Josui zō | | Asakura | Ensei-ji (円清寺) | | | | 33°22′08″N 130°46′23″E | |
| Kuroda Josui, colour on paper 紙本著色黒田如水像 shihon chakushoku Kuroda Josui zō | | Okagaki | Ryūshō-ji (龍昌寺) | | | | 33°50′50″N 130°35′51″E | |
| Inoue Suō, colour on paper 紙本著色井上周防像 附 箱一箇 関係文書 三通 shihon chakushoku Inoue Suō zō | | Okagaki | Ryūshō-ji (龍昌寺) | designation includes a case and three volumes of related documents | | | 33°50′50″N 130°35′51″E | |
| Taima Mandala, colour on silk 絹本著色当麻曼荼羅図 kenpon chakushoku Taima mandara zu | | Ogōri | Ogōri City (kept at Kyushu Historical Museum) | | | | 33°26′21″N 130°33′30″E | |

== Municipal Cultural Properties ==
As of 1 May 2015, fifty-one properties have been designated at a municipal level.

== See also ==
- Cultural Properties of Japan
- List of National Treasures of Japan (paintings)
- Japanese painting
- List of Historic Sites of Japan (Fukuoka)
