= Tatsuichi Horikiri =

Horikiri Tatsuichi (堀切辰一) (b.1925-d.2019) was a Japanese collector, anthropologist and independent scholar. Horikiri developed an interest in boro (literally translated as "rags"), and throughout his research collected 3,500 items of working class clothing and textiles from across Japan. He believed clothing has kokoro, "heart," "feeling," or in other words hold memories of human history that may otherwise be forgotten. Horikiri's work is praised by historians and anthropologists of Japan for its nuance and authenticity in recording working class histories, especially those from the past century, through clothing.

Born in Kagoshima, Japan in 1925, Horikiri experienced the majority of his later childhood with the country at war, first with the outbreak of the Second Sino-Japanese War in 1937, and then the Pacific War until 1945. At seventeen, after graduating high school in 1938, Horikiri was hired by Kahoku Kōtsū (Northern China Transport Company). He was shortly afterwards conscripted by the Japanese army and sent to the front in China, not returning to Japan until 1946. Once the war ended, Horikiri continued to work in construction until his retirement in 1980. It was during his work travels that he encountered clothing and textiles of shomin (ordinary/working-class people) and began to build his collection.

Horikiri later worked at Kitakyushu Museum of Natural History and Human History as a research fellow, and this is also where the majority of his collection is held together under the title Boro ranru (襤褸らんる). He began donating his collection to the museum from around 1993.

One of his most poignant works, Nuno no Inochi: Hito no Kokoro, Kurashi Tsutaete, was first published as serialised essays in Nishinippon and Akahata, and also in the magazine Senshoku a, before being consolidated together into book format. Horikiri expanded on this work and gave impetus to publish a new edition in 2004. In 2016, this newer edition was translated and edited by Rieko Wagoner with the title "The Stories Clothes Tell: Voices of Working-Class Japan" and published in 2016 with the publisher Rowman & Littlefield as part of Mark Selden's Asian Voices series.

== Publications ==
[This is a non-exhaustive list].

- 襤褸達の遍歴 (Ranrutachi no henrekii) [Journey of Scrap Clothes], (Kyōtō: Senshoku to Seikatsu-sha, 1987).
- 布のいのち――人の心、くらし伝えて (Nuno no inochi: Hito no kokoro, kurashi tsutaete), (Tōkyō: Shin Nihon Shuppansha, 1990 (reprinted in 2004)).
- 布が語る戦争 (Nuno ga kataru sensō), (Tōkyō: Shin Nihon Shuppansha, 1996).
- 布の記憶 : 庶民が織りなす哀と愛 (Nuno no kioku: Shomin ga orinasu ai to ai), (Tōkyō: Shinkaiyaku Shuppansha, 2003).
- Horikiri Tatsuichi, The Stories Clothes Tell: Voices of Working-Class Japan. Edited and translated by Rieko Wagoner. (Lanham: Rowman & Littlefield, 2016).

=== Related work ===
- 襤褸 : 堀切辰一コレクション時代布目録（Ranru: Horikiri Tatsuichi korekushon jidai nuno mokuroku) catalogue edited by Kitakyushu Museum of Natural History & Human History, 2014.
