= Fukuoka Prefectural Museum of Art =

- 福岡県立美術館
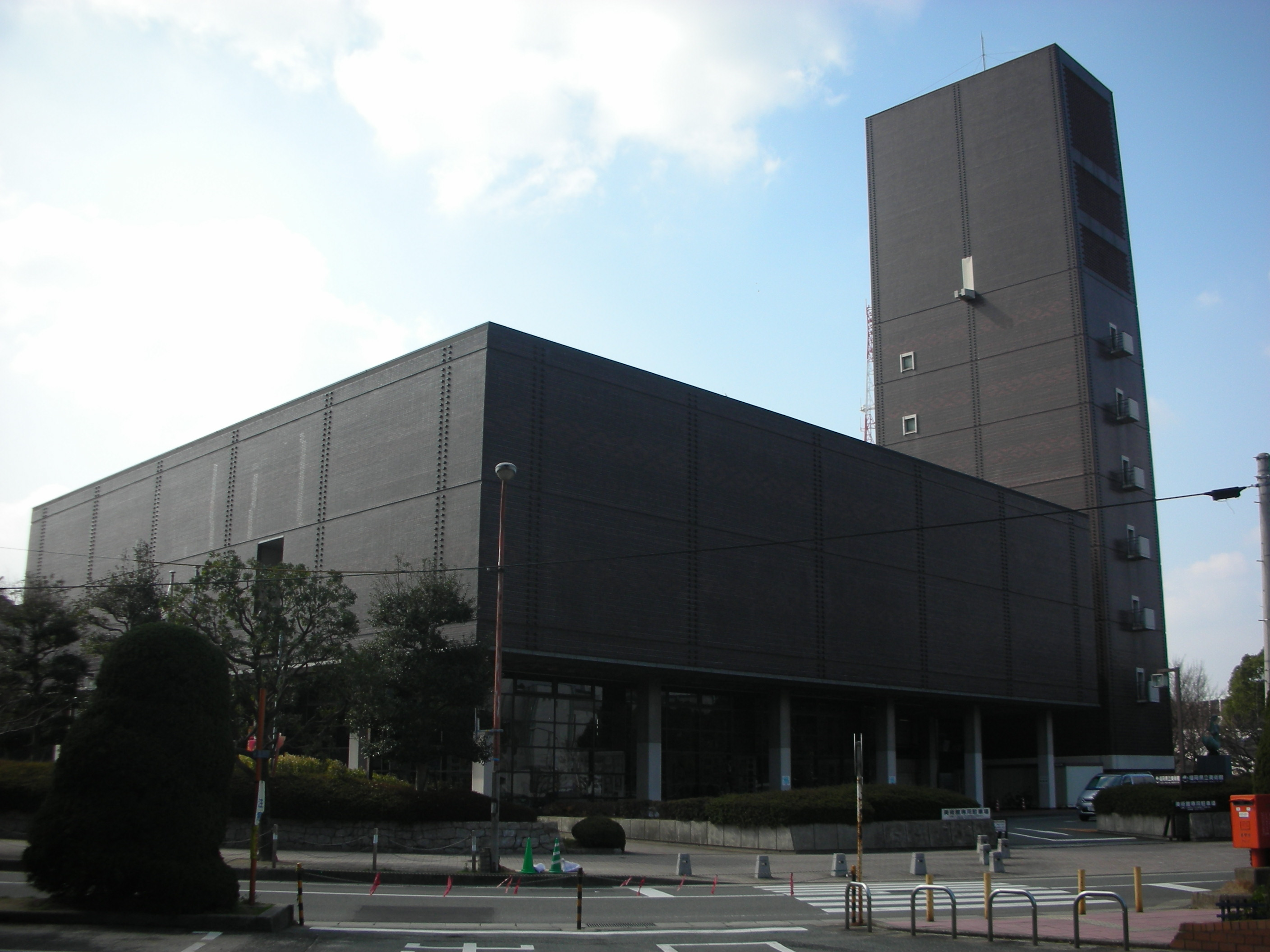
- Interactive map of the Fukuoka Prefectural Museum of Art area

General information
- Location: 5-2-1 Tenjin, Chūō-ku, Fukuoka, Fukuoka Prefecture, Japan
- Coordinates: 33°35′50″N 130°23′56″E
- Opened: 3 November 1985

Website
- fukuoka-kenbi.jp

Fukuoka Prefectural Museum of Art (福岡県立美術館, Fukuoka kenritsu bijutsukan) opened in Fukuoka, Japan, in 1985. The collection focuses upon artists from Fukuoka Prefecture and Kyūshū more generally, and includes works by Koga Harue. The Museum's precursor, the Fukuoka Prefectural Cultural Hall (福岡県文化会館), which combined art museum with library, opened on 3 November 1964.

== See also ==
- Fukuoka Art Museum
- List of Cultural Properties of Japan - paintings (Fukuoka)
