= Fukuoka City Museum =

- 福岡市博物館
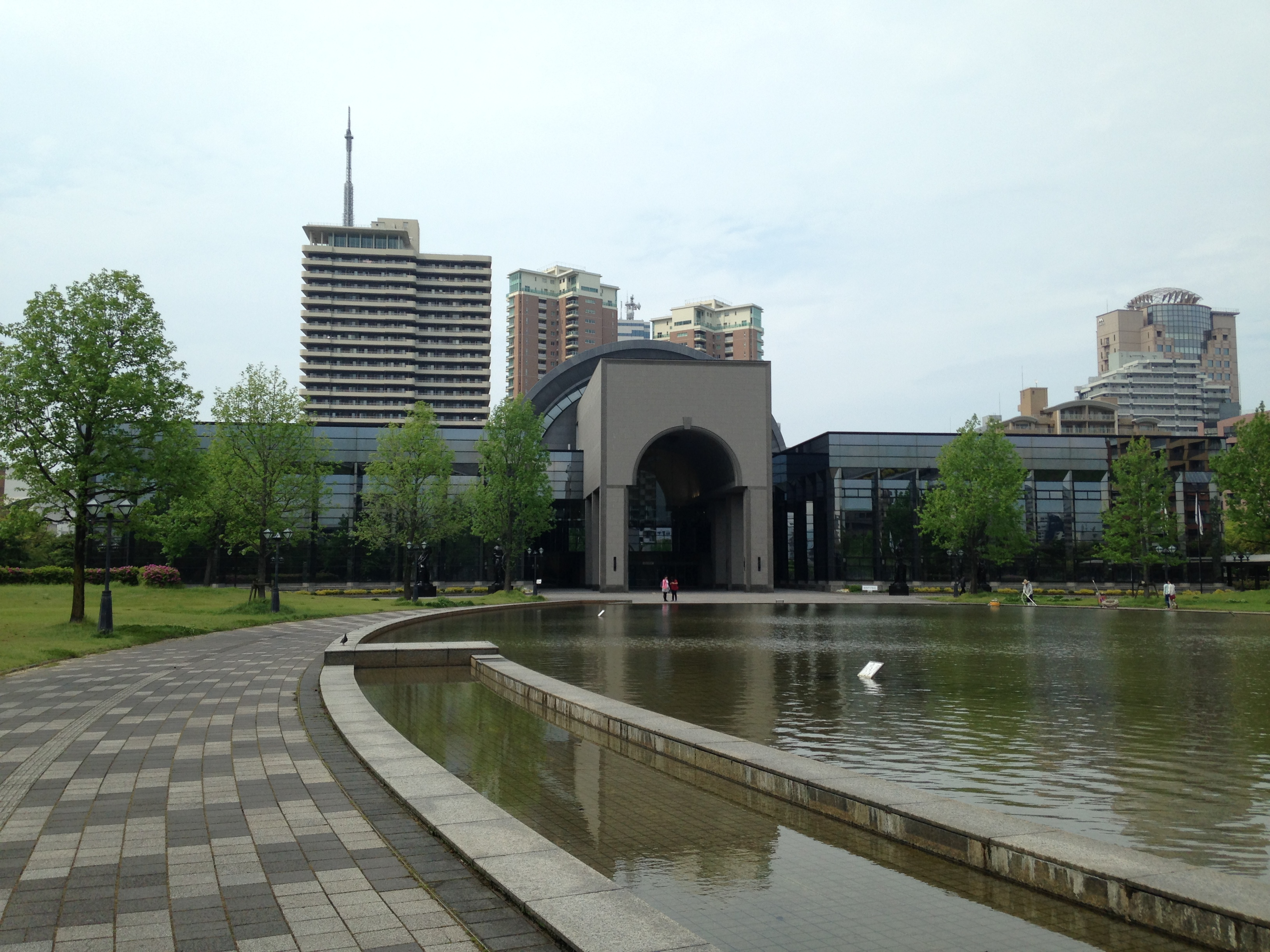
- Interactive map of the Fukuoka City Museum area

General information
- Location: 3-1-1 Momochihama, Sawara-ku, Fukuoka, Fukuoka Prefecture, Japan
- Coordinates: 33°35′23″N 130°21′11″E
- Opened: October 1990

Website
- Official website

Fukuoka City Museum (福岡市博物館, Fukuoka-shi hakubutsukan) opened in Fukuoka, Japan, in 1990. The permanent exhibition, which tells the history of Fukuoka, is arranged in eleven sections, including those focussing upon the King of Na gold seal (National Treasure), the Kuroda clan, and the Hakata Gion Yamakasa.

== See also ==
- Fukuoka Art Museum
- List of Cultural Properties of Japan - paintings (Fukuoka)
