= Kyushu Ceramic Museum =

Museum in Japan

Coordinates: 33°11′20″N 129°53′48″E

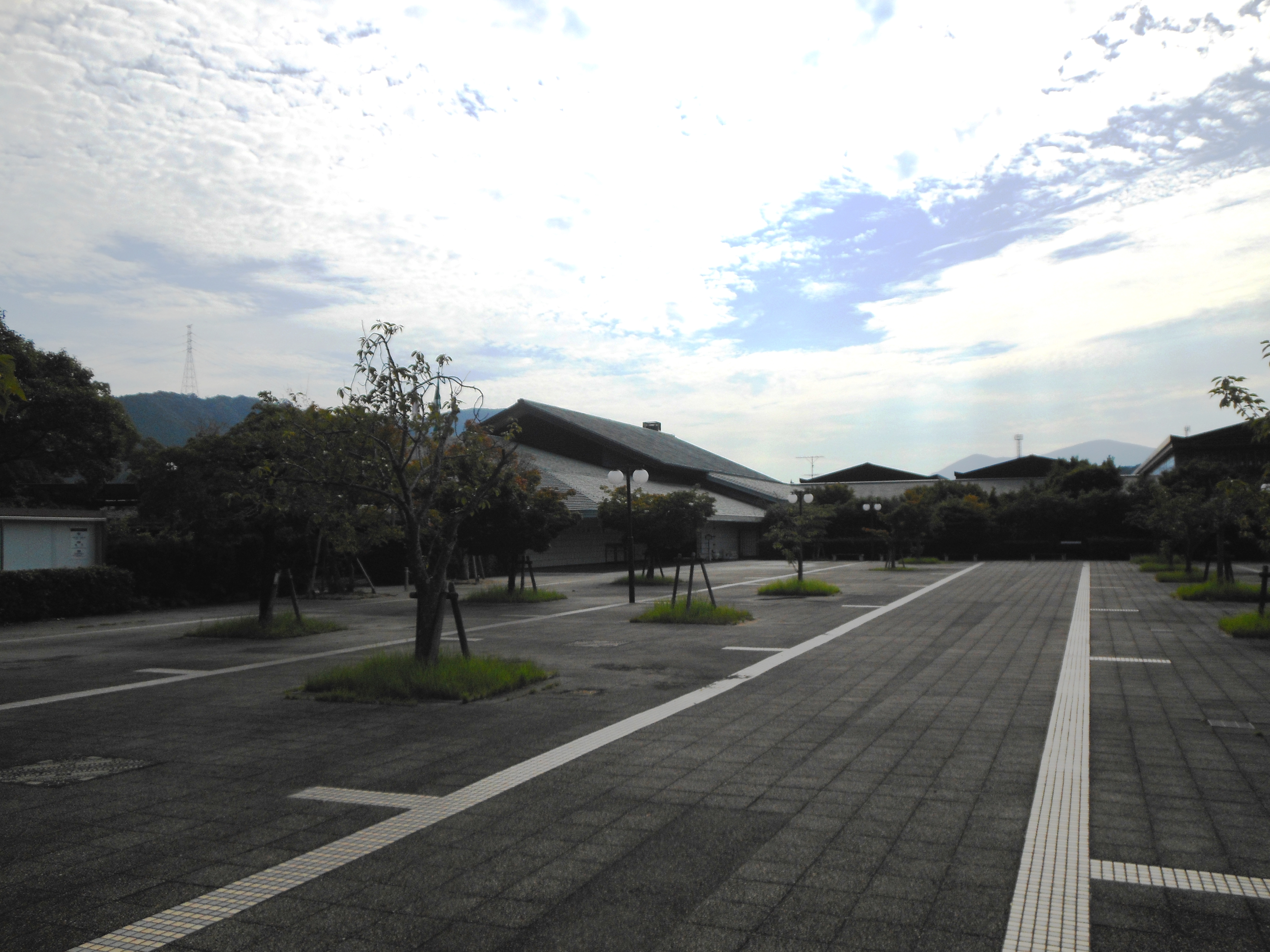
Kyushu Ceramic Museum

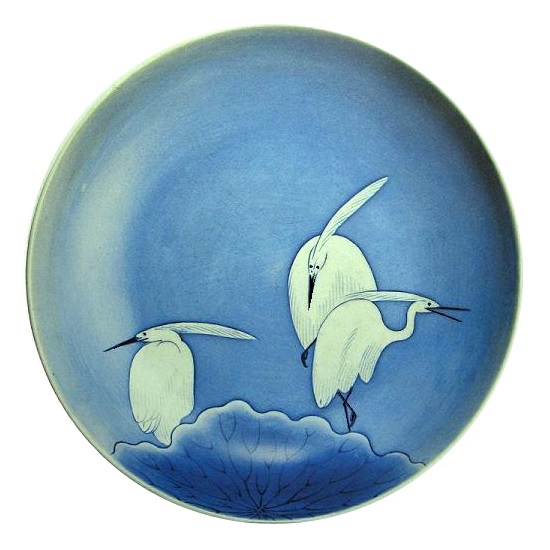
Large dish with heron design, underglaze blue, 1690-1710s, Okawachi kiln, Hizen, Important Cultural Property

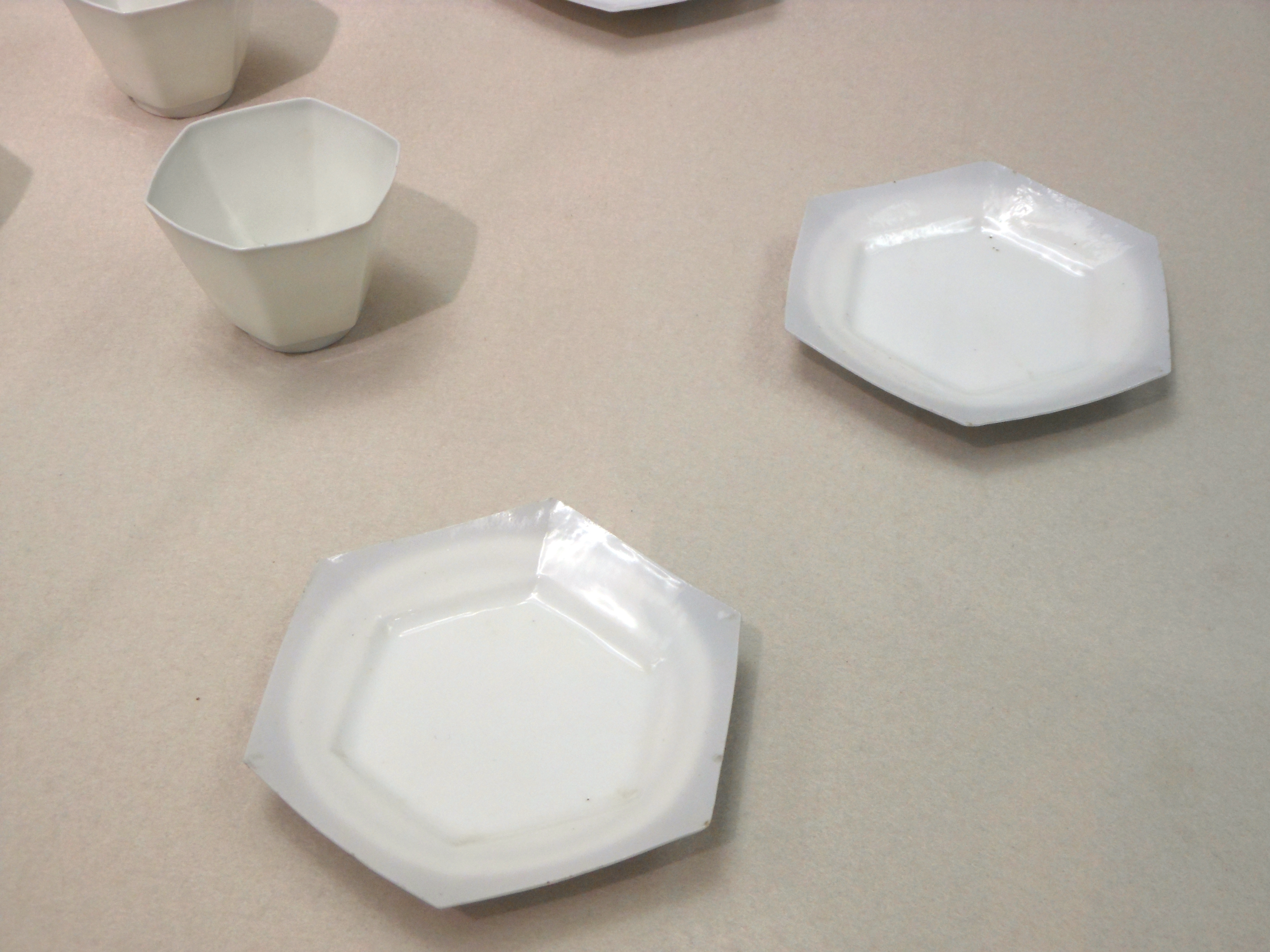
Arita ware Hakuji white porcelain hexagonal bowls and dishes, 1840–1870, late Edo period to early Meiji era

The Kyushu Ceramics Museum (九州陶磁文化館, Kyūshū Toji Bunkakan) is a museum located in Arita town, Saga Prefecture, Japan. It is one of Japan's many museums which are supported by a prefecture.

The museum was built to contribute to the local cultural heritage, and the development of ceramics and pottery culture throughout Kyūshū, southern Japan. A valuable and extensive exhibition of work such as the famous Kanbara Collection of old Imari from Europe of the 17th to 18th centuries, as well as the Shibata Collection covering Arita pottery manufactured from 1603 to 1867.

Collections:

- Shibata Collection

- Kanbara Collection

- Old Ceramics of Kyushu

- Hakuu Collection

- Takatori Collection

- Aoki Ryuzan Works Collection

- Nakazato Hoan Works Collection

== See also ==
- Ceramics museum
- Fukuoka Oriental Ceramics Museum
- Prefectural museum
