= Autumn Ivy =

Edo period painting by Ogata Kenzan

- 蔦紅葉図 (Japanese)
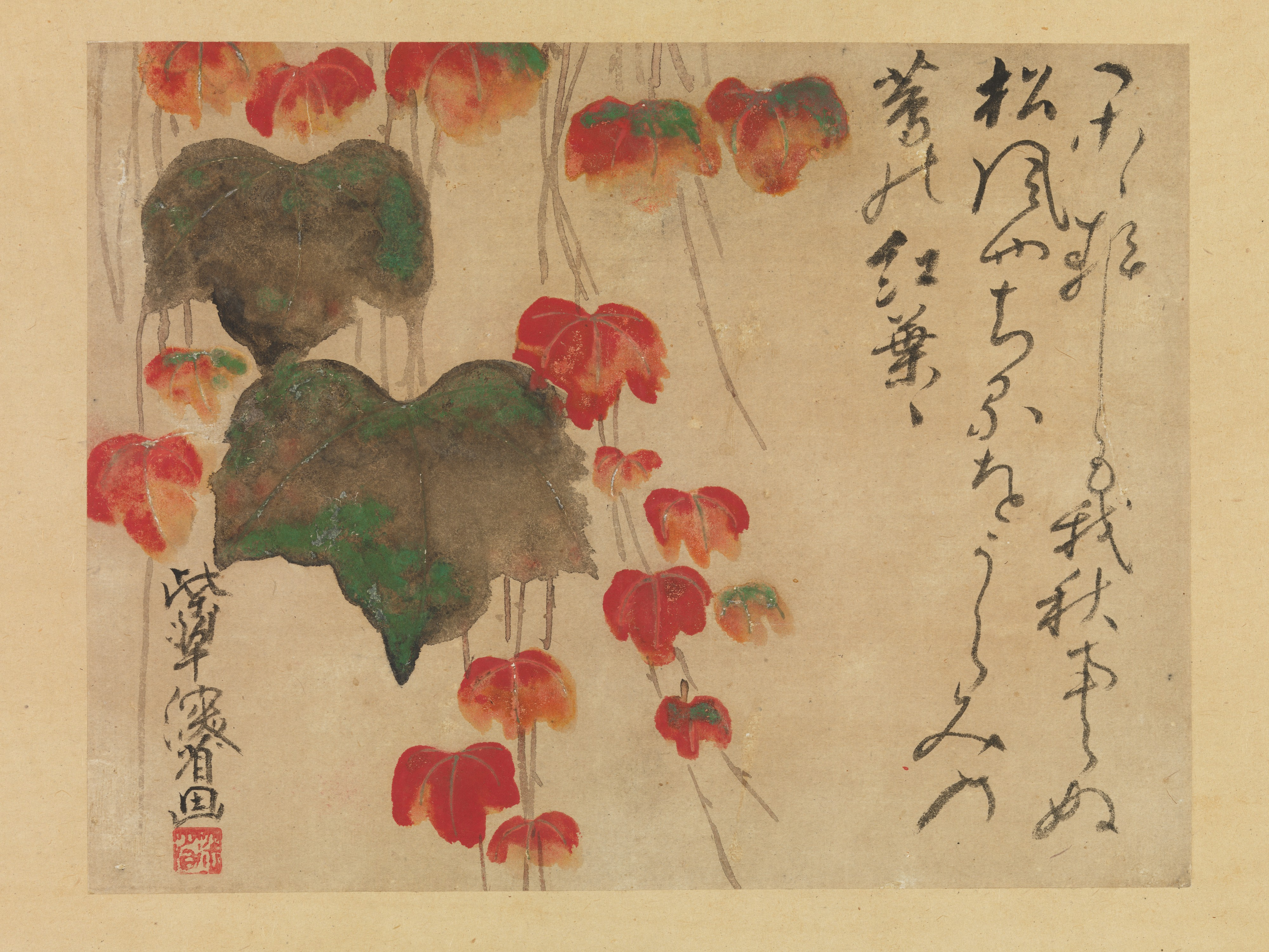
- Artist: Ogata Kenzan
- Year: after 1732
- Medium: Ink, color, and gold on paper
- Dimensions: 21.3 cm × 27.6 cm (8.4 in × 10.9 in)
- Location: Metropolitan Museum of Art; New York

Autumn Ivy (Japanese: 蔦紅葉図) is an Edo period painting by Japanese artist Ogata Kenzan. Done in an assortment of ink, colors, and gold on paper, the work depicts ivy in Autumn. The painting recalls an episode from The Tales of Ise in which the tale's protagonist encounters a transient monk on the path to Mount Utsu.
