= Fukuoka Oriental Ceramics Museum =

Museum in Fukuoka Prefecture, Japan

- 福岡東洋陶磁美術館
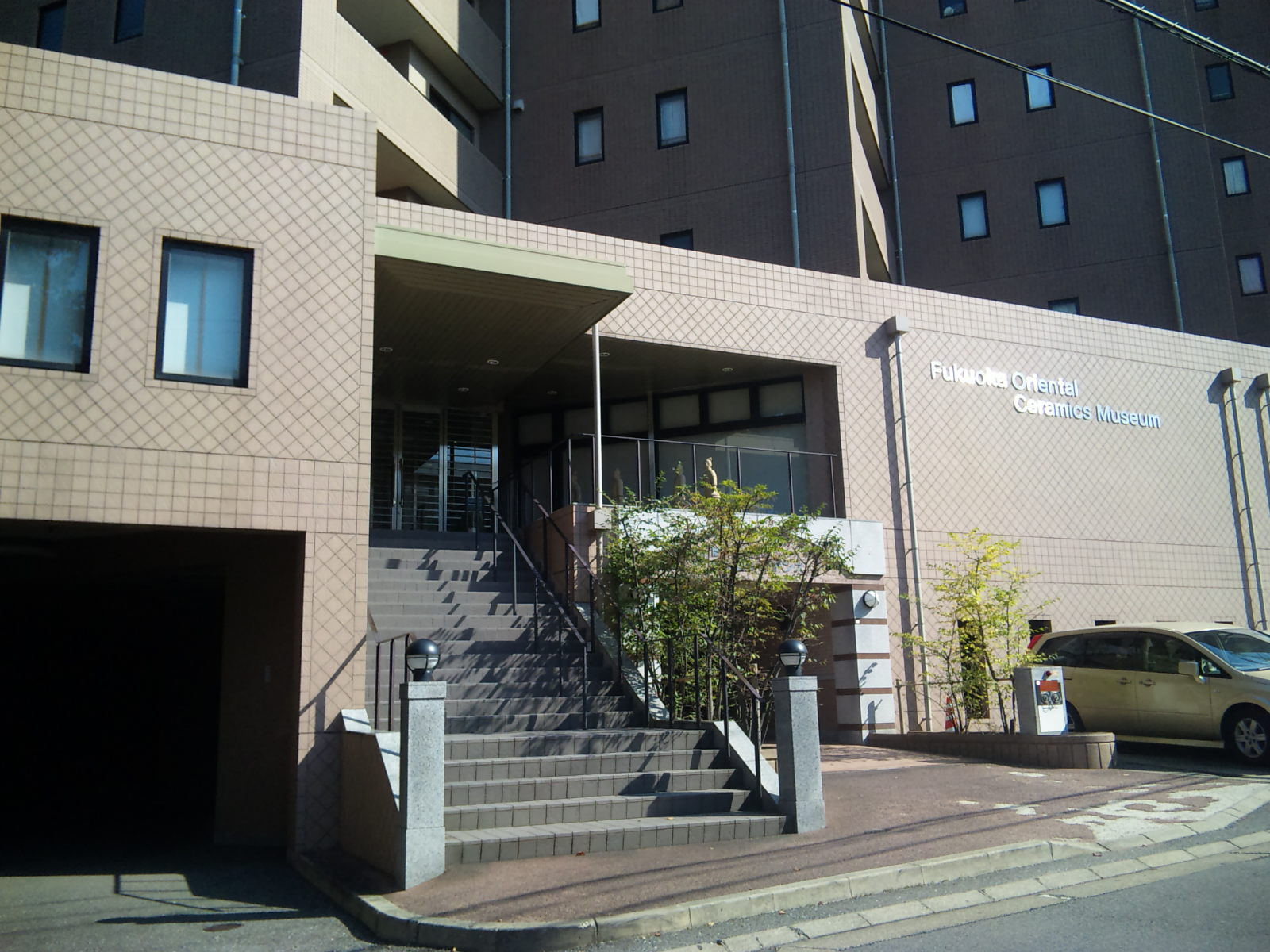
- Interactive map of the Fukuoka Oriental Ceramics Museum area

General information
- Location: 8-7-42 Nanakuma, Jōnan-ku, Fukuoka, Fukuoka Prefecture, Japan
- Coordinates: 33°33′08″N 130°21′48″E
- Opened: April 1999

Website
- Official website

Fukuoka Oriental Ceramics Museum (福岡東洋陶磁美術館, Fukuoka tōyō tōji bijutsukan) opened in Fukuoka, Japan, in 1999. The rotating displays of Chinese, Korean, and Japanese ceramics draw from the collection of some four hundred pieces.

== See also ==
- Fukuoka Art Museum
- Kyushu Ceramic Museum
