= Kyushu Historical Museum =

Coordinates: 33°26′21.36″N 130°33′29.82″E

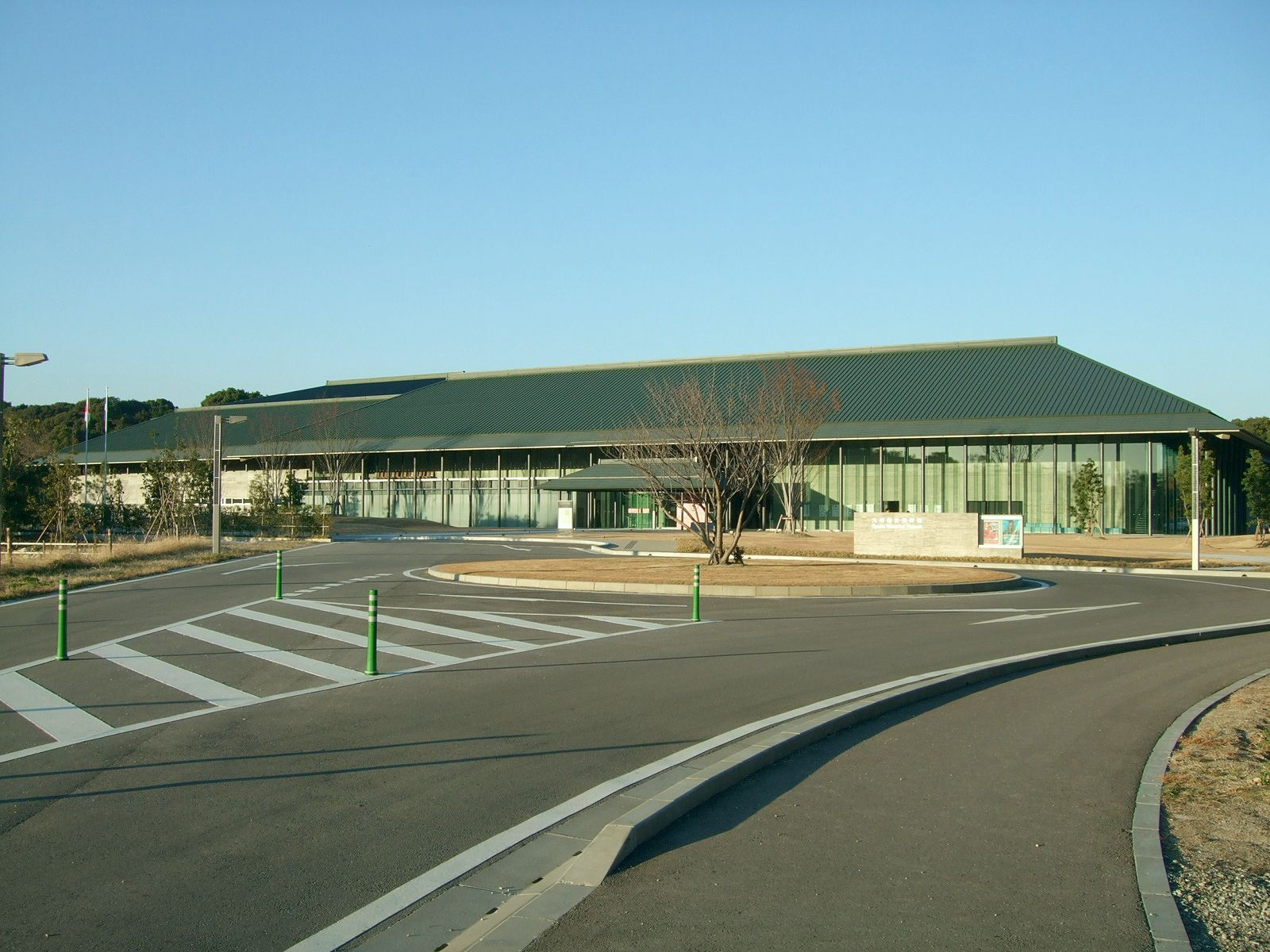
Kyushu Historical Museum

The Kyushu Historical Museum (九州歴史資料館, Kyushu-rekishi-shiryokan) is a history museum in Ogōri, Fukuoka, Japan.

The museum first opened in Dazaifu in 1973, but moved to its present location in 2010. The site of the new museum is twice as large as the original location.

== Access ==
The museum is located approximately 10 minutes' walk from Mikunigaoka Station on the Nishitetsu Tenjin Ōmuta Line.
