= Kitakyushu Museum of Natural History & Human History =

- 北九州市立いのちのたび博物館
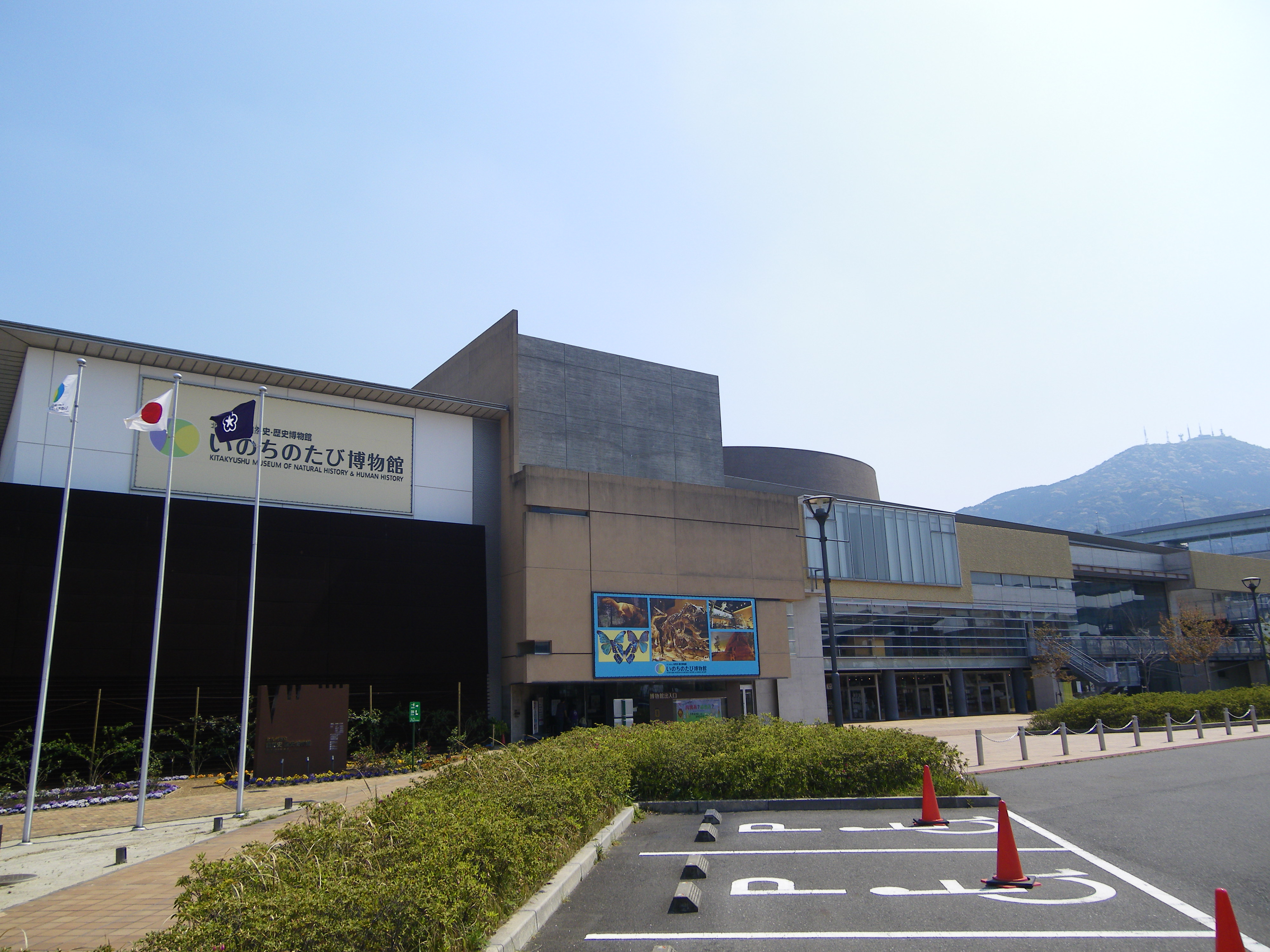
- Interactive map of the Kitakyushu Museum of Natural History & Human History area

General information
- Location: 2-4-1 Higashida, Yahatahigashi-ku, Kitakyushu, Fukuoka Prefecture, Japan
- Coordinates: 33°52′09″N 130°48′31″E
- Opened: November 2002

Website
- Official website

Kitakyushu Museum of Natural History & Human History (北九州市立いのちのたび博物館[自然史・歴史博物館], Kitakyūshū Shiritsu Inochi-no-Tabi Hakubutsukan (Shizenshi-Rekishi Hakubutsukan)) opened in Kitakyushu, Fukuoka Prefecture, Japan, in 2002. Exhibiting materials relating to the city's natural history, archaeology, and history, it is successor of the Kitakyushu Museum of History (北九州市立歴史博物館), which opened in 1975, the Kitakyushu Museum of Natural History (北九州市立自然史博物館), which opened in 1981, and the Kitakyushu Museum of Archaeology (北九州市立考古博物館), which opened in 1983.

== See also ==
- Kitakyushu Municipal Museum of Art
- List of Historic Sites of Japan (Fukuoka)
- List of Cultural Properties of Japan - paintings (Fukuoka)
- List of Museums in Fukuoka Prefecture
