= Ogata Kenzan =

Japanese potter and painter (1663–1743)

- Born: Ogata Shinsei; 1663; Kyoto, Japan
- Died: 1743; Edo (now Tokyo), Japan
- Education: Studied under Nonomura Ninsei
- Known for: Pottery, painting, calligraphy
- Notable work: Autumn Ivy, Snow-laden Pine Boughs
- Style: Ceramic art
- Movement: Rinpa
- Patrons: Nijō Tsunahira, Rinnojinomiya Kinkan

Ogata Kenzan (尾形 乾山; 1663–1743), originally Ogata Shinsei (尾形 深省), was an Edo period Japanese potter, painter, and calligrapher. He was also known by the pseudonyms Shisui, Shōkosai, Shuseidō, Tōin, and Shinshō. He is associated with Kyō ware and Kiyomizu ware.

== Biography ==
Ogata Kenzan was the third son born into a rich kimono merchant family in Kyoto. The family's shop, the Kariganeya, was patronized by Oeyo, the wife of Tokugawa Hidetada, and Tokugawa Masako. His father was Ogata Sōken (1621–1687), a calligrapher and patron of Noh. His older brother was the painter Ogata Kōrin (1658–1716). Following his father's death, the eldest of the Ogata brothers took over the Kariganeya, allowing Kenzan and Kōrin to enjoy their inheritance and pursue pottery and painting. From a young age, Ogata received lessons in pottery from Koho and Rakuichi, grandchildren of Hon'ami Kōetsu.

In 1689, Ogata established Shuseidō hall south of Ninna-ji. Ogata studied with the potter Nonomura Ninsei whose Omuru kiln was located at the front gate of Ninna-ji. In 1699, Kugyō Nijō Tsunahira provided Ogata with a mountain villa in Ukyō-ku, Kyoto where Kenzan established his own kiln. In 1731, Kenzan was invited by Cloistered Imperial Prince Rinnojinomiya Kinkan to move to Edo where he spent the remainder of his life. He died at the age of 81.

Ogata produced a distinctive style of freely brushed grasses, blossoms, and birds as decorative motifs for pottery. His pieces were noted for their perfect relation between design and shape. He often collaborated on the decoration of pottery with his older brother, Ogata Kōrin, after whom the style known as Rinpa was named.

== Gallery ==
Selected works by Ogata Kenzan
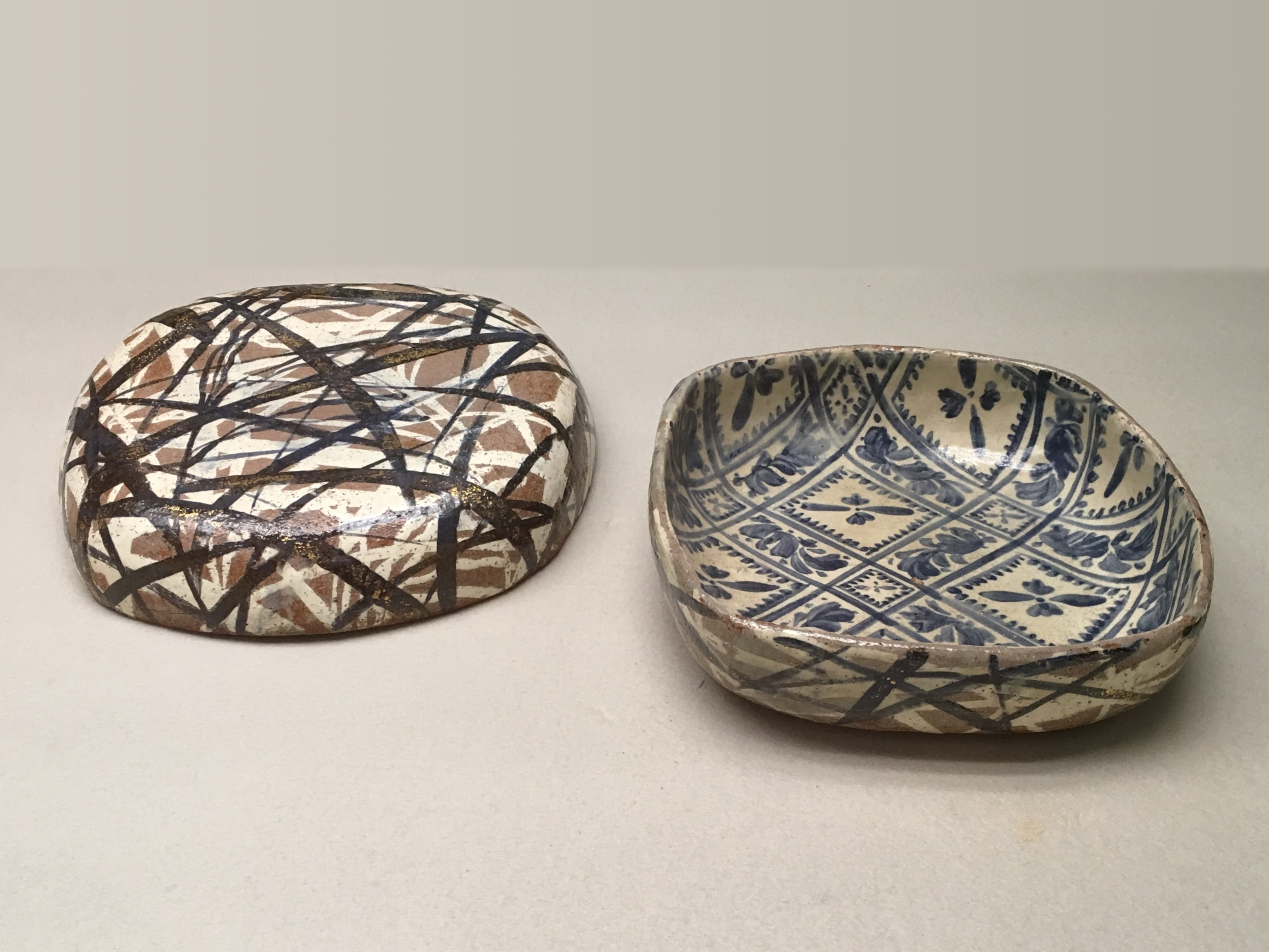
Container, earthenware, Edo period, first half of 18th century (Important Cultural Property)

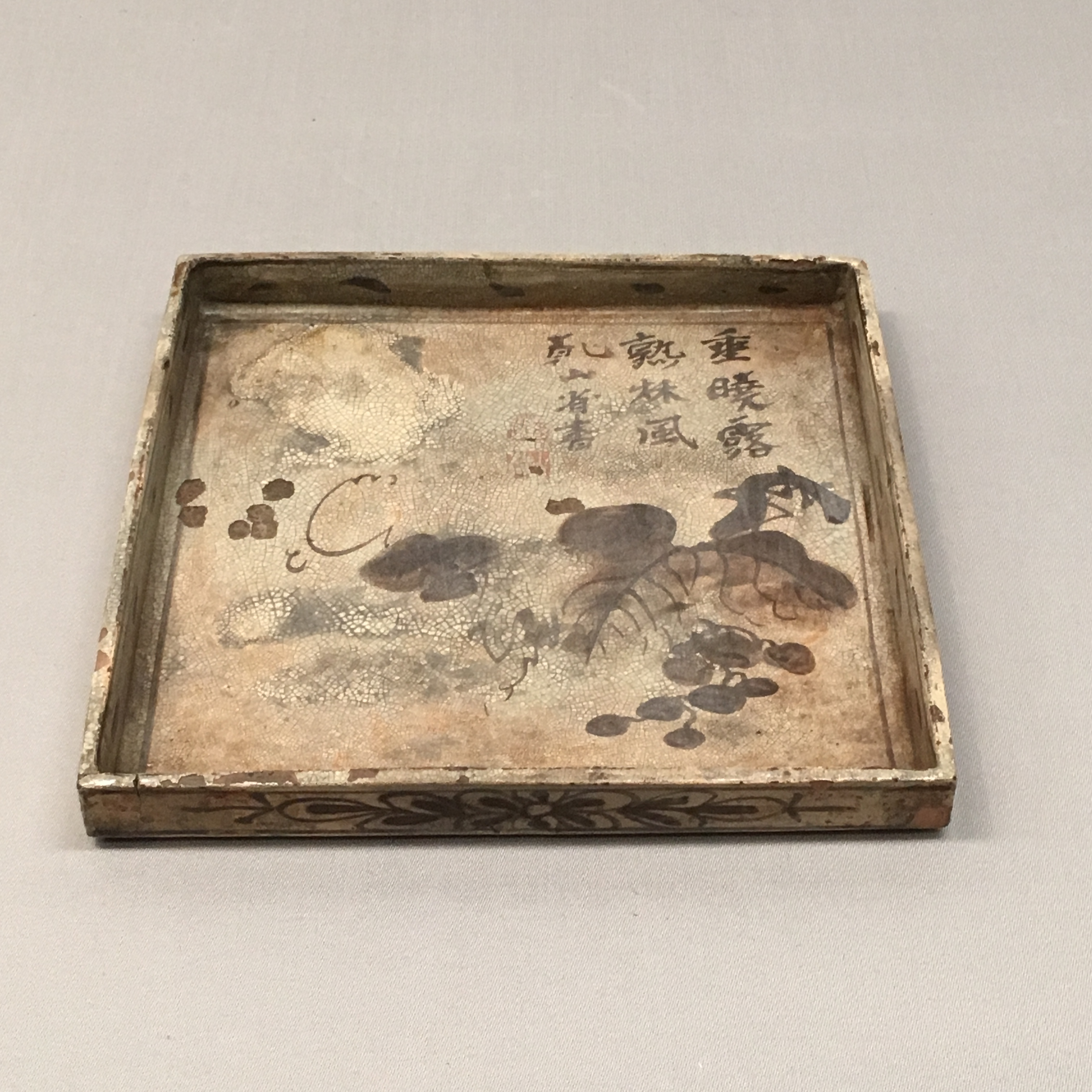
Square dish with grapes that was exhibited at the 1873 Vienna World's Fair. It was later salvaged from the sunken ship Le Nil that was transporting it back to Japan.

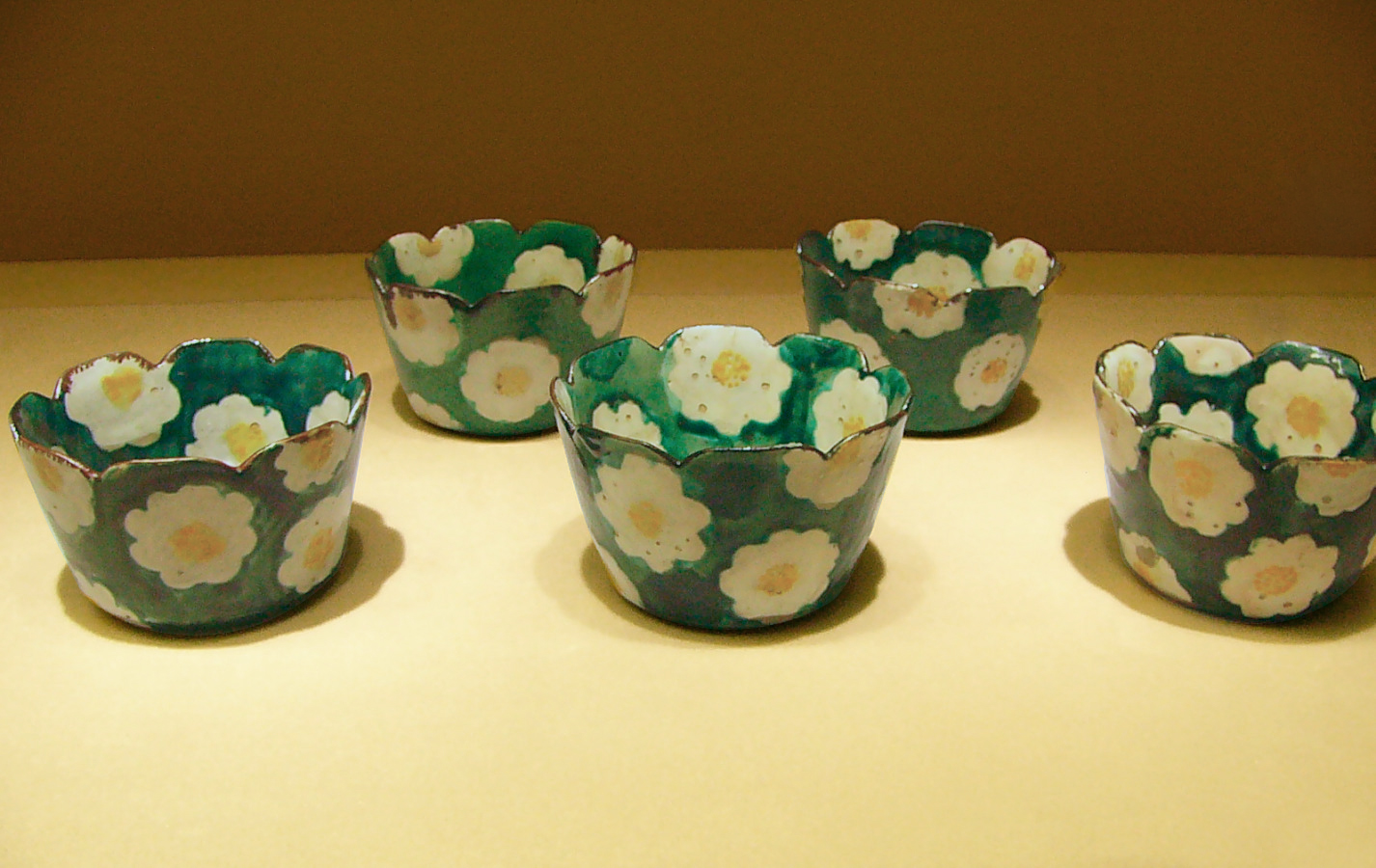
Five small glazed pottery bowls

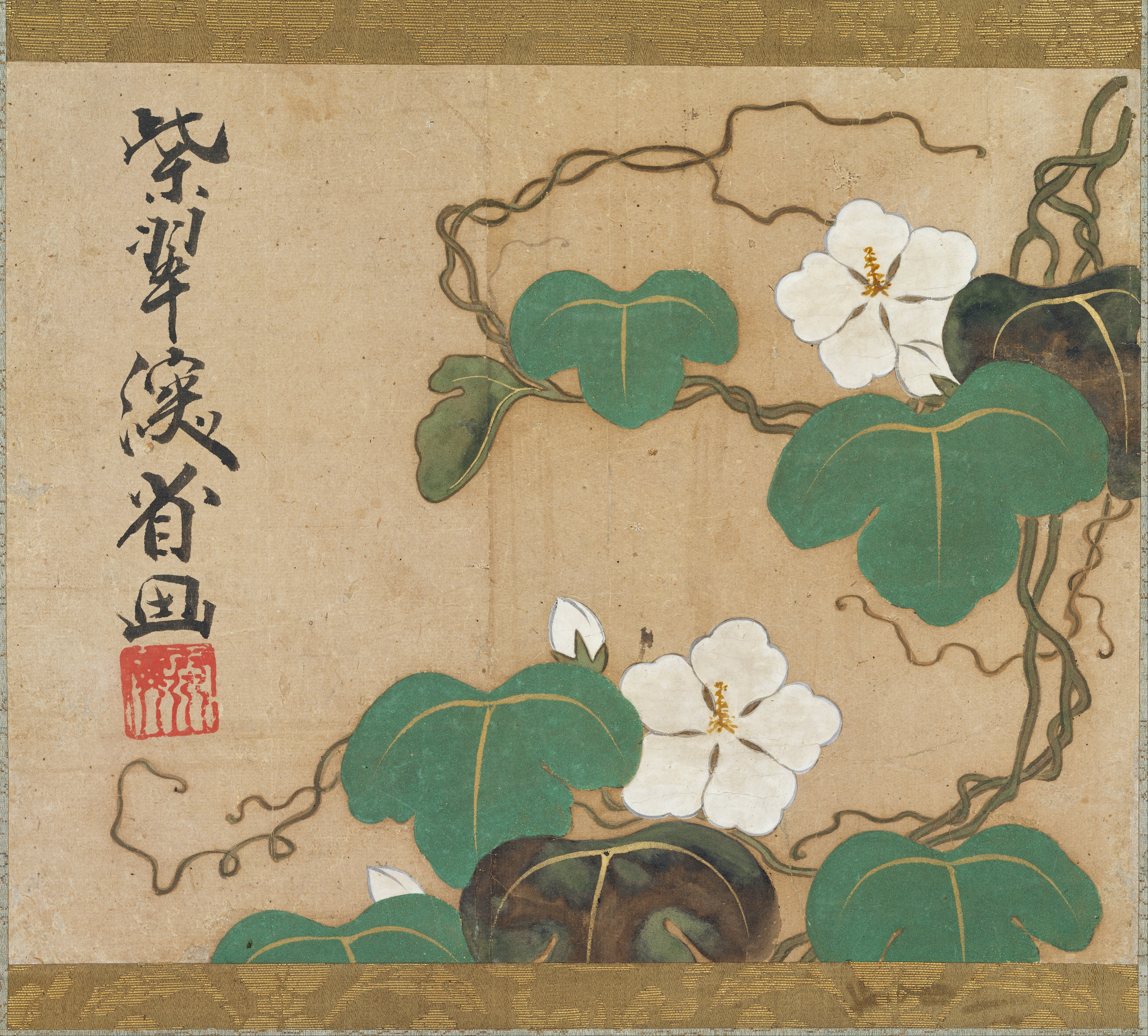
Hanging scroll; ink, color, and gold on paper painting of evening glories

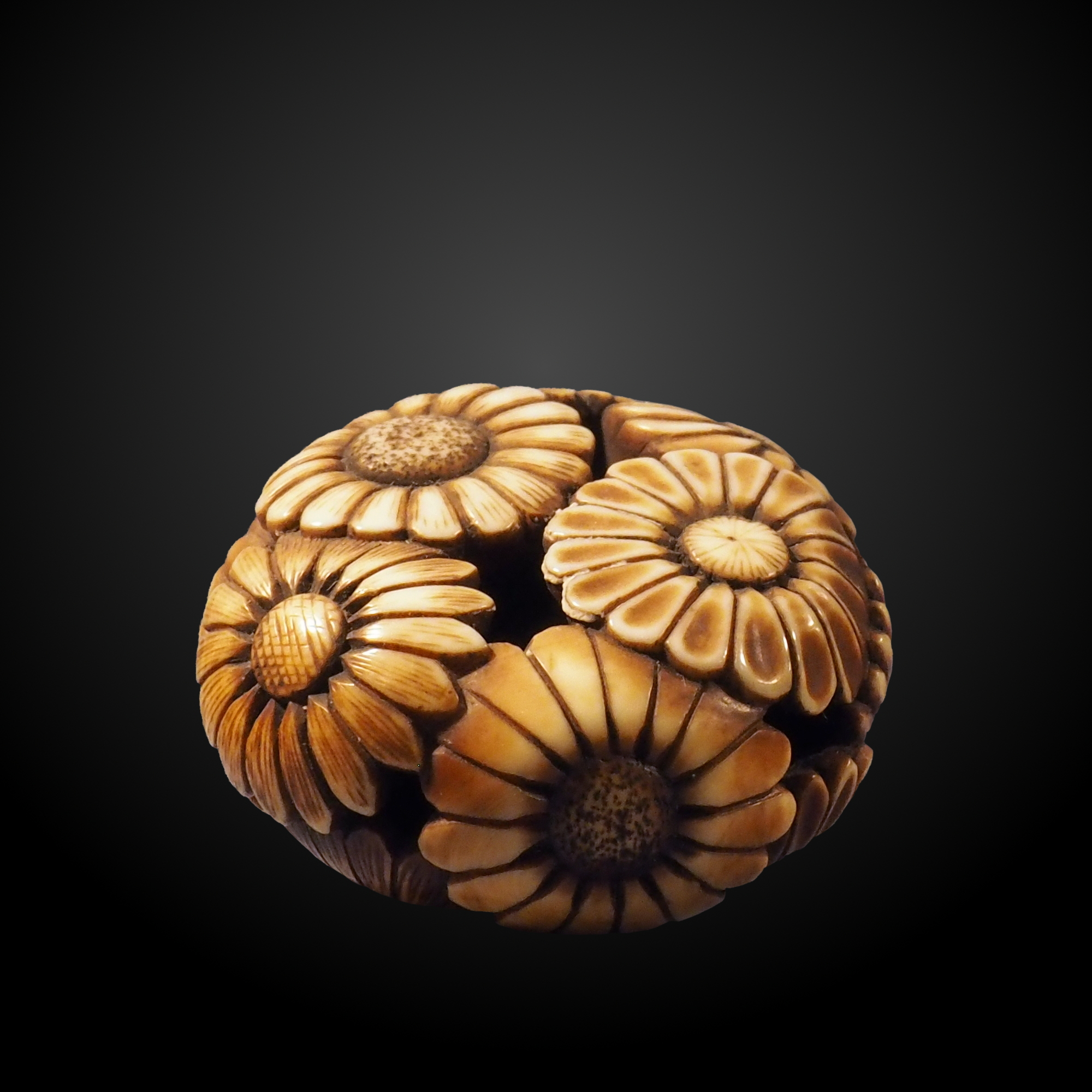
Netsuke depicting chrysanthemums

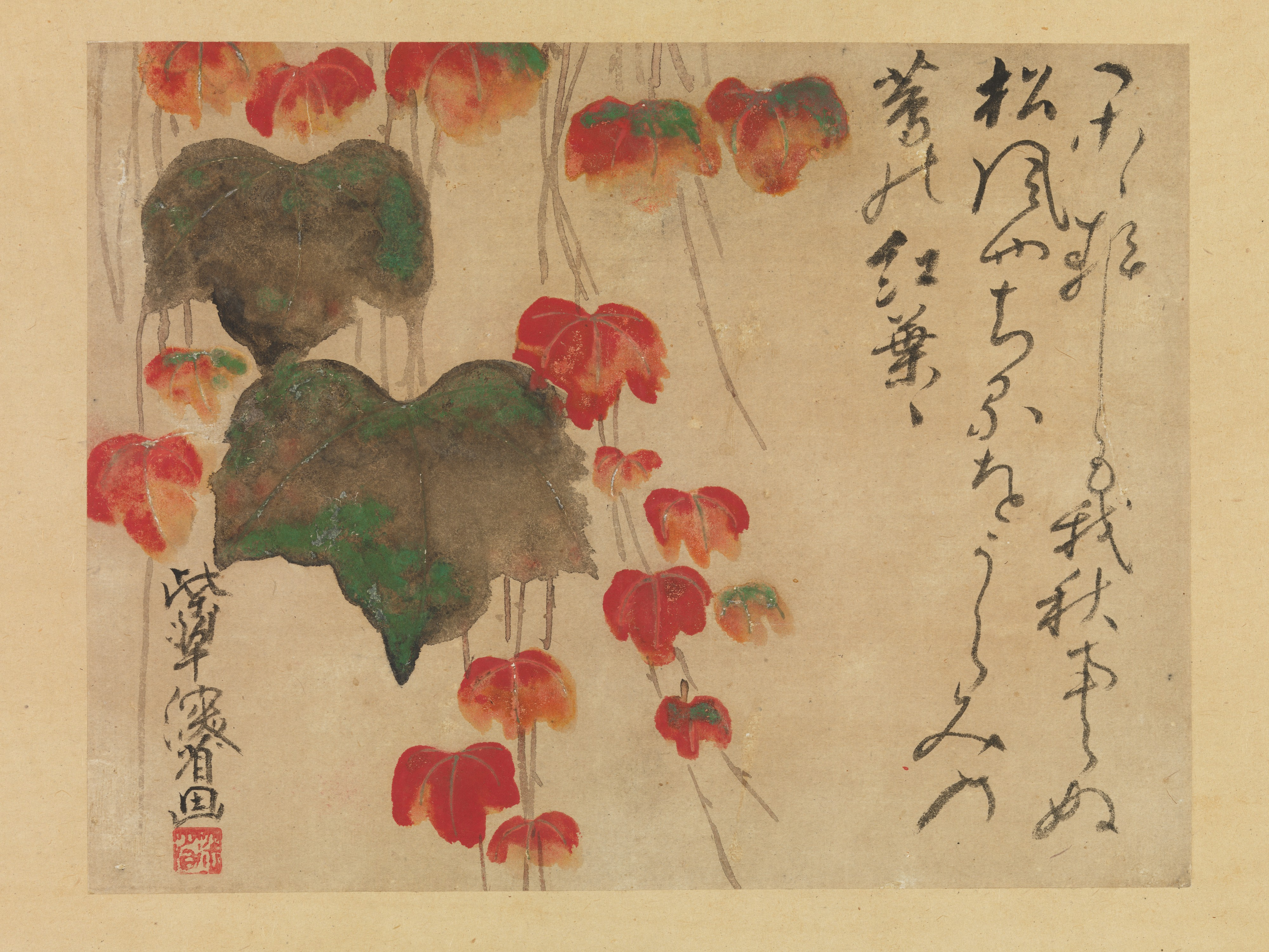
Autumn Ivy, after 1732
