= Fukuoka Art Museum =

Coordinates: 33°35′2″N 130°22′47.3″E

- 福岡市美術館
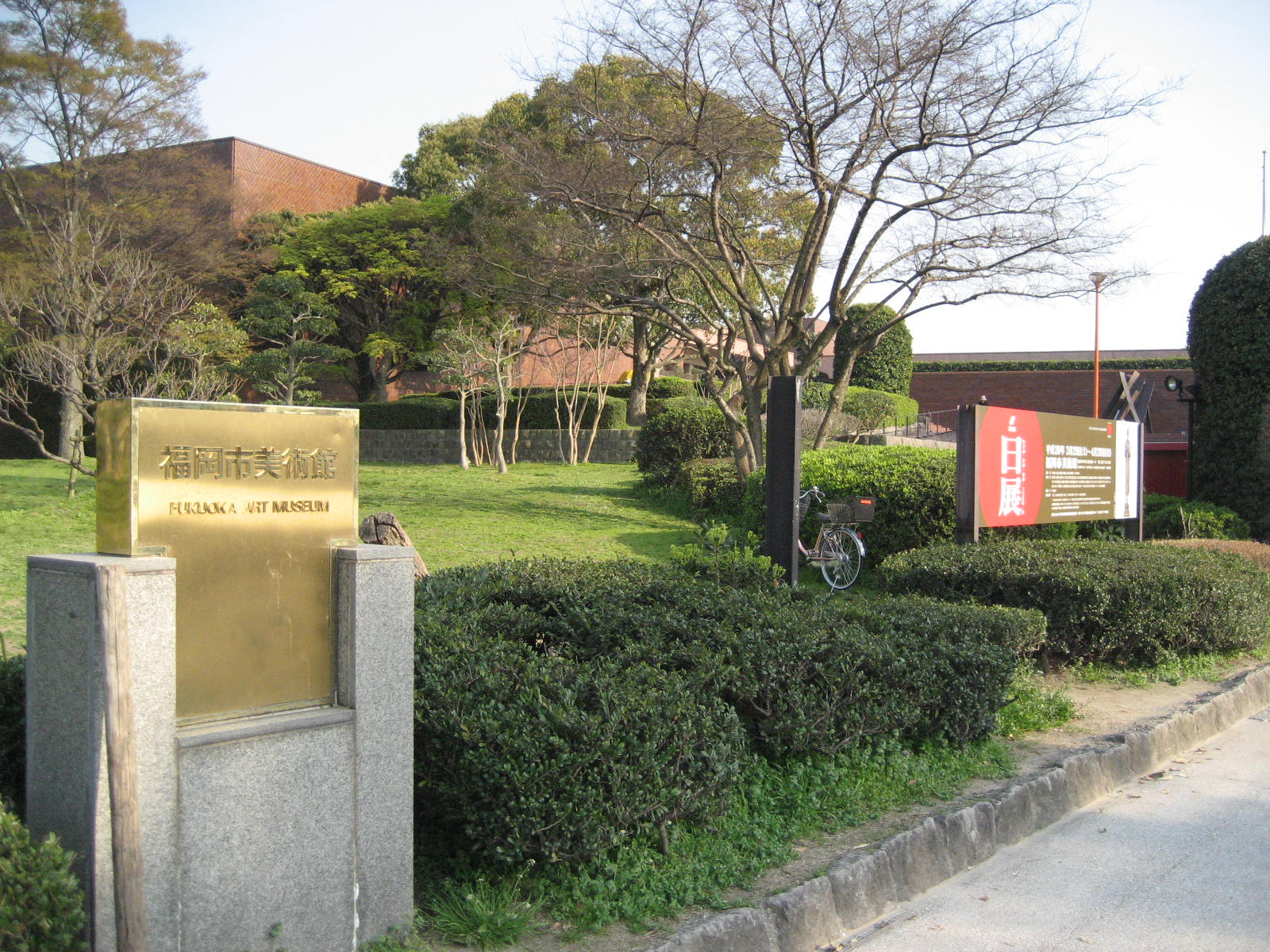
- Established: 1979
- Location: Chūō-ku, Fukuoka, Japan
- Type: Art museum
- Public transit access: Ōhorikōen Station

Fukuoka Art Museum (福岡市美術館, Fukuoka-shi Bijutsukan) is an art museum in Fukuoka, Japan. It contains a notable collection of Western and Asian art, and exhibits various temporary exhibitions. In November 2010 it hosted a large exhibition of Marc Chagall's work.

The Madonna of Port Lligat by Salvador Dalí is exhibited at this museum.

== Fukuoka Asian Art Triennale ==
The Fukuoka Asian Art Triennale is held every three years with a different theme. Organized by The executive committee of the Fukuoka Asian Art Triennale and began in 1999, it introduces the latest in art from 21 countries and regions throughout Asia.

- The 1st Fukuoka Asian Art Triennale (1999)
- The 2nd Fukuoka Asian Art Triennale (2002)
- The 3rd Fukuoka Asian Art Triennale (2005)
- The 4th Fukuoka Asian Art Triennale (2009)
- The 5th Fukuoka Asian Art Triennale (2014)

== See also ==
- Fukuoka Oriental Ceramics Museum
