= List of cultural properties of Japan – paintings (Shizuoka) =

Tables of information on cultural properties of Japan

This list is of the cultural properties of Japan designated in the category of paintings (絵画, kaiga) for the Prefecture of Shizuoka.

== National Cultural Properties ==
As of 1 February 2016, forty-six Important Cultural Properties have been designated (including one *National Treasure), being of national significance.

Property	Date	Municipality	Ownership	Comments	Image	Dimensions	Coordinates	Ref.
*Red and White Plum Blossoms, colour on paper with gold ground, byōbu by Ogata Kōrin 紙本金地著色紅白梅図〈尾形光琳筆／二曲屏風〉 shihon kinji chakushoku kōhaku ume zu (Ogata Kōrin hitsu nikyoku byōbu)	early C18	Atami	Church of World Messianity (kept at MOA Museum of Art)	pair of two-fold screens		156.0 centimetres (61.4 in) by 172.2 centimetres (67.8 in)	35°29′56″N 136°39′05″E	
Spring and Summer Landscapes, colour on gold ground, byōbu attributed to Unkoku Tōgan 金地著色春夏山水図〈（伝雲谷等顔筆）／六曲屏風〉 kinji chakushoku shunka sansui zu (den-Unkoku Tōgan hitsu rokkyoku byōbu)	Momoyama period		private	pair of six-fold screens				
Gentleman Viewing the Moon, light colour on silk 絹本淡彩高士観月図 kenpon tansai saikōshi kangetsu zu	Southern Song	Atami	Church of World Messianity (kept at MOA Museum of Art)	attributed to Ma Yuan		57.3 centimetres (22.6 in) by 26.5 centimetres (10.4 in)	35°29′56″N 136°39′05″E	
Amida Triad, colour on silk 絹本著色阿弥陀三尊像 kenpon chakushoku Amida sanzon zō	Goryeo	Atami	Church of World Messianity (kept at MOA Museum of Art)	Goryeo Buddhist painting		100.9 centimetres (39.7 in) by 54.2 centimetres (21.3 in)	35°29′56″N 136°39′05″E	
Aizen Myōō, colour on silk 絹本著色愛染明王像 kenpon chakushoku Aizen Myōō zō	1327	Atami	Church of World Messianity (kept at MOA Museum of Art)			137.0 centimetres (53.9 in) by 90.3 centimetres (35.6 in)	35°29′56″N 136°39′05″E	
Solitary Fisherman on a Wintry River, colour on silk 絹本著色寒江独釣図 kenpon chakushoku kankō dokuchō zu	Yuan	Atami	Church of World Messianity (kept at MOA Museum of Art)	attributed to Ma Lin		31.4 centimetres (12.4 in) by 51.2 centimetres (20.2 in)	35°29′56″N 136°39′05″E	
Kichijōten Mandala, colour on silk 絹本著色吉祥天曼荼羅図 kenpon chakushoku Kisshōten mandara zu	Kamakura period	Atami	Church of World Messianity (kept at MOA Museum of Art)			124.0 centimetres (48.8 in) by 66.0 centimetres (26.0 in)	35°29′56″N 136°39′05″E	
Two Beauties, colour on silk, by Katsushika Hokusai 絹本著色二美人図〈葛飾北斎筆／〉 kenpon chakushoku ni bijin zu (Katsushika Hokusai hitsu)	C19	Atami	Church of World Messianity (kept at MOA Museum of Art)			110.6 centimetres (43.5 in) by 36.7 centimetres (14.4 in)	35°29′56″N 136°39′05″E	
Landscape, ink on silk, attributed to Ma Yuan 絹本墨画山水図〈（伝馬遠筆）／〉 kenpon bokuga sansui zu (den-Ba En hitsu)	Southern Song	Atami	Church of World Messianity (kept at MOA Museum of Art)			55.4 centimetres (21.8 in) by 32.0 centimetres (12.6 in)	35°29′56″N 136°39′05″E	
Beauty under a Tree, colour on paper 紙本著色樹下美人図〈／（伝トルファン出土）〉 shihon chakushoku juka bijin zu (den-Torufan shutsudo)	Tang	Atami	Church of World Messianity (kept at MOA Museum of Art)	said to have been excavated in Turfan		139.1 centimetres (54.8 in) by 53.3 centimetres (21.0 in)	35°29′56″N 136°39′05″E	

== Prefectural Cultural Properties ==
As of 1 June 2015, thirty-eight properties have been designated at a prefectural level.

Property	Date	Municipality	Ownership	Comments	Image	Dimensions	Coordinates	Ref.
Iō-ji Yakushidō Ceiling Paintings 医王寺薬師堂天井画; I医王寺薬師堂天井画ji Yakushidō tenjoga	1860	Shimada	Iō-ji (医王寺)	fifty-five panels, including one with dragon in clouds, four with Tennyo, and fifty with flowers and plants			35°06′34″N 139°04′32″E	

== See also ==
- Cultural Properties of Japan
- List of National Treasures of Japan (paintings)
- Japanese painting
- List of Historic Sites of Japan (Shizuoka)
- List of Museums in Shizuoka Prefecture
