= Genroku culture =

Irises screen by Ogata Kōrin

Genroku culture (Japanese: 元禄文化, Hepburn: Genroku bunka) is the term used to describe the culture of the early Edo period (1603–1867), in particular the Genroku era of 1688–1704. Genroku culture is known as a period of luxurious display when the arts were increasingly patronized by a growing and powerful merchant class. The Genroku period is associated with two pleasure zones: the brothel district and the theaters. These two areas were often located near each other on the margins of respectable society. These constituted the ukiyo ("floating world") celebrated in woodblock prints of prostitutes, actors, and pornography.

== Overview ==
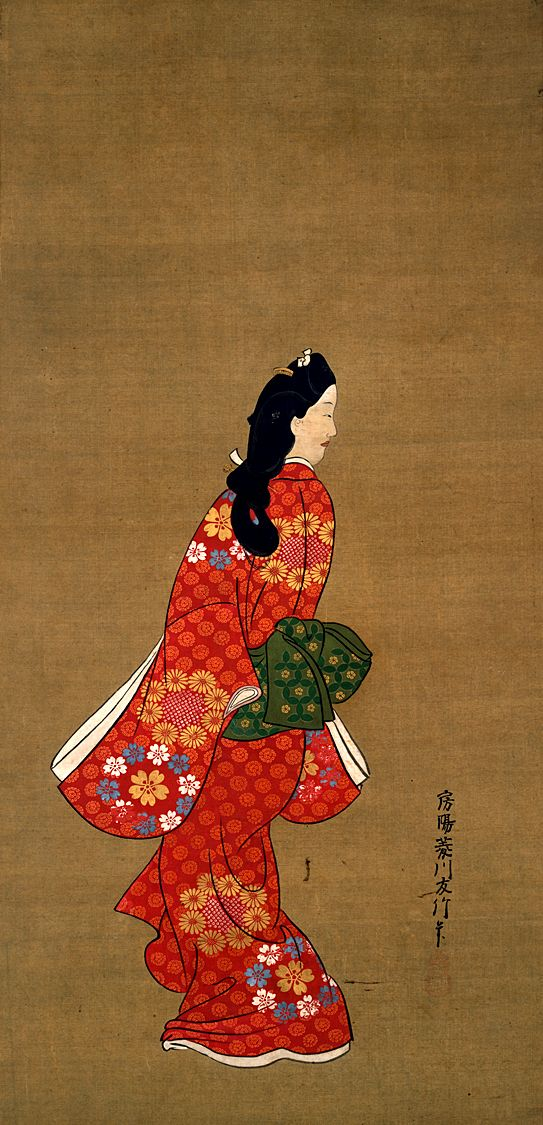
Beauty Looking Back, by Hishikawa Moronobu

Genroku culture was mainly centered in the Kamigata area, containing both Osaka and Kyoto. Genroku culture was defined by the fashions and lives of everyday townspeople, particularly those of the merchant classes, whose rising monetary wealth led developments in decorative art, theatre and clothing; however, the samurai classes were also involved in the development of Genroku culture. Genroku culture would contribute to the development of Neo-Confucian thought, natural science, and classical study. In fine art, the Rinpa school, founded by Korin Ogata and others, and the Tosa school both played active roles; in ceramic art, Ninsei Nonomura, Hon'ami Kōetsu and others were key players. In music, a number of key instruments and musical styles were developed during the Genroku period, including the koto (a thirteen-stringed Japanese zither) music of the Ikuta-ryu school, jiuta (a genre of traditional songs with shamisen accompaniment) music of the Nogawa School, shin-jōruri (new ballad drama) such as gidayu-bushi (musical narrative of the puppet theatre) and icchu-bushi melodies, and nagauta (lit. 'long songs', ballads with shamisen accompaniment).

== Arts ==
Red and White Plum Blossoms by Ogata Kōrin

It is generally felt that the Genroku period marks the highest point of Edo period culture. Two representative artists of Genroku culture are Rimpa school artists Ogata Kōrin and Hishikawa Moronobu, who is regarded as the founder of ukiyo-e. The term rimpa (琳派) is an amalgamation of the last syllable of "Kōrin". Torii Kiyonobu I was another influential ukiyo-e artist active within the Genroku period.

== Early manga ==
The printmaking of the Genroku period would later serve as the inspiration for manga. During this period, literacy in the pleasure quarters was truly significant for the geisha and oiran to entertain their patrons. Literary wit and knowledge was highly valued, not only in the upper echelons of society but throughout multiple castes.

The accessibility to literary arts came through a plethora of mediums. One integral form of literature, often considered the parent of manga, was kibyōshi, a form of woodblock printed adult comicbook typically spanning no more than 30 pages. Although this genre in its initial stages focused on the Yoshiwara pleasure quarters, later it was used as a tool to represent iconographic figures and satirize various classics and issues of the time. Due to the use of illustrations, this form of art appealed to the humble-ranked samurai and the common people. One notable kibyoshi author was Santō Kyōden (山東京伝), who generated sales of over ten thousand copies, with his compositions considered the most read literature during the Genroku era.

== Novels and poetry ==
The main elements of the emerging bourgeois culture were developed during the Genroku period within the Kamigata region. Examples are the bunraku and kabuki plays of Chikamatsu Monzaemon, the Ukiyozōshi of Ihara Saikaku, and the poetic essays and haiku of Matsuo Bashō.

== Theater ==
Kabuki and bunraku (puppet theater) emerged at the heart of urban cultural life during the Genroku period.

=== Kabuki ===
It is widely believed that kabuki was founded by female dancer Izumo no Okuni. Kabuki originated as a means for prostitutes, majority female, to draw crowds and entice them to purchase sexual services. Performances were often held in outdoor theaters in dry riverbeds and alongside carnival entertainments such as bear and tiger acts or sumo wrestling.

In 1629, the Tokugawa shogunate banned female actors from kabuki in an effort to suppress prostitution, leaving to the development of onnagata (female roles) entirely played by men, a defining aspect of kabuki that has lasted to the modern day.

Aragoto-style actor Ichikawa Danjūrō I, wagoto-style actor Sakata Tōjūrō I, and onnagata actor Yoshizawa Ayame I are famous kabuki actors of the Genroku era.

=== Bunraku ===
Bunraku (puppet theater) is a form of theater that emerged in the Genroku period. Featuring puppets of roughly two-thirds human size, each puppet was controlled by a maximum of three men. A highly skilled singer-actor chanted the several parts and the narration alongside musical accompanists. Puppet theater was attractive to writers, and many famous bunraku plays, such as Date Musume Koi no Higanoko (伊達娘恋緋鹿子), would later be adapted for kabuki. Bunraku also provided a development of beautiful literary qualities within the theater genre.

The greatest bunraku playwright was Chikamatsu Monzaemon (1653–1725). His works offered a source of escapism for the common people, including scandalous contemporary events such as domestic murders.

=== Noh ===
Noh emerged from a host of ancient folk and popular performing arts, both indigenous and imported. During the early Edo period, Noh was frequently performed by women of the Kyoto pleasure quarters.

Unlike kabuki or bunraku, the development of Noh drama is usually portrayed as one of steady ascent, and was typically seen as an upper-class style of theater, frequently drawing from Shinto legend. Noh was refined and supported by both the shogunate and imperial courts. By the height of the Edo period, Noh had climbed beyond the reaches of the Japanese masses, preserving its exalted position until the Meiji period.

== See also ==
- Kasei culture
