= Irises screen =

Pair of folding screens by Japanese artist Ogata Kōrin

Irises (紙本金地著色燕子花図, shihonkinji chakushoku kakitsubata-zu) is a pair of six-panel folding screens (byōbu) by the Japanese artist Ogata Kōrin of the Rinpa school. It depicts an abstracted view of water with drifts of Japanese irises (Iris laevigata). The work was probably made circa 1701–1705, in the period of luxurious display in the Edo period known as Genroku bunka (Genroku-era culture).

The screens were housed for over 200 years by the Nishi Honganji Buddhist temple in Kyoto. They are now held by the Nezu Museum, and they are a National Treasure of Japan.

A similar pair of screens made by Ogata Kōrin about 5 to 12 years later depicting irises is held by the Metropolitan Museum of Art in New York City. All four Irises screens were displayed together for the first time in almost a century in 2012 at the "Korin: National Treasure Irises of the Nezu Museum and Eight-Bridge of The Metropolitan Museum of Art" exhibition at the Nezu Museum.

Both screens are inspired by an episode in The Tales of Ise. In turn, copies of the screens are believed to have influenced the post-impressionist paintings of Vincent van Gogh, including his Irises.

== Irises ==
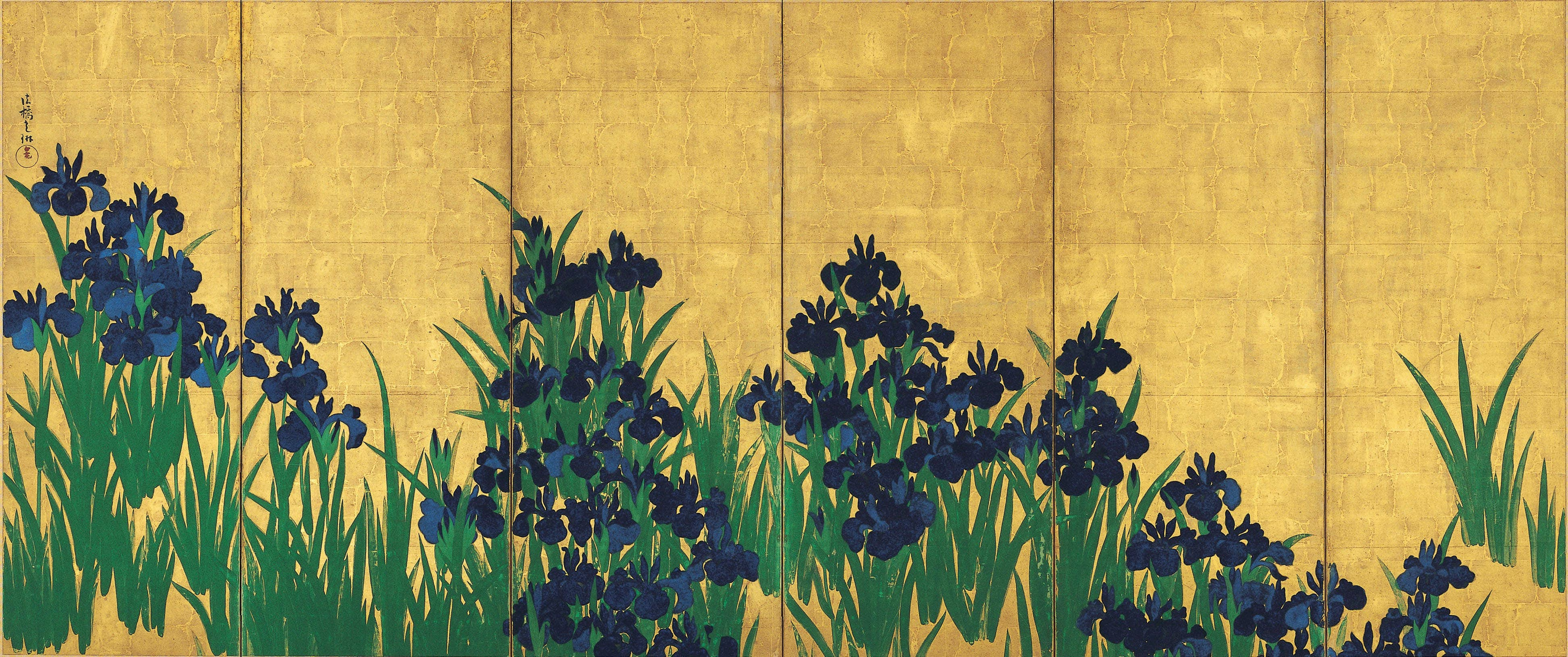
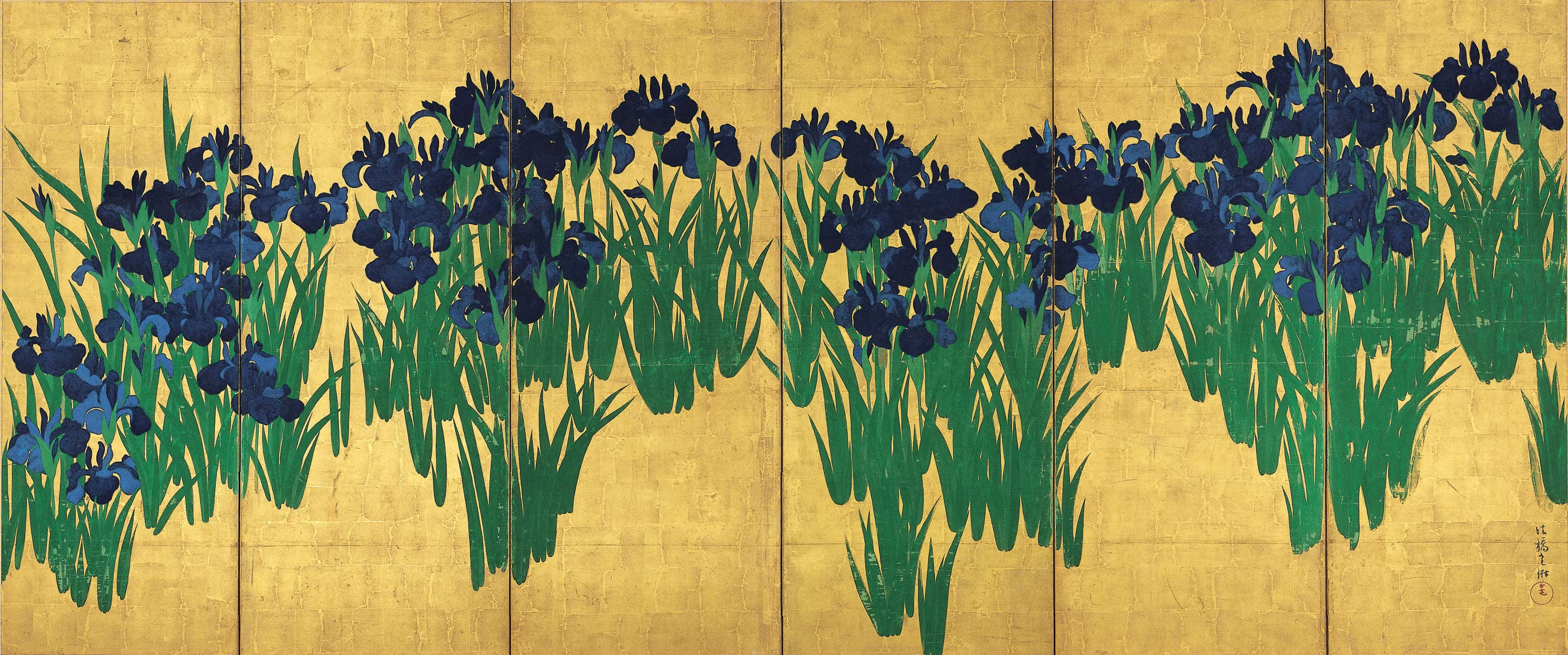
Irises, Ogata Kōrin, early 18th century

The screens are among the first works of Japanese painter and lacquerer Ogata Kōrin after he attained the rank of Hokkyō (法橋; “Bridge of the Dharma”), the third highest rank awarded to artists. It depicts bunches of abstracted blue Japanese irises in bloom, and their green foliage, creating a rhythmically repeating but varying pattern across the panels. The similarities of some blooms indicate that a stencil was used. The work shows influence of Tawaraya Sōtatsu. It is typical of a new artistic school, Rin-pa (琳派), which takes its name from the last syllable of his given name.

Kōrin adopts a very restrained palette, limited to the ultramarine blue of the flowers, the green of their foliage, and the gold background. The work was painted with ink and colour on paper, with squares of gold leaf applied around the painted areas to create a shimmering reflective background reminiscent of water. The deep blue was made from powdered azurite (群青, gunjō).

Each six-panel screen measures 150.9 by 338.8 centimetres (59.4 in × 133.4 in). The screens were probably made for the Nijō family, and were presented to the Nishi Honganji Buddhist temple in Kyoto. They were sold by the temple in 1913.

== Irises at Yatsuhashi ==
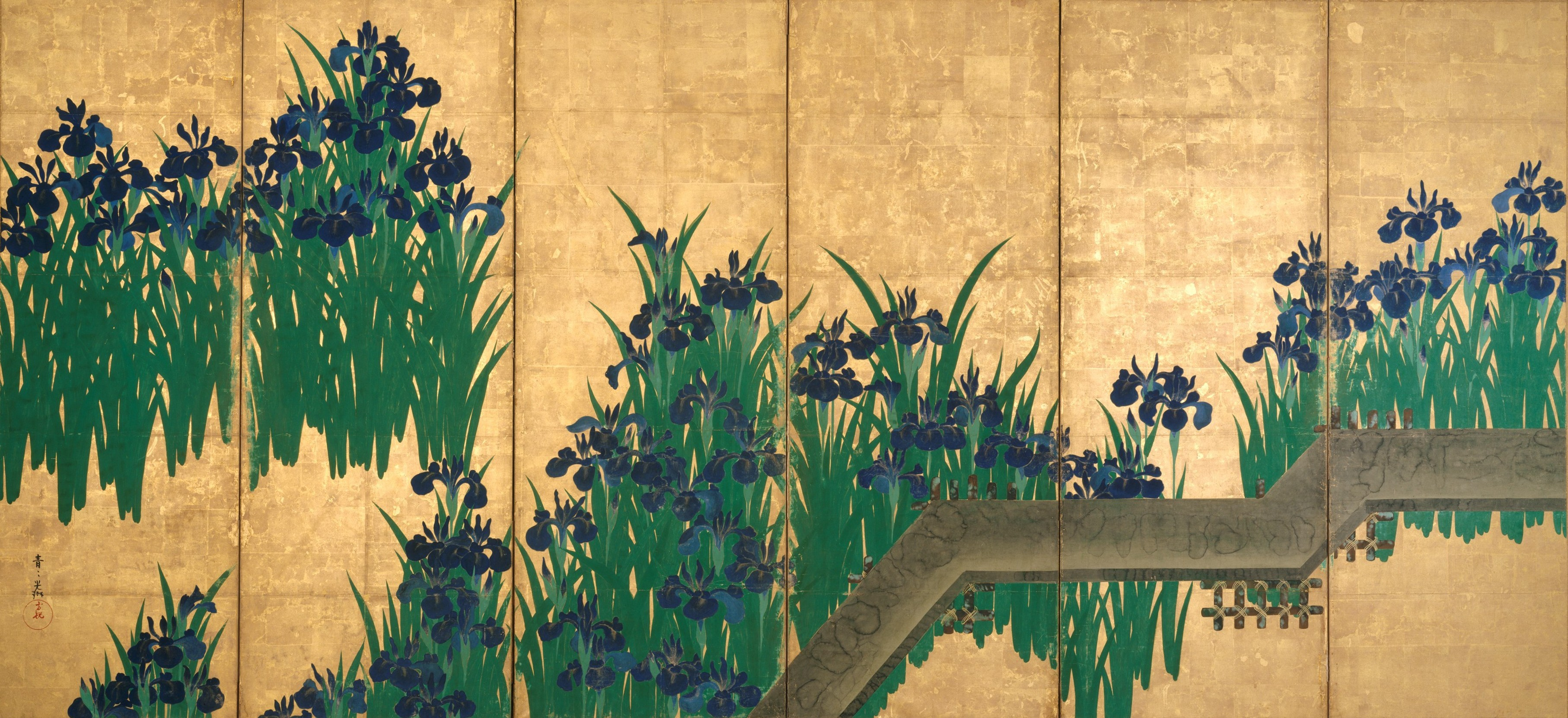
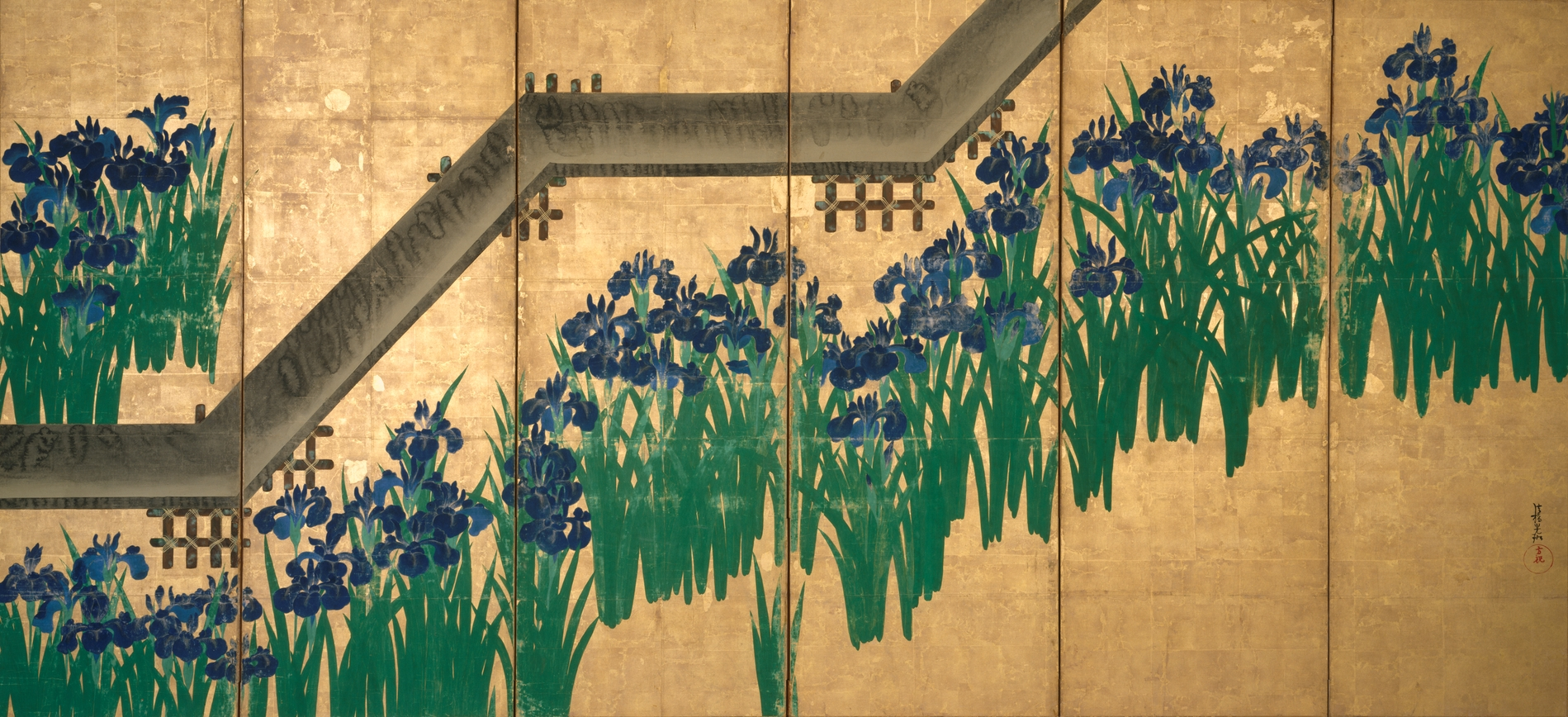
Irises at Yatsuhashi, Ogata Kōrin, early 18th century

Kōrin made a similar work about 5 to 12 years later, another pair of six-panel screens, known as Irises at Yatsuhashi (Eight Bridges) (八橋図屏風, Yatsuhashi-zu Byōbu). This second pair of screens has been held by the Metropolitan Museum of Art in New York City since 1953, and were last displayed in 2013.

The second pair of iris screens, circa 1710–1716, was also painted with ink and color on gold-foiled paper, and measure 179.1 x 371.5 centimetres (70.5 in x 146.25 in) each.

Unlike the earlier pair of iris screens, this later pair includes a depiction of an angular bridge, a more explicit reference to the literary work that inspired both artworks.

== The Tales of Ise ==
Both pairs of screens are inspired by an episode in The Tales of Ise, where the unnamed protagonist of the story (most likely Ariwara no Narihira) encounters the flowers near a rustic eight-plank bridge over a river. He was inspired to compose a romantic poem, a form of acrostic where the first syllable of each line spells out the Japanese word for iris, かきつばた (kakitsubata):

から衣きつつなれにし妻しあれば
はるばる来ぬる旅をしぞおもふ
Kara koromo kitsutsu nare ni shi tsuma shi areba harubaru kinuru tabi o shi zo omou
Thinking of my wife [in the capital] accustomed to wearing Chinese robes, I have come so far away on this trip.
(Ise Monogatari 9, also Kokin Wakashū 9:410)

== Influence ==
The screens clearly influenced the Irises paintings by Vincent van Gogh: he could never have seen the originals, which were still in Japan, but they were reproduced as woodcuts in a collection, the Kōrin Hyakuzu Kōhen.

== See also ==
- Red and White Plum Blossoms
