= Kasei culture =

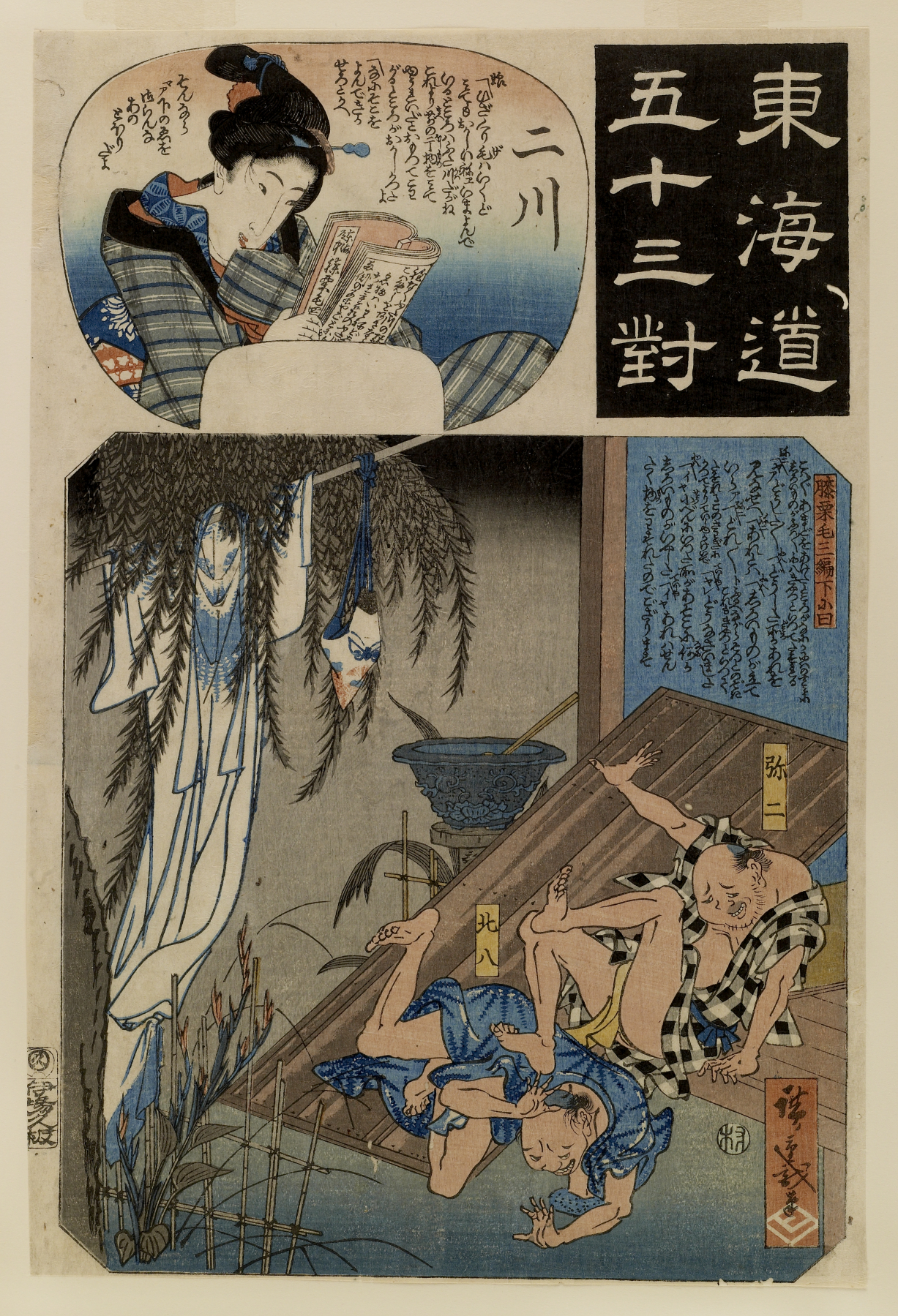
Tōkaidōchū Hizakurige

Kasei culture (Japanese: 化政文化) was townsman culture that developed in the late Edo period, mainly between 1804 and 1829. Senryū (humorous or ironical haiku) that satirized political and social events, or everyday life became popular.

== Overview ==
Kasei culture arose in Edo (old Tokyo) and spread to various places along with the nationwide communications among merchants and dissemination of publishing and education. With this expansion, the contents of the culture became various and widespread to common people. When Genroku culture flourished in the early Edo period, the cultural center of Japan was Kamigata (in the Kyoto and Osaka area). However, with the advent of Kasei culture, Japan's cultural centre shifted to Edo. This era is most frequently seen in Japanese historical dramas.

In literature, funny stories that comically described ordinary people's life, such as Tōkaidōchū Hizakurige ('Travels on Foot on the Tōkaidō Road') written by Ikku Jippensha, became popular and the most preferred form of literary entertainment. In woodblock prints, the improvement of printing technology led to the introduction of a number of colors, leading to a rise in their popularity and experimentation by artists with new techniques.
