= MOA Museum of Art =

Art museum

- エムオーエー美術館
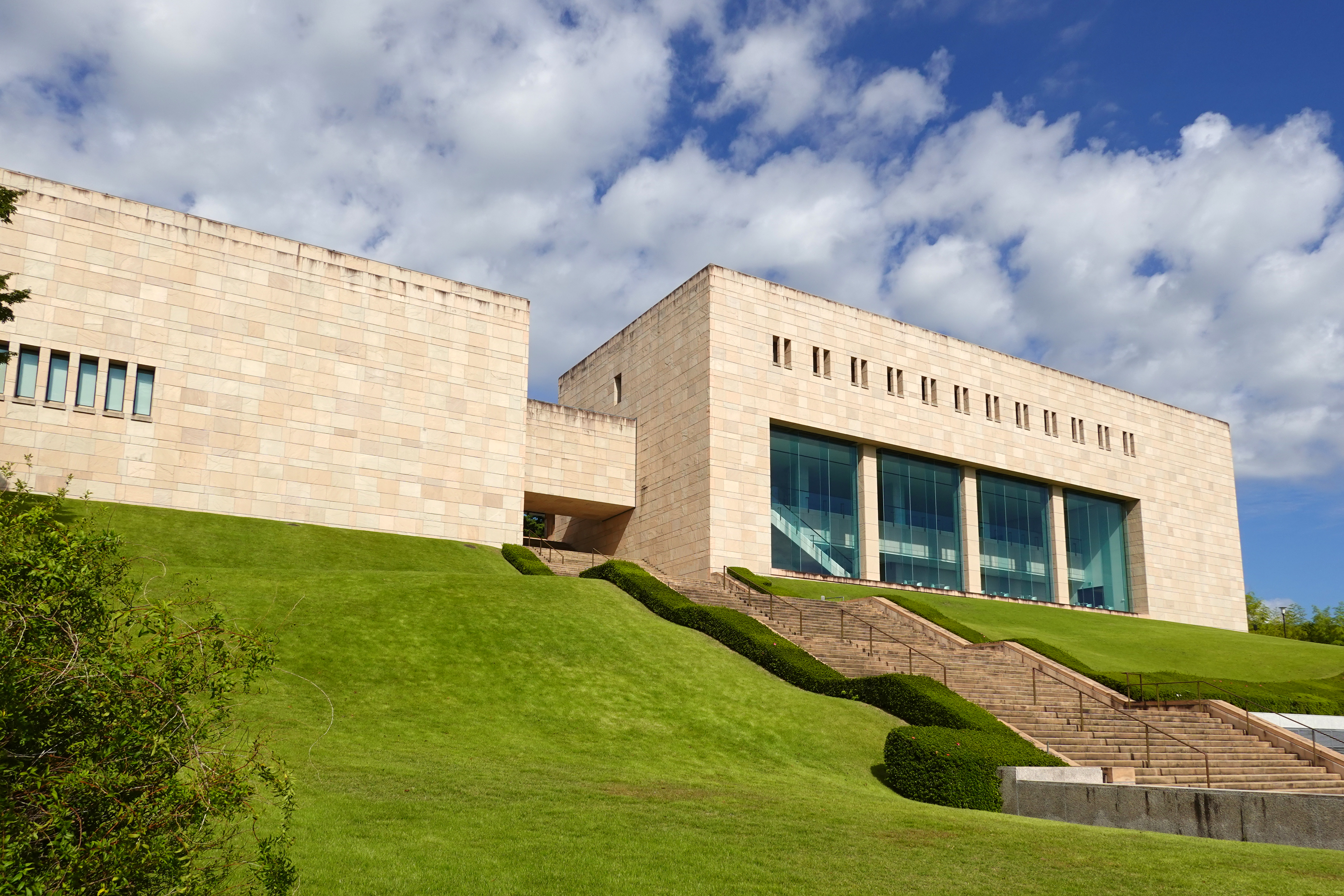
- MOA Museum of Art
- Interactive fullscreen map

General information
- Location: 26-2 Momoyama-cho, Atami, Shizuoka Prefecture, Japan
- Coordinates: 35°06′34″N 139°04′31″E
- Opened: 1982
- Renovated: 2017

Technical details
- Floor count: 3 above ground

Website
- www.moaart.or.jp/en/about/

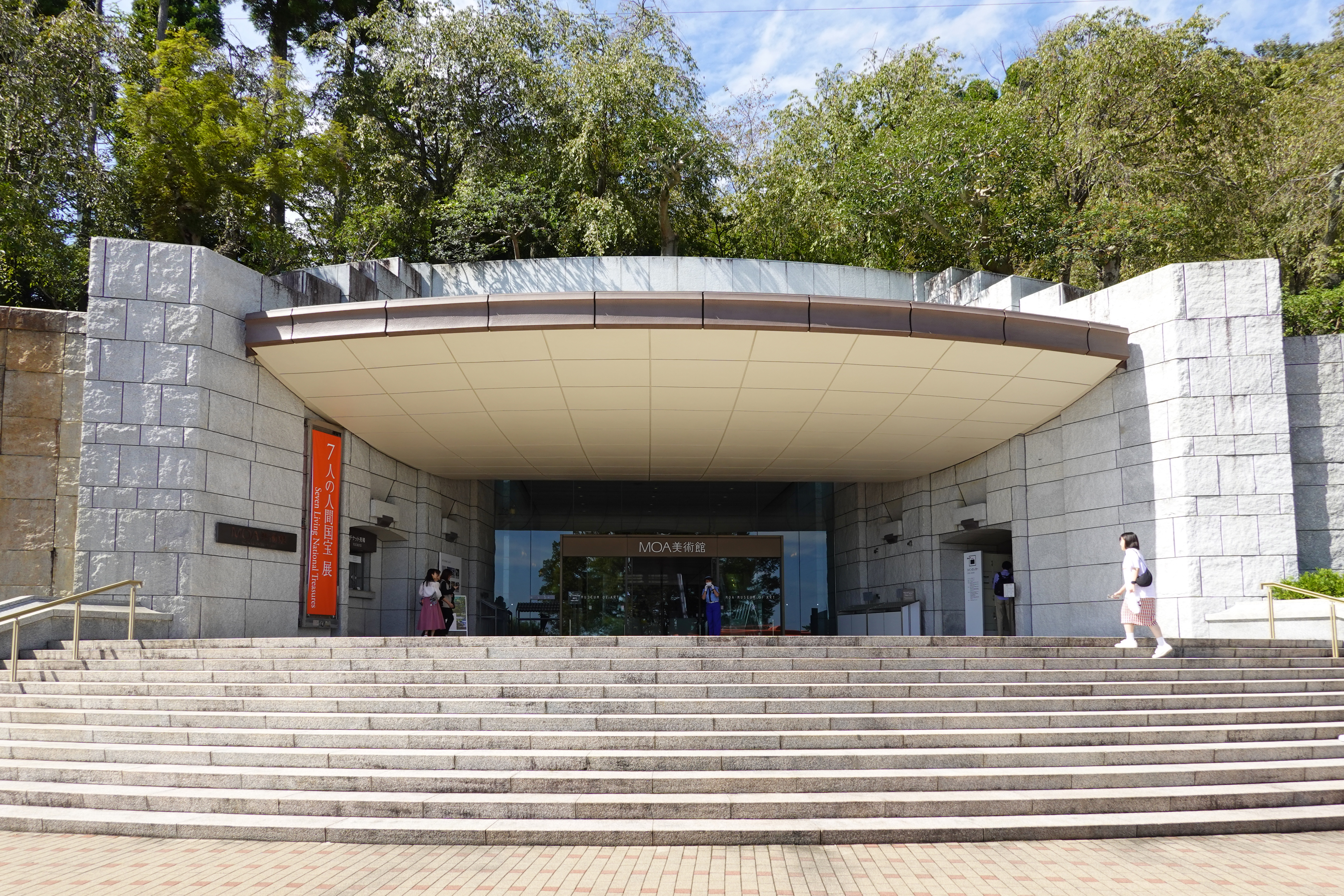

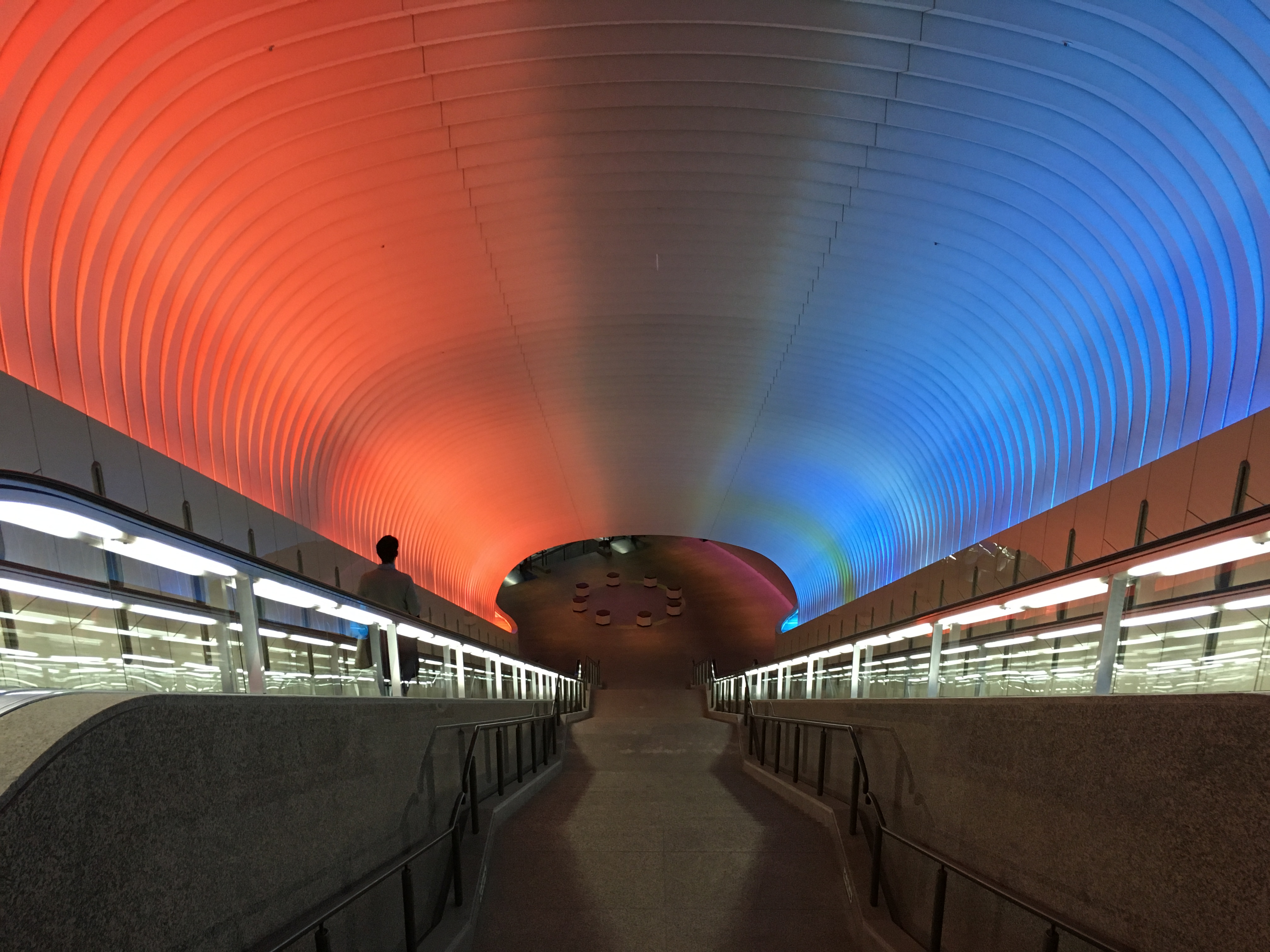

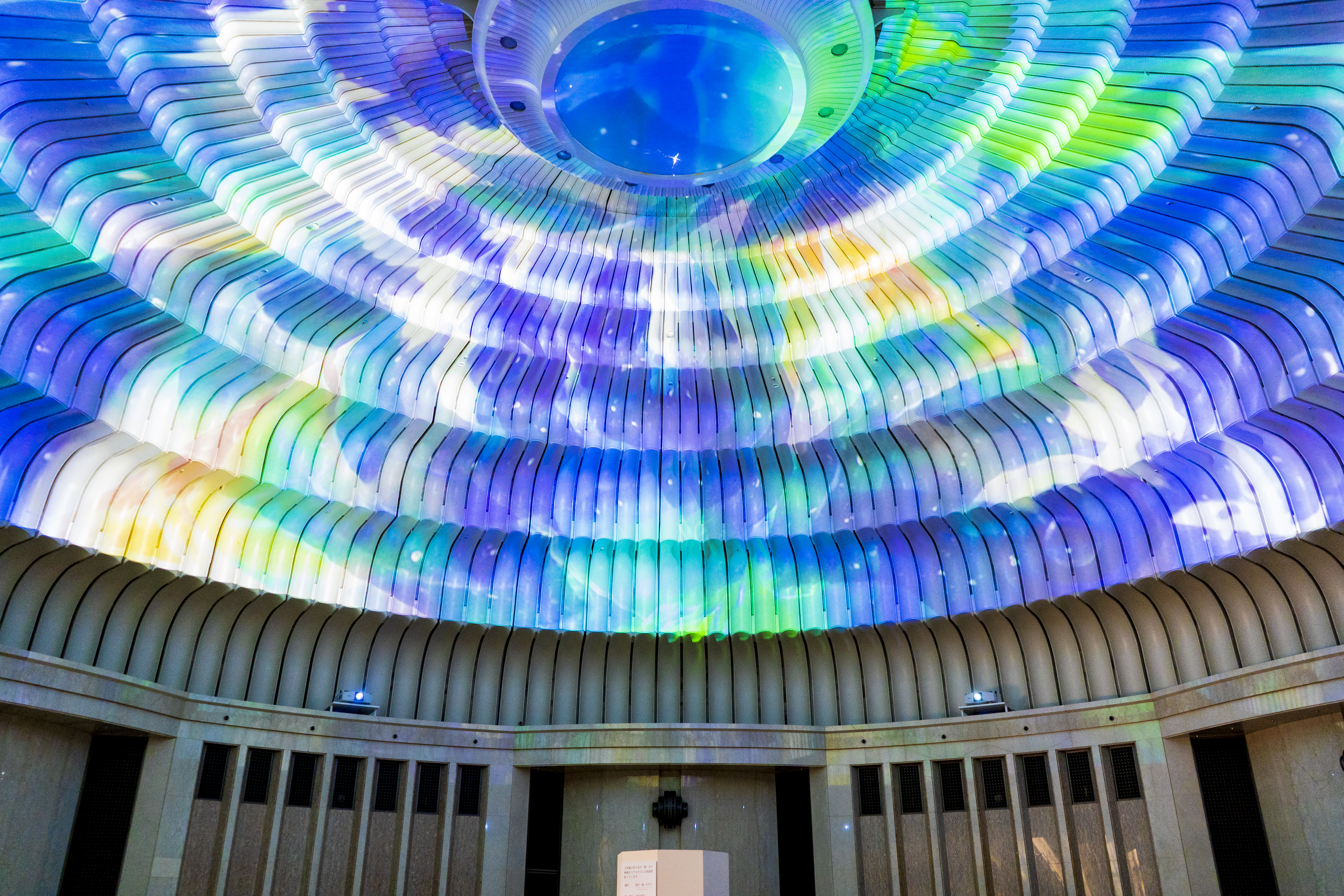

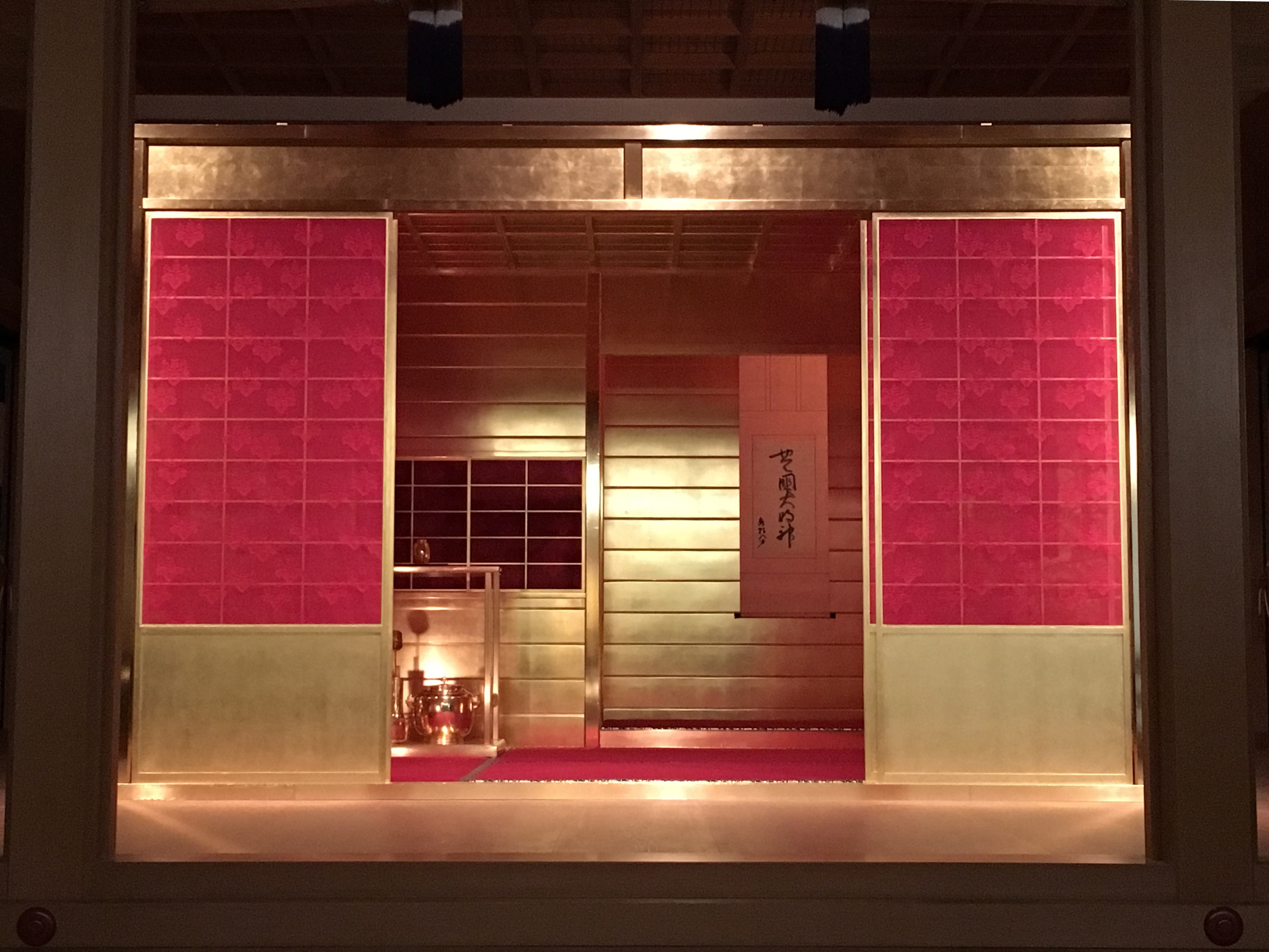
Golden Tea Room

The MOA Museum of Art (エムオーエー美術館, MOA Bijūtsukan) is a private museum in the city of Atami, Japan. The museum is the second museum established to house the art collection of Mokichi Okada, the founder of the Church of World Messianity (世界救世教, Sekai Kyūseikyō), and was founded in 1982. The first museum, the Hakone Museum of Art (ja), was established in 1952 and is still in operation; the second museum, the Atami Museum of Art, was established in 1957 and is the predecessor of the museum.

== Collection ==
The collection covers a wide range of Japanese paintings, hanging scrolls, Japanese sculptures, Japanese pottery and porcelain, Japanese lacquerware. The collection of the museum consists of approximately 3,500 works of art that include three National Treasures (Red and White Plum Blossoms screen by Ogata Kōrin, Nonomura Ninsei's Tea-leaf Jar with design or wisteria, and a Calligraphy Album "Tekagami Kanboku-jo" which is an album of ancient calligraphy from the Nara to Muromachi periods), as well as 67 Important Cultural Properties and 46 Important Art Objects (重要美術品, Jūyō bijutsuhin).

The museum owns three masterpieces of gorgeous, long and "extremely colorful" ("gokusaishiki") emakimono (picture scrolls), Yamanaka Tokiwa Monogatari Emaki (山中常盤物語絵巻), Jōruri Monogatari Emaki (浄瑠璃物語絵巻), and Horie Monogatari Emaki (堀江物語絵巻), which were created by Iwasa Matabei and his workshop based on the text of jōruri (traditional Japanese narrative music). The first two of these works have been designated as Important Cultural Properties. Yamanaka Tokiwa Monogatari tells the story of Ushiwaka's revenge for the murder of his mother, Tokiwa Gozen. Jōruri Monogatari depicts a romantic story involving Ushiwaka. Horie Monogatari tells the story of Horie Saburo's child who seeks revenge for the death of his parents.

The museum also has a reconstruction of the 16th century Golden Tea Room, which was made under the supervision of the architect Sutemi Horiguchi, an expert of sukiya architecture.

Red and White Plum Blossoms by Ogata Kōrin (National Treasure)

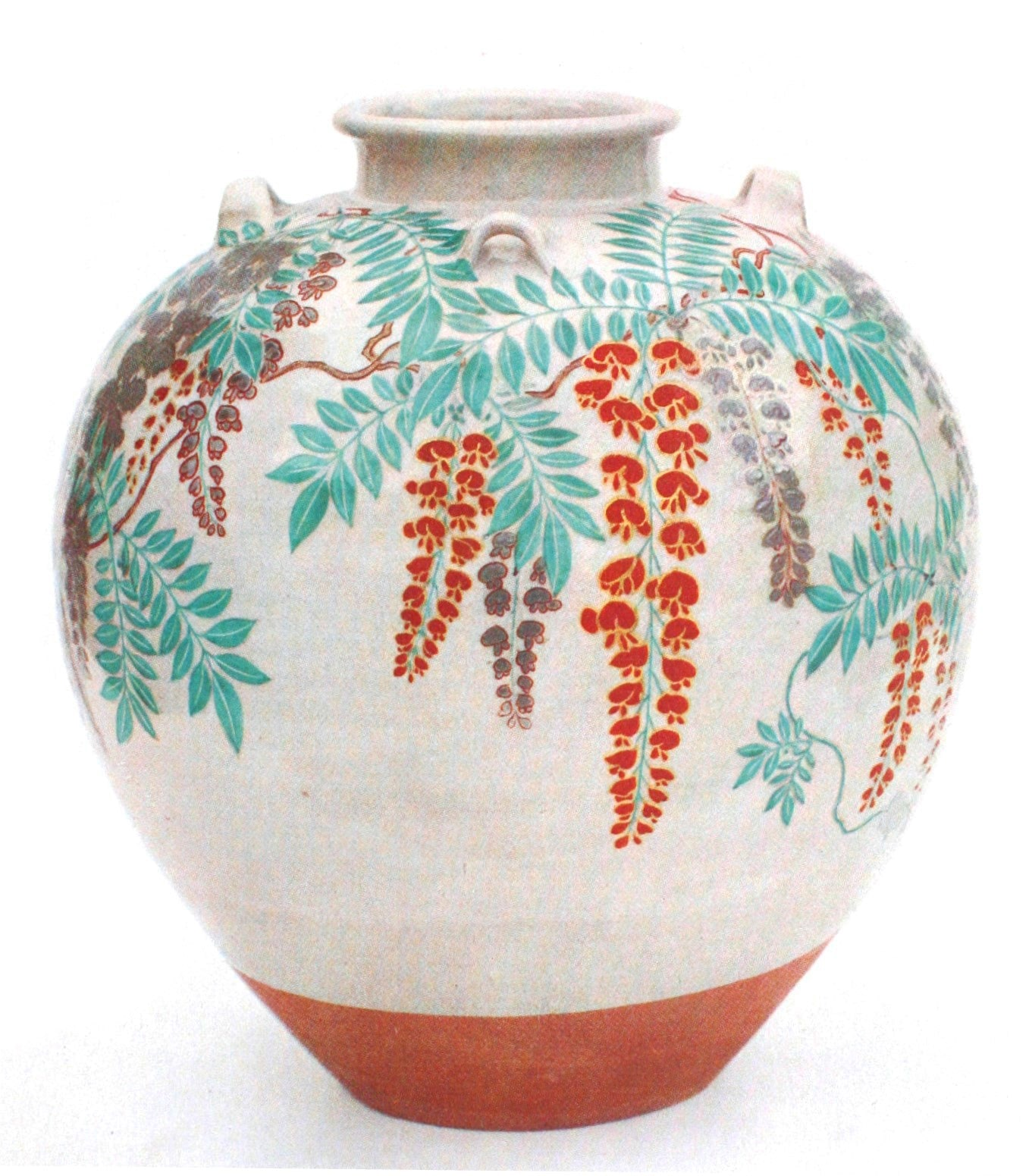
Tea-leaf jar with a design of wisteria by Ninsei, Edo period (National Treasure)

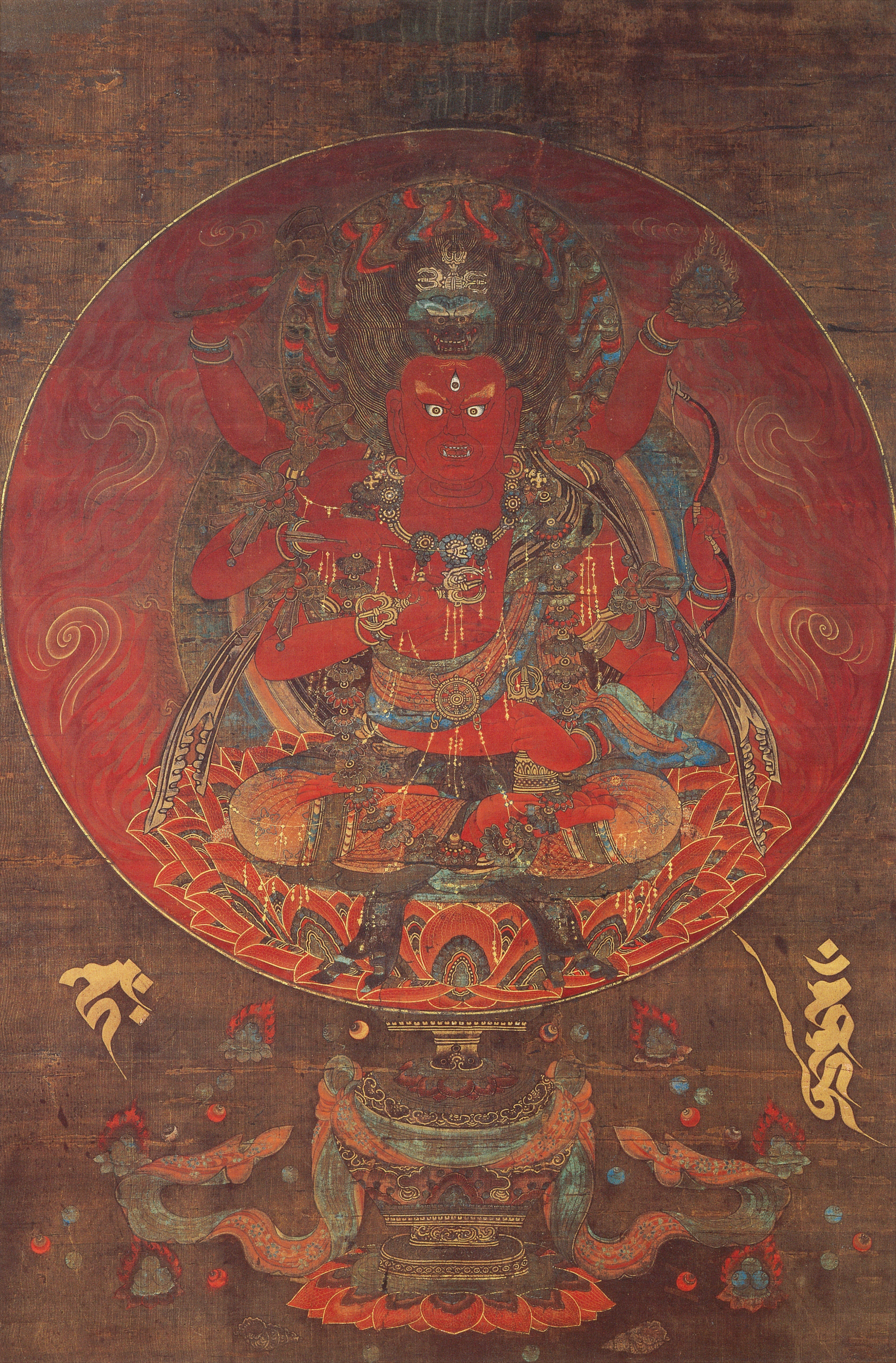
Rāgarāja, 1327, Important Cultural Property

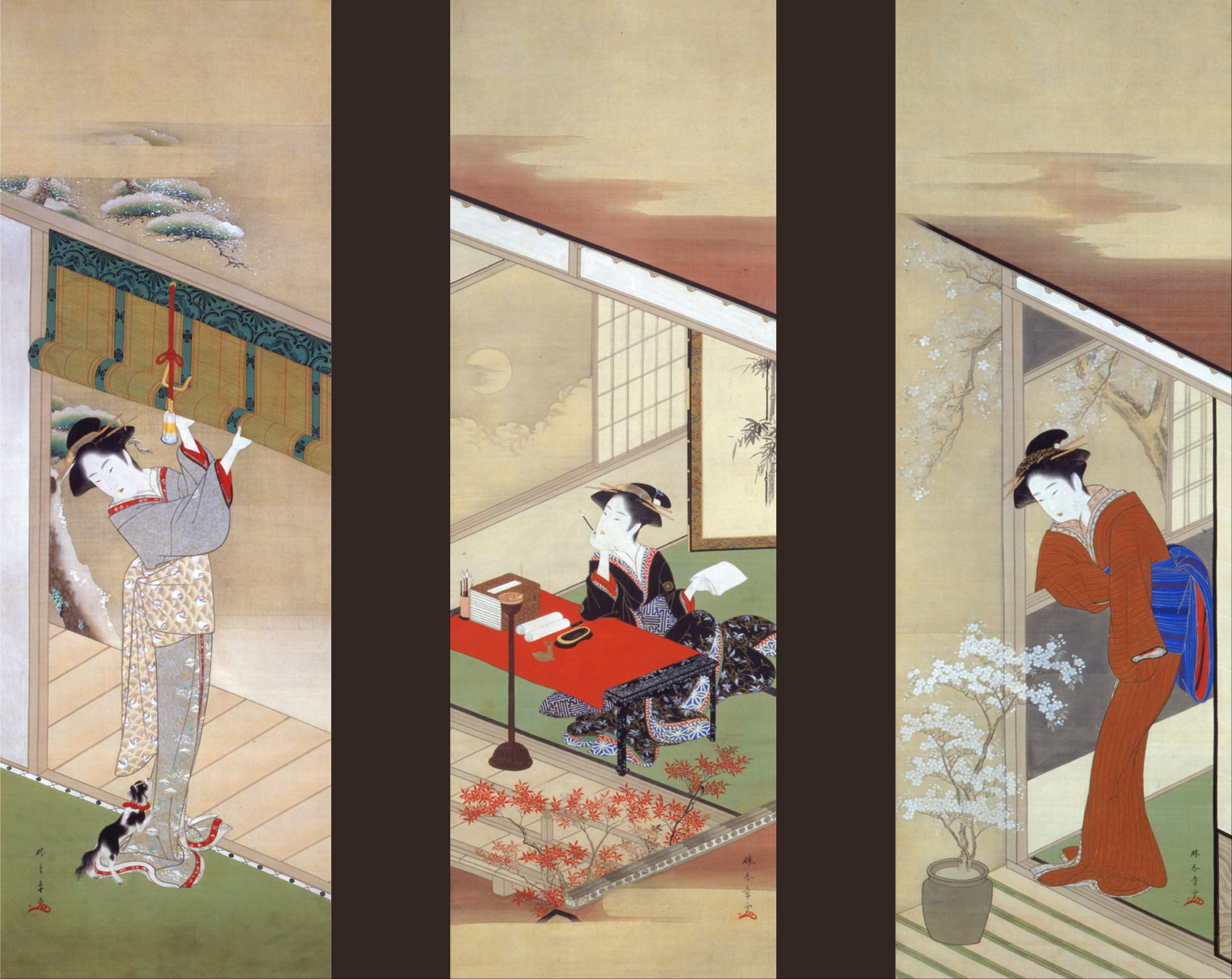
Women in Seasons of Snow, Moon and Flower by Katsukawa Shunshō, Important Cultural Property

== See also ==
- List of National Treasures of Japan (paintings)
- List of National Treasures of Japan (writings)
- List of National Treasures of Japan (crafts-others)
