= Ninsei =

Japanese potter active in mid-1600s

Ninsei (仁清) was a Japanese potter, who lived in the Edo Period, roughly between the 1640s to the 1690s. He was born Nonomura Seisuke (野々村), and later received the first name Seiemon (清右衛門). He was later bestowed with the artistic name Ninsei, with a seal.

== Biography ==
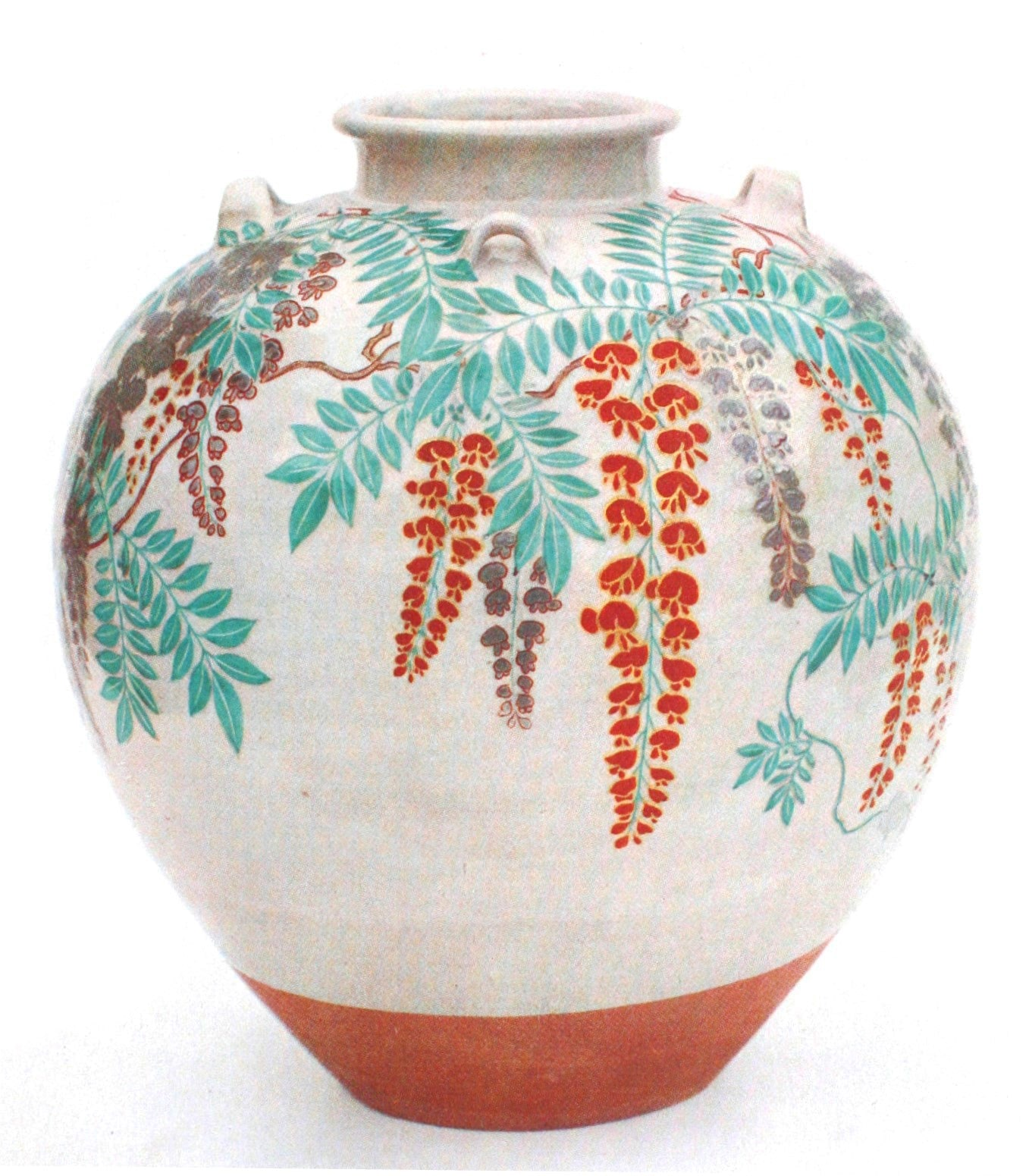
Tea-leaf jar with a design of wisteria by Ninsei, Edo period (National Treasure)

Little is known directly about his life; he is believed to have been born in the village of Tamba, near Tachikui in Hyogo Prefecture, near Kobe.

He is associated with Kyō ware, often being credited as one of the key founders and influencers. He was a master craftsman who perfected the colourful painted pottery in Kyoto. After learning the technique of making tea jars in Seto, around the Shōhō era (1644-1648) he opened the Omuro kiln in front of the gate of Ninnaji Temple. Tea master Kanamori Sowa (Shigechika) heaped high praise for his excellent potter's wheel technology and Kyoto-style design. In response to orders from the public and daimyō families his ware became popular with Japanese tea ceremony.

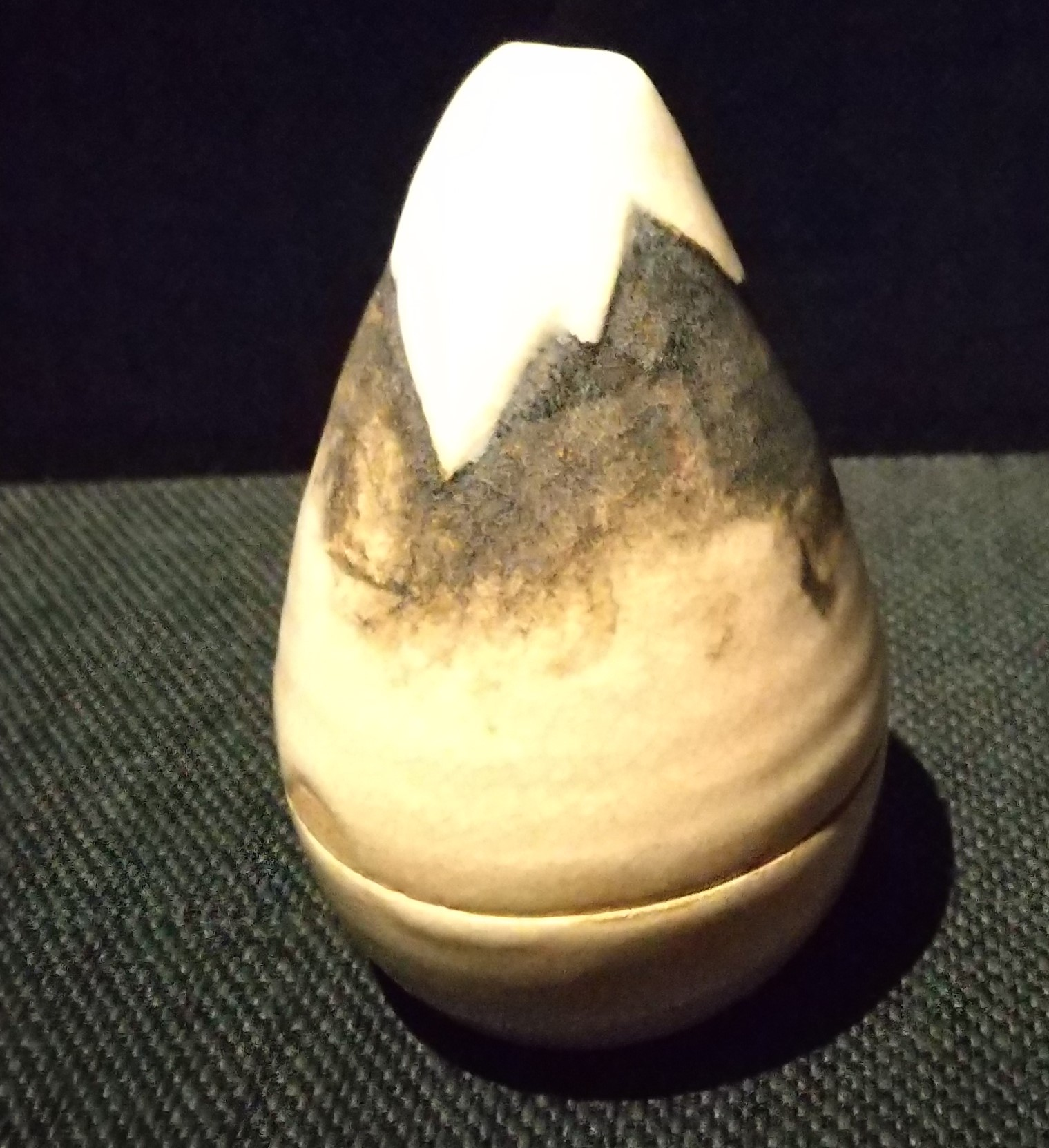
Nonomura Ninsei, Eggplant-Shaped Incense container.

He is also believed to have had a son, nicknamed "Ninsei II", who attempted to succeed him in his work, but did not reach the same level.
