= Red and White Plum Blossoms =

Folding screen painting by Ogata Kōrin

Red and White Plum Blossoms, Ogata Kōrin, early 18th century

Red and White Plum Blossoms (紙本金地著色紅白梅図 shihonkinjichakushoku kōhakubaizu) is an early 18th-century painting on a pair of two-panel byōbu folding screens by Japanese artist Ogata Kōrin (1658–1716). The simple, stylized composition depicts a patterned flowing river with a white plum tree on the left and a red one on the right. The plum blossoms indicate the scene occurs in spring.

The work is one of the best-known paintings in Japan, where it is a registered National Treasure. It resides in the MOA Museum of Art in the city of Atami in Shizuoka Prefecture.

== Description ==
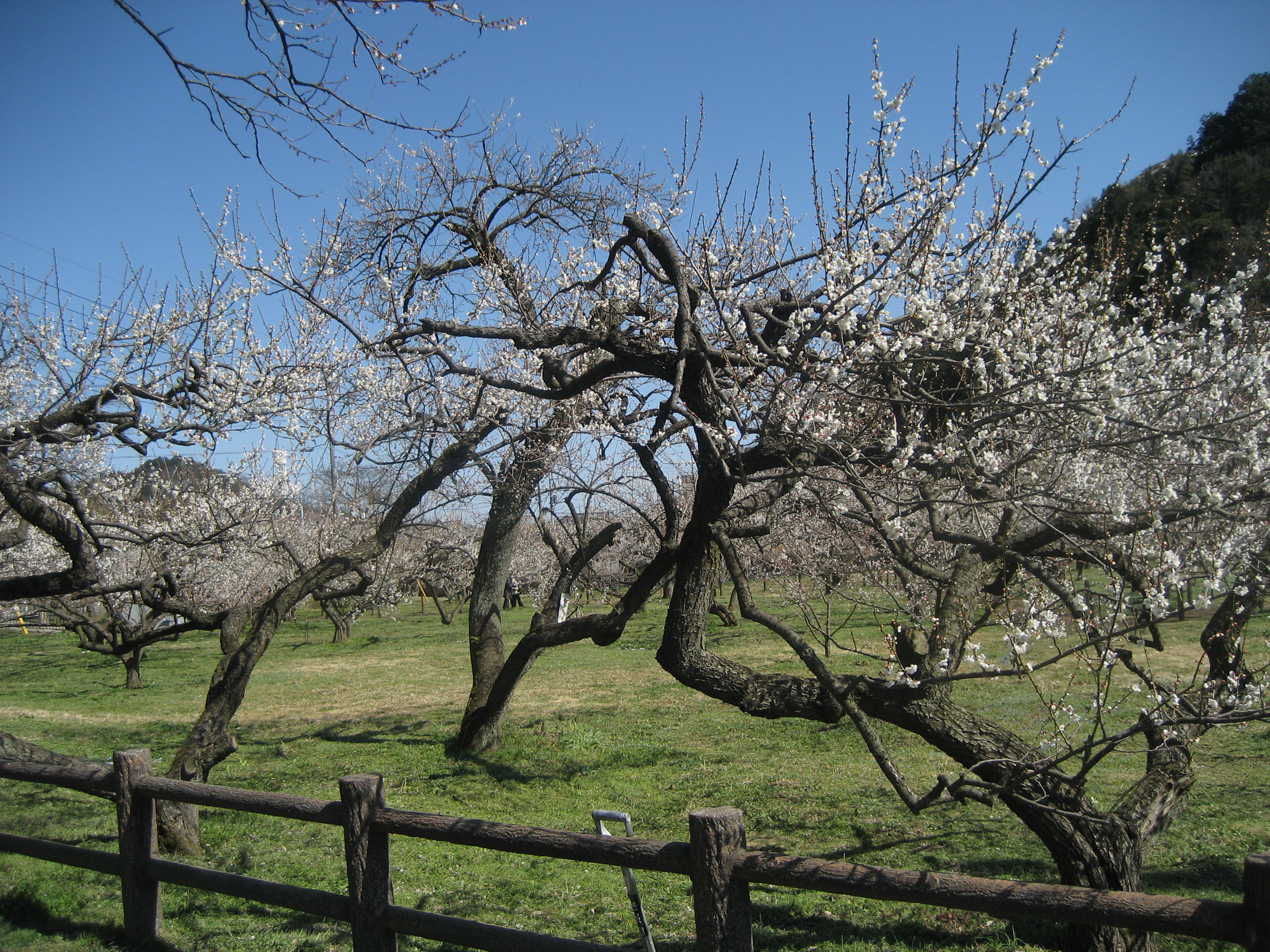
Kōrin depicts stylized prunus mume trees.

The simple, stylized composition of Red and White Plum Blossoms depicts a patterned flowing river with a white plum tree on the left and a red plum tree on the right. The plum blossoms indicate the scene occurs in spring.

The work is undated, (Note: Only three of Kōrin's works are dated.) but believed to be from Ogata's later period, and probably one of his final works. Based on evidence such as the signature, technique, and composition, art historian Yūzō Yamane dates the work to 1714 or 1715, just before the artist's death. The seal Hōshuku (Note: 方祝 Hōshuku) appears on both screens, but each has a different signature: Hokkyō Kōrin (Note: 法橋光琳 Hokkyō Kōrin) on the left and Sei Sei Kōrin (Note: 青々光琳 Sei Sei Kōrin) on the right, the latter a signature he began to use after he left Edo, which he visited between 1704 and 1709.

It is in coloured pigments on paper placed on a pair of two-panel byōbu folding screens. Each screen measures 156.5 × 172.5 centimetres (61.6 × 67.9 in). Kōrin achieved the mottling texture on the trees using tarashikomi, a technique in which the painter applies a second layer of pigment or ink before the first layer has dried. The work is considered exemplary of the Rinpa school that Kōrin cofounded.

Subsequent to earlier analyses suggesting the presence only of organic pigments and dyes, a second phase of investigation was conducted between 2008 and 2010 using more advanced analytical instruments. Funded by a Japanese government research grant, this study was led by Prof. Izumi Nakai at the Tokyo University of Science. The team used X-ray fluorescence and related non-destructive methods to analyze the screens. Their findings included confirmation that the background was indeed created with gold leaf and that silver was detected in the river section. In October 2011, further analysis was conducted at the MOA Museum of Art, and at a presentation that December, the following results were announced: the background consists of gold leaf; the central river was entirely covered in silver leaf; the black areas are silver sulfide; and traces of sulfur were detected even in parts of the river that had not visibly blackened.

== Reproducing Kōrin’s Technique ==
In response to these findings, Japanese painter and researcher Tomoki Moriyama undertook a full-scale reproduction of Red and White Plum Blossoms using historically accurate materials and methods. In his replication, the river was rendered with silver leaf, over which he brushed traditional dōsa (traditional sizing medium made from animal glue mixed with aluminium and water) to create masked wave patterns. He then applied sulfur, both as dry powder and as a dilute solution, to provoke controlled blackening of the silver. The experiment revealed that unmasked areas turned matte black (silver sulfide), while protected areas retained their brightness or, at intermediate stages, showed iridescent or ultramarine hues—suggesting that such colors might have once been visible on the original screen.

Moriyama documented that degradation of the sizing layer over time (dōsa nuke) may have allowed for unintended silver corrosion, contributing to the screen’s current appearance. His work demonstrates how brushwork, timing, and moisture all influence the transformation of silver, providing insight into how Kōrin invented a new technique to depict the flow of the river. Moriyama’s reproduction, supported by contemporary materials analysis, represents one of the most detailed efforts to reconstruct a lost visual state of a major Rinpa work.

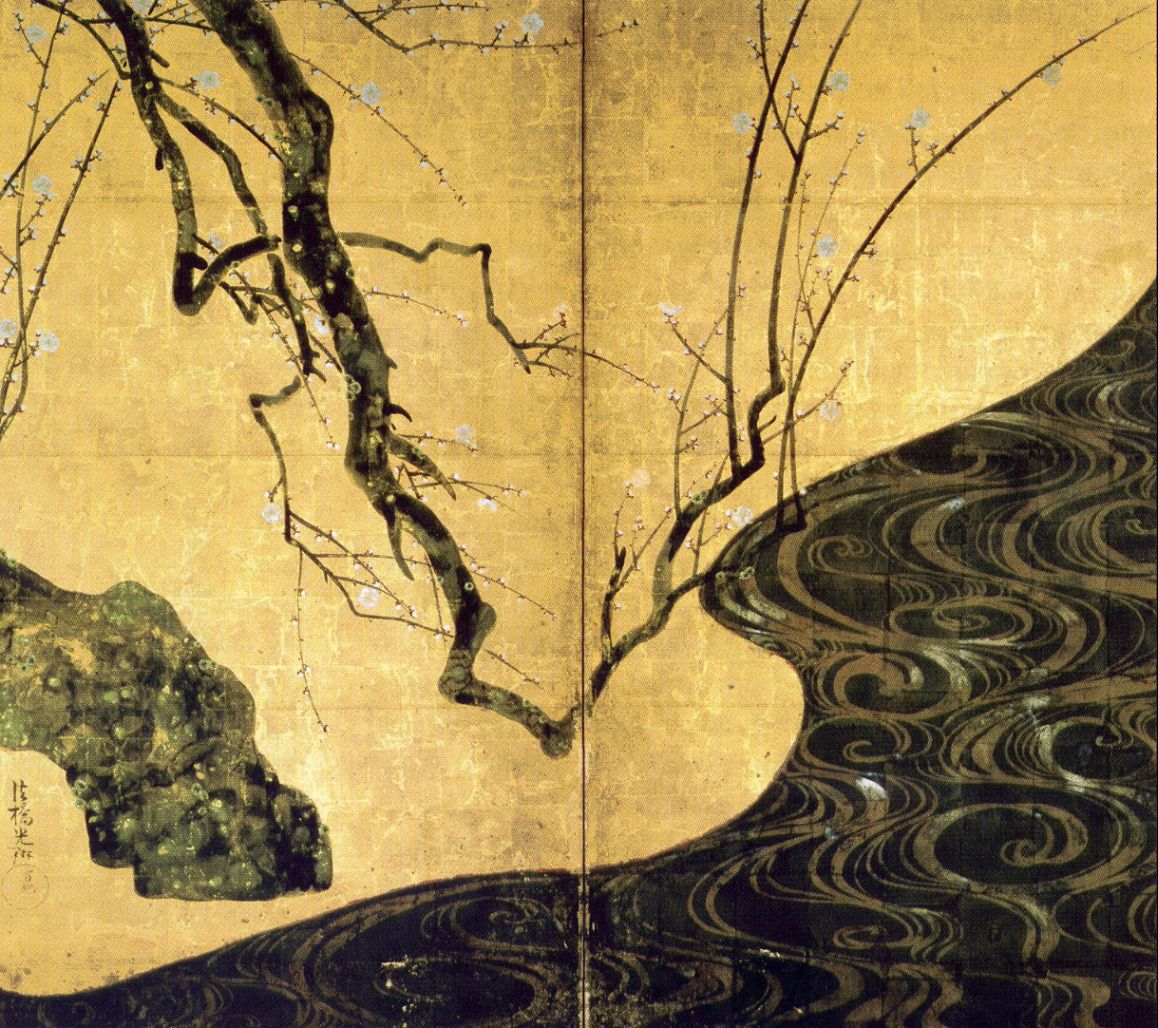

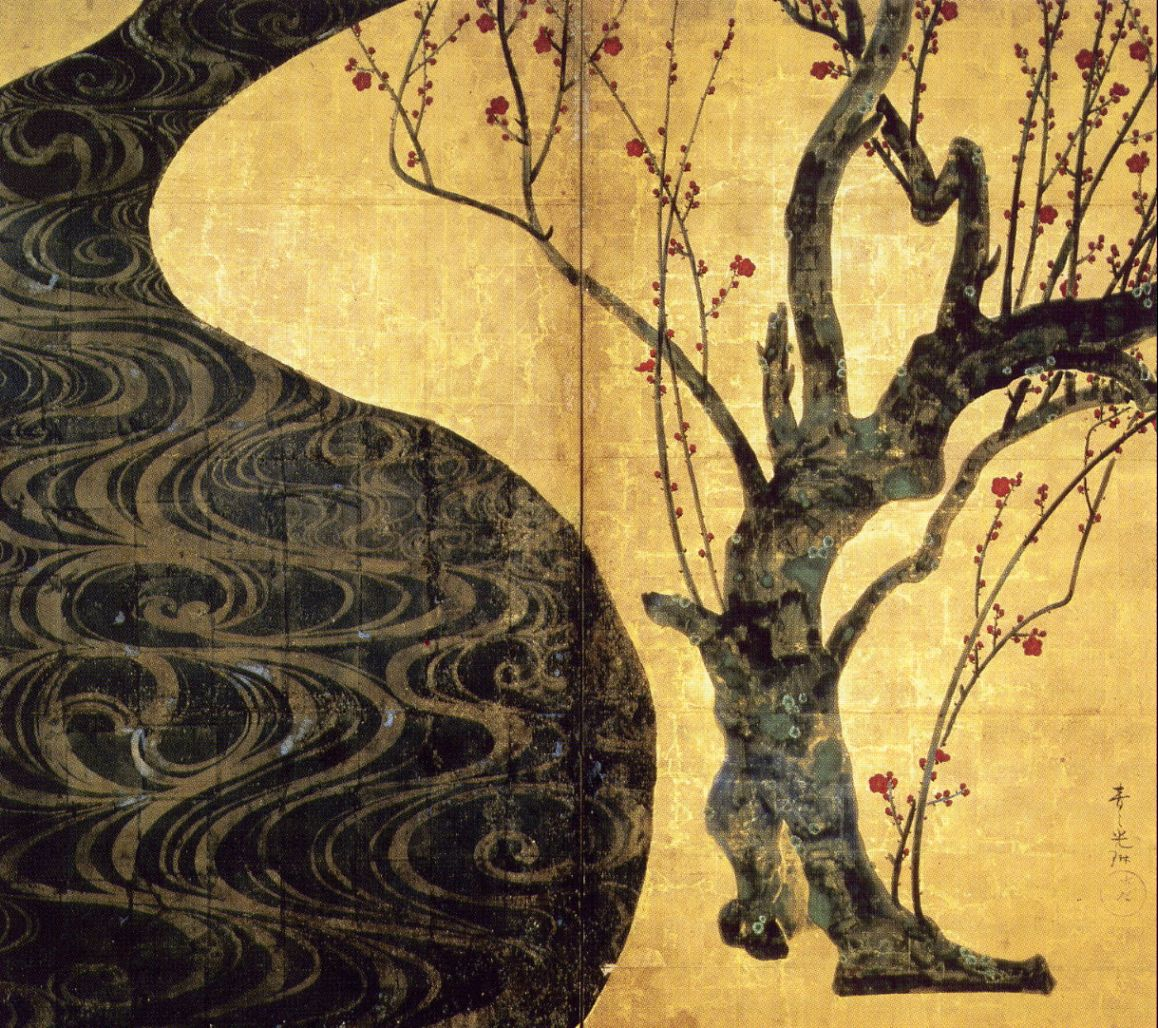

== Provenance ==
No documentation exists from before the 20th century on the commission or provenance of the screens. They receive mention in no Edo-period publications on Kōrin's works and were not copied by his followers, which suggests they were not well known. A journal article in 1907 (Note: 「尾形光琳筆 梅花図屏風に就て」 "Ogata Kōrin hitsu Baika Zu Byōbu ni tsuite", in Kokka (『國華』), issue 201, p. 569 (1907)) is the first known publication about them, and their first public display came in a 200th-anniversary exhibition of Kōrin's work in 1915.

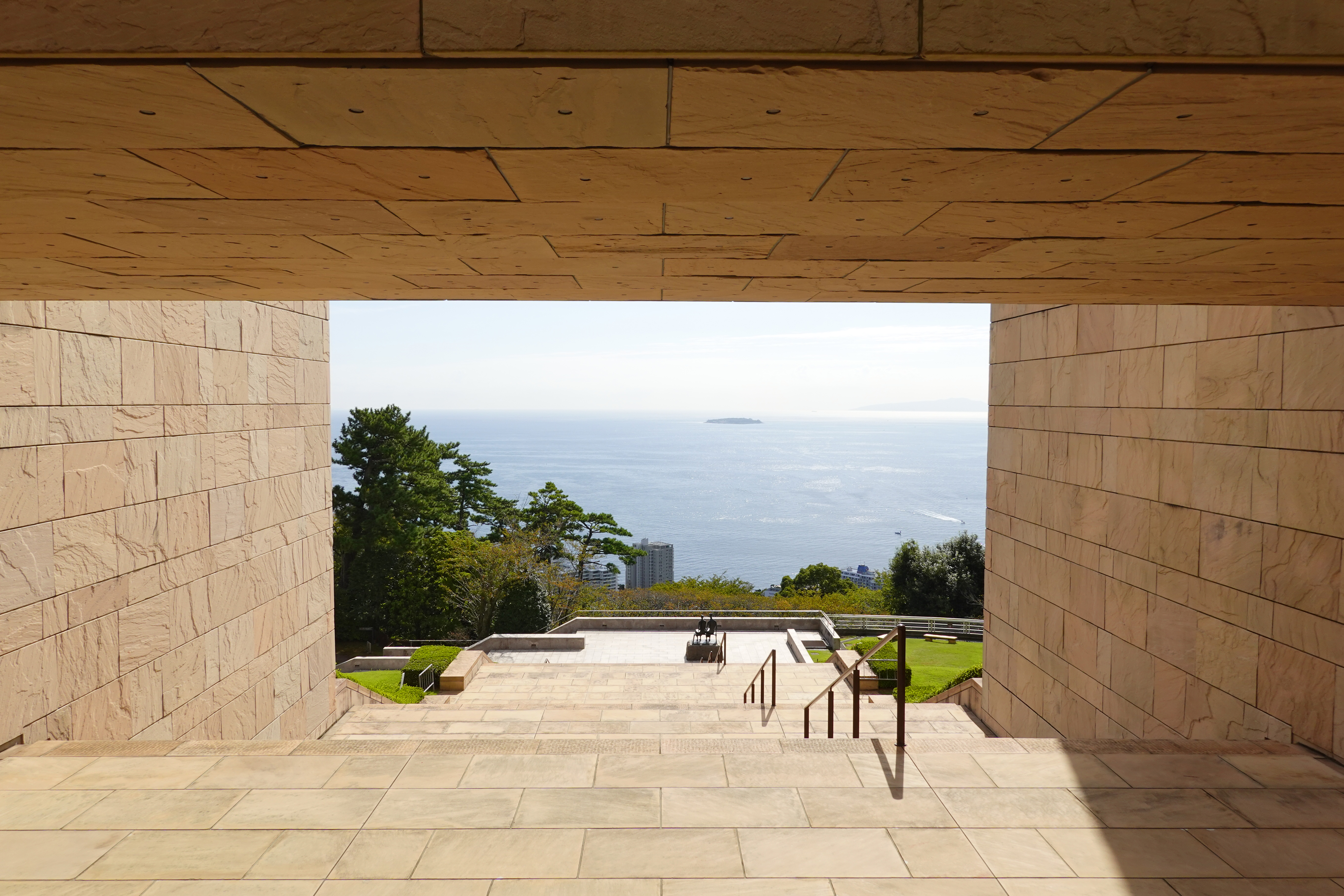
The MOA Museum of Art in the city of Atami in Shizuoka Prefecture displays the work each winter when plum blossoms are in bloom.

Mokichi Okada began negotiations to purchase the screens in 1953 with the descendants of the daimyōs of the Tsugaru clan, who may have been the original owners; the transfer was concluded in 1954. The screens reside at the MOA Museum of Art in the city of Atami in Shizuoka Prefecture, along with the rest of Okada's collection. The museum displays the screens a month per year in late winter, the season when the plum blossoms bloom. Nearby is a garden reproduction of the screens' subject: two hillocks dotted with 360 plum trees, the number of plum trees said to surround the shrine of Lin Bu, a Chinese poet renowned for writing about plum blossoms. The display attracts large crowds.

== Legacy ==
The screens are considered one of Kōrin's greatest works and are amongst the best known works of Japanese art.

The NHK historical drama Genroku Ryōran used a computer-animated version of Red and White Plum Blossoms during its opening credits.
