= Hattori Tadasaburō =

Japanese cloisonné artist

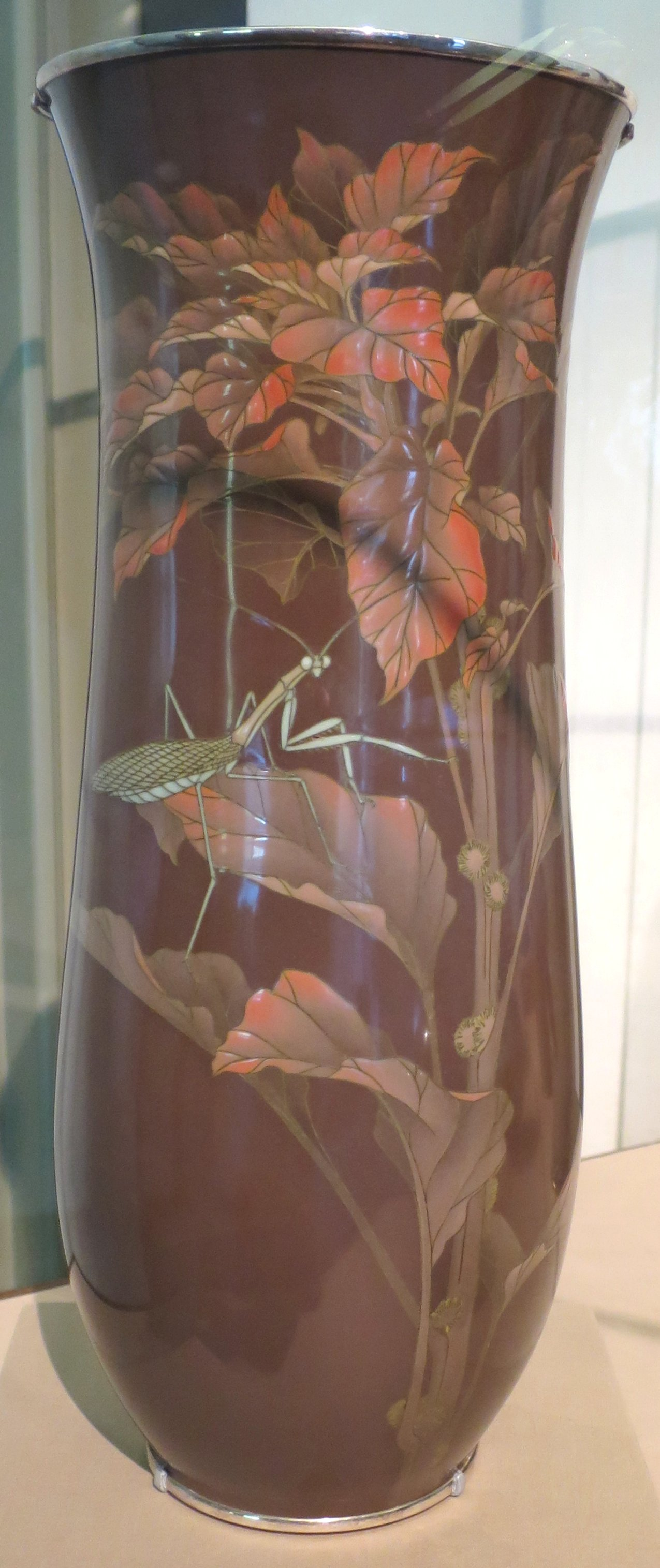
Cloisonné vase with design of praying mantis amid foliage by Hattori Tadasaburō, first quarter of 20th century (private collection)

Hattori Tadasaburō (服部唯三郎) was a Japanese cloisonné artist from Nagoya.

Along with Kawade Shibatarō, Tadasaburō developed the moriage or "piling up" technique which places layers of enamel upon each other to create a three-dimensional effect.

Many of his works are held in collections such as the Victoria & Albert Museum and the Khalili Collection of Japanese Art.

== See also ==
- Ando Jubei
- Namikawa Yasuyuki
