= Ōshima Joun =

Japanese sculptor and artist

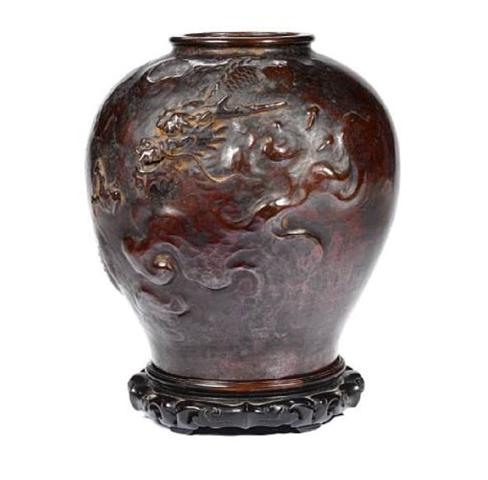
Bronze Vase by Oshima Joun

Ōshima Joun (大島如雲, Ōshima Joun; 1858 – 1940) was a Japanese sculptor and artist, noted for his great artistry and skill in bronze casting.

== Career ==
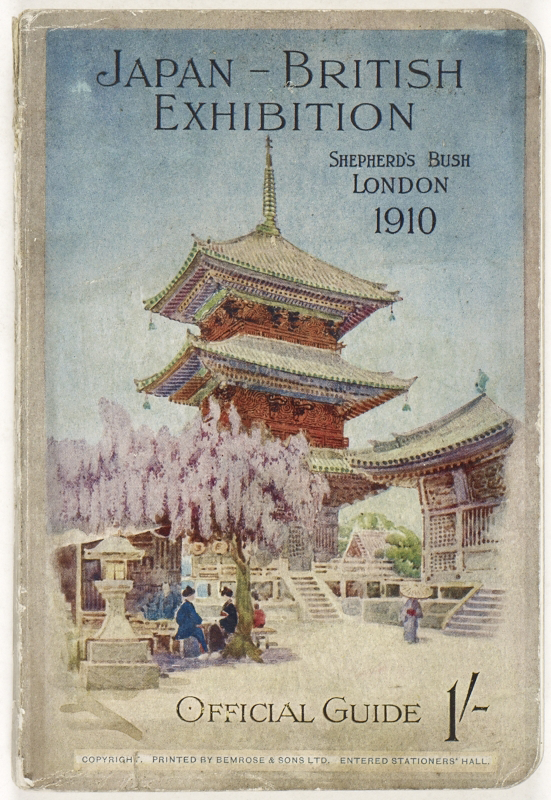
Oshima Joun exhibited at the London Japan-British Exhibition of 1910.

Joun was born to a family of metalworkers and was famous for his skill in casting bronze. He was the son of Ōshima Takajiro, whose own father Ōshima Yasubei was the first metal craftsman in the family. He was a professor at the Tokyo School of Fine Arts (東京美術学校 Tōkyō Bijutsu Gakkō; name changed in 2008 to Tokyo University of the Arts) from 1887 until 1932.

His studio, Sanseisha — run with his brother Ōshima Yasutaro, also a skilled artist — was very successful and at one point employed 11 assistants. During the period 1875 to 1879, the studio "produced some of the finest bronzes ever produced in Japan." Old labels on Joun's tomobako (wooden storage boxes) suggest that the well-established Ginza (in Tokyo) purveyor of silver and other fine metal wares Miyamoto-Shoko (established 1880) may also have handled some of Joun's sales.

Many of Joun's students (Ryūki, Chōkichi Suzuki (see mention in Victoria and Albert Museum), Sessei Okazaki, Kumazō Hasegawa, Gorosaburō Kanaya, Eisuke Jomi) went on to achieve distinction of their own. He exhibited at the 2nd National Industrial Exposition in 1881, and at the Paris Exposition Universelle (1900), and the Japan-British Exhibition of 1910.

Ōshima Joun died in Tokyo on January 4, 1940, at 83 years old.

=== Art-name ===
Ōshima Joun used the gō or art-name 一乗軒 (Ichijoken) and that inscription can be found on many of his inscribed boxes. His brother Ōshima Yasutaro was also an accomplished artist who used the art name Shokaken 笑華軒. There is uncertainty as to whether the gō Shokaken may have also been used by Joun’s father. Additionally, a small group of bronzes (which appear to be made for export) have been identified that are signed Shokaken. While these signatures have an identical pronunciation, they differ by the use of a different (single) character 笑花軒 and are believed to be associated with the Ōshima family.

The Ōshima Joun obituary at the National Research Institute for Cultural Properties and Francis Brinkley's 1902 Japan: Its History, Arts, and Literature, says that Ōshima Joun was an art name taken by Ōshima Katsujiro.

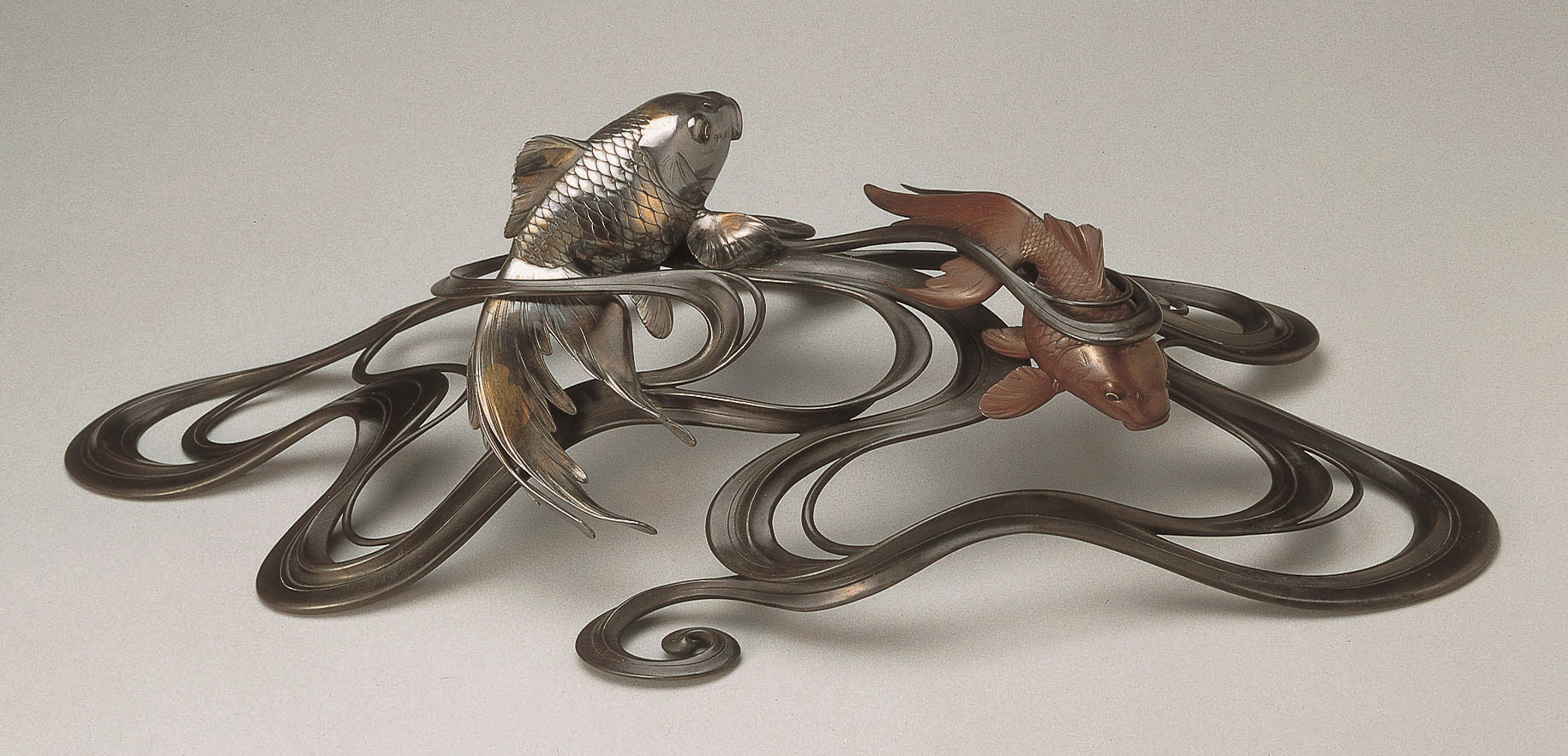
Okimono of fish in waves in the Khalili Collection of Japanese Art
