= Japan–British Exhibition =

1910 Japanese exhibition in Great Britain

Coordinates: 51.511°N 0.224°W

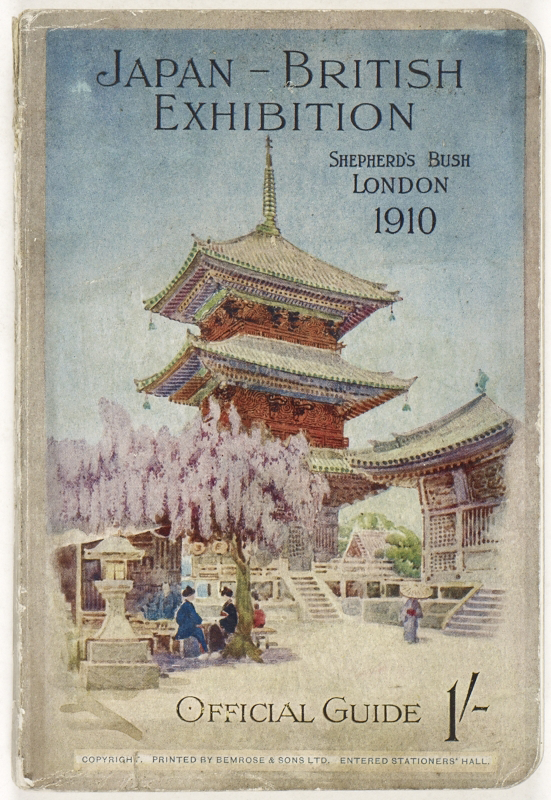
Japan–British Exhibition Guidebook

The Japan-British Exhibition of 1910 (日英博覧会, Nichi-Ei Hakuran-kai) took place at White City, London, from 14 May 1910 to 29 October 1910. It was the largest international exposition that the Empire of Japan had ever participated in. The exhibition was driven by the Japanese government's desire to shake off disparaging views of Japan in the Western world, legitimize Japan's rising prestige as an imperial power in Asia, and to generally develop a more favorable public image in the West following the renewal of the Anglo-Japanese Alliance.

Japan also hoped that the display of manufactured products would lead to increased Japanese trade with Britain. The formal annexation of Korea occurred during the exhibition in August 1910, and was celebrated with a lantern procession on the site. Through the exhibition and its colonial displays, Japan thus made a successful effort to display its new status as a great power by emphasizing its position as an ostensibly 'civilized nation' and an 'efficient colonial administrator' in a manner that paralleled Western empires.

== Background ==
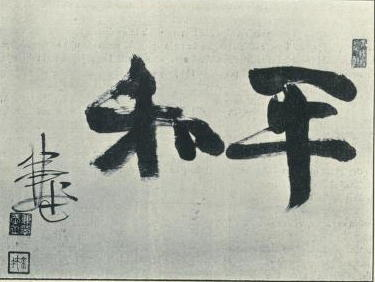
Japanese calligraphy, the word "peace" and the signature of the calligrapher, Baron Ōura Kanetake, 1910

Hosting an international exhibition around the turn of the 20th century was a means for a rising empire like Japan to demonstrate it was a world power, showcasing its industrial might, prestige and hegemony, similarly to the 1850 Great Exhibition in Britain and the United States' hosting of the 1904 St Louis World's Fair. There had been earlier attempts prior to the Japan-Britain Exhibition, such as in 1890, to celebrate Japan's 2550th year of establishment. This was however, eventually shelved due to financial and political considerations as Japan was still trying to renegotiate its unequal treaties with the Western powers. After the Russo-Japanese War in 1905, there was yet another suggestion for an exhibition to be held in Tokyo. At the earlier 1904 St Louis World's Fair itself, Japan participated and sought to use its exhibits to both distinguish itself from other Asian nations under Western colonial rule and to showcase its own paternalistic imperial dominance over Asia, including China and Formosa (Taiwan).

A proposal was made in 1908 for an exhibition to be held in London to celebrate and reinforce the Anglo-Japanese Alliance on a grass-roots level. It was strongly supported by Japanese Foreign Minister Jutaro Komura, who was aware that there still was a general conception in the West of Japan as a backward and undeveloped country, despite the Boxer Rebellion and the Russo-Japanese War. The Japanese Diet voted an enormous sum to sponsor the exhibition in 1909, despite the fact that the Treasury had been drained from the Russo-Japanese War, and the economy was on the verge of bankruptcy.

Baron Ōura Kanetake, who was then Minister of Agriculture and Commerce, was the President of the Japanese committee organizing the exhibition. His British counterpart was Henry Fitzalan-Howard, 15th Duke of Norfolk.

The Japanese display covered 242,700 square feet (22,550 m^{2}), three times the space Japan occupied at the previous Paris Exhibition of 1900, not including an additional 222,877 square feet (20,706.0 m^{2}) for two large Japanese gardens. There were some 2,271 Japanese exhibitors.

The Imperial Japanese Navy sent the Japanese-built cruiser Ikoma (which was anchored at Gravesend in Kent) to underscore that the Anglo-Japanese Alliance was primarily a naval alliance and to stress that Japan was a formidable military power worthy of partnership with Great Britain.

A visit by Queen Alexandra in mid-March, in advance of the opening, added publicity and royal prestige to the exhibition. The death of King Edward VII caused the opening to be delayed until 14 May. By the time the event closed on 29 October, over 8 million visitors had attended.

The exhibition was widely known in London as 'the Japanese Exhibition' rather than 'the Japan–British Exhibition', as there was minimal British content.

== Exhibits ==
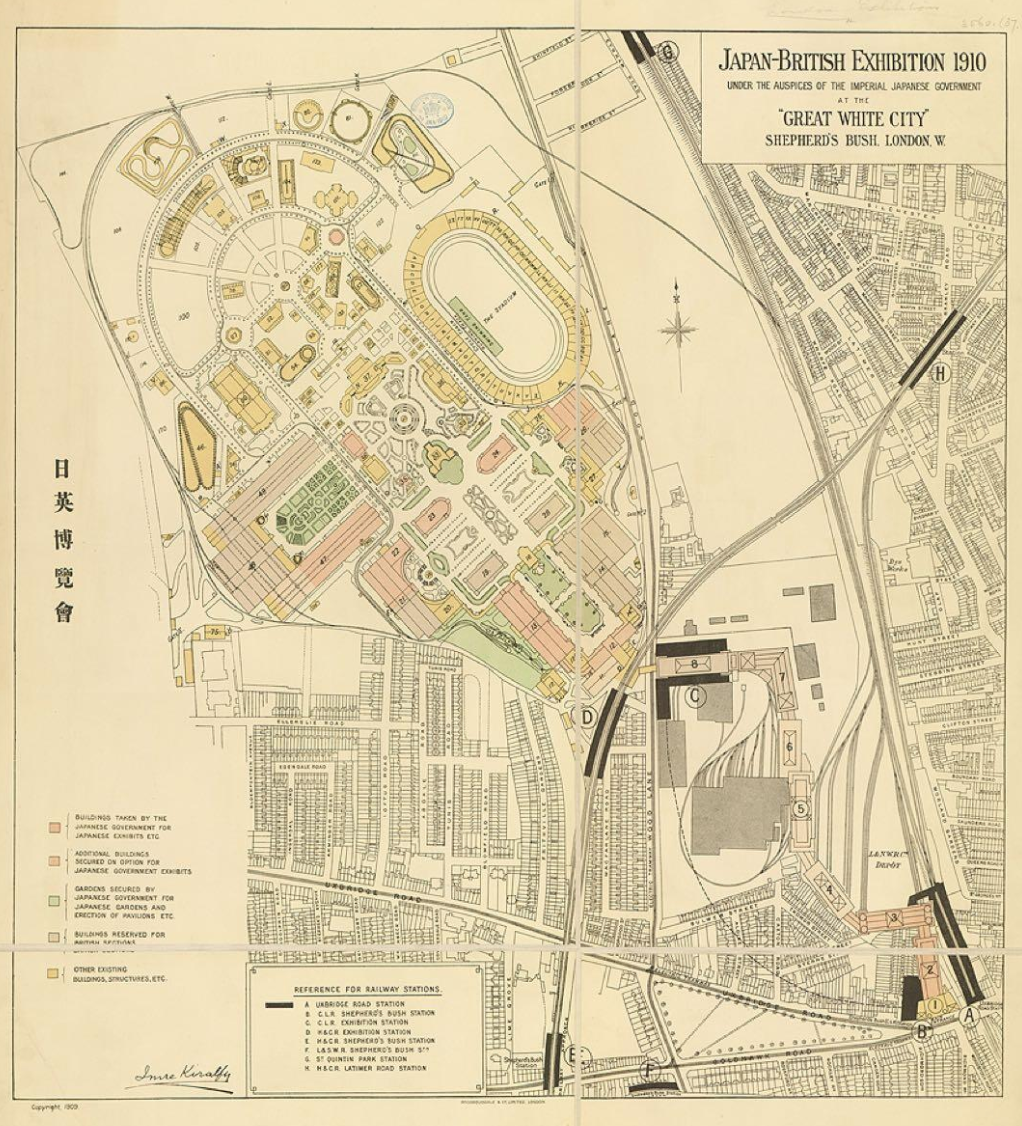
Japan British Exhibition Map 1910

The Japanese gardens had to be constructed from scratch at the exhibition site. Since authenticity was regarded as of the utmost importance, trees, shrubs, wooden buildings, bridges, and even stones were brought in from Japan.

One of the many aims of the exhibition was to introduce the civilization of Japan to the western world, showing past, recent present and projected future. The intent was to show that Japan was not a country that had suddenly leapt from a state of semi-barbarism to one of high civilization in the middle of the nineteenth century, but had always been “progressive”, and that the modernization of Japan since 1868 was only a natural progression. This was illustrated with twelve impressively full-sized dioramas with wax figures, showing the progression of Japanese history.

Each of the Japanese government ministries was represented, along with the Japanese Red Cross and the post office, showing displays of the modern systems and facilities used by the governmental departments.

Displays about Taiwan, Korea, the Kwantung Leased Territory, and indigenous people from Japan's colonies were meant to demonstrate that Japan was following in Great Britain's footsteps as an imperial power to improve the lives of the ‘natives’ in its colonial territories, as was common in imperial exhibitions that showcased the racial, cultural and technological supremacy of Western colonial empires, such as the St Louis World's Fair, where over 1,000 Filipinos were 'displayed'. The 'native villages' displayed in the amusement side of the Japan-Britain Exhibition included Aboriginal Taiwanese and Ainu people from Hokkaido. One of the members of the Aboriginal Taiwanese group, Ruji Suruchan, died from an illness while there, and was buried in an unmarked mass grave in the Margravine Cemetery in Hammersmith, being recorded in the British burial registry as "Ruggi Swinehard" and in the Japanese papers, he was mistakenly identified as a woman.

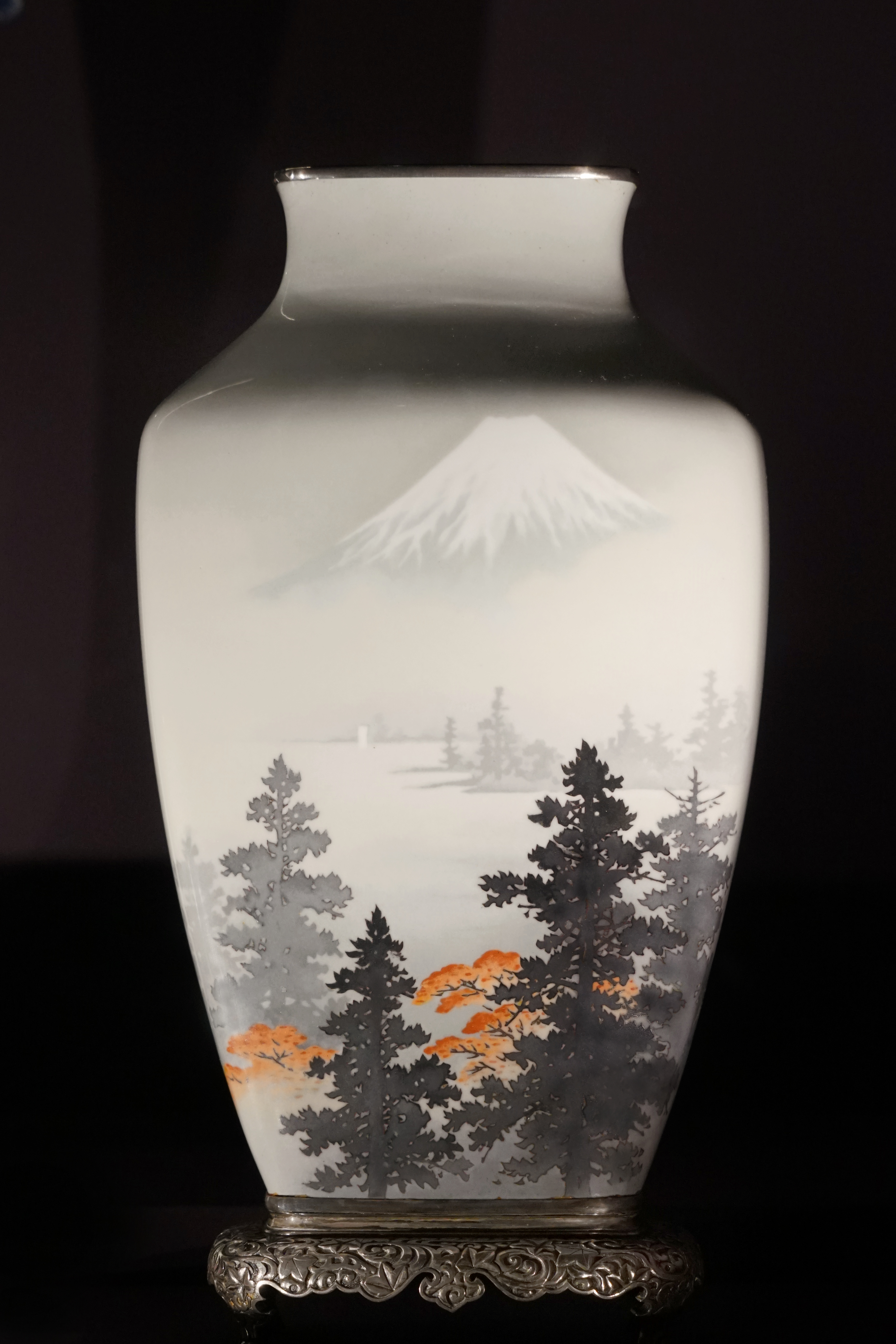
Vase by Kawade Shibatarō that was exhibited in London, now in the Khalili Collection of Japanese Art

Almost 500 Japanese firms sent items to London. Care was taken only to display the highest possible quality, to offset popular images that Japanese products were cheaply made and tawdry.

Artists represented included ceramicists Yabu Meizan and Miyagawa Kozan as well as the cloisonné artists Namikawa Sōsuke, Kawade Shibatarō and Ando Jubei. Lacquer artist Tsujimura Shoka (1867–1929) won a gold medal for a box decorated in hiramaki-e with a stylised depiction of an asunaro plant. The Samurai Shokai Company won a gold medal for a set of metalwork pieces.

There was an element of Japan being perceived as a nation of 'quaint backwardness' in the selection of art: paintings that were made by Japanese artists trained in modern Western techniques were rejected, in favour of art perceived to be wholly and traditionally Japanese in style.

In addition to manufactured goods, traditional and modern fine arts, and arts and crafts were well represented, including nihonga (Japanese-style) and yōga (Western-style) painting, sculpture, lacquerwares, and woodcuts. One of the most popular craftsmen in the exhibition was Horikawa Kozan, a celebrated potter. He was invited to demonstrate pottery-making and repair priceless antiquities, some of which had been in the possession of British collectors for generations.

A sumo exhibition tournament was also organized with thirty-five wrestlers from the Kyoto-based sumo association on the opening day of the Anglo-Japanese Alliance commemoration. The group leader, a local yokozuna named Ōikari Montarō, also performed a ring entering ceremony. The group then embarked on a three-and-a-half-year European tour.

A significant Western exhibit was the full sized gyroscopically balanced mono-rail developed by the Irish engineer Louis Brennan, which gave rides of around 40 passengers at a time around a 1-mile track, and which was awarded the Grand Prize as the best exhibit. During the exhibition Winston Churchill (then Home Secretary) rode upon the car, and drove it for one circuit, he was so impressed that he arranged for the Prime Minister, H. H. Asquith and David Lloyd George among others to travel on the mono-rail in early November.

== Reaction ==
=== Japanese ===
A number of the Japanese visitors felt that the display showing a “typical Japanese village” to be an embarrassment, depicting as it did the life of peasants in northeast Japan. Although not far from the truth, this was not the impression that Japan wished to convey to the Western public. These comments dominated in Japanese newspapers leading to the prevalent negative opinion that 'the exhibition was a failure'. Korehiro Kurahara, a member of the Japanese House of Representatives, spoke before the National Diet on January 25, 1911 disapproving of the exhibition. The Japanese were most concerned with how best Japan could convince the British public that it was worthy to be considered a modern and civilized ally and equal to any western nation.

Some Japanese correspondents in London also stated that certain exoticized and entertaining 'attractions', in the shape of sideshows organized by the entrepreneur who organized the exhibition were vulgar, and had been calculated to bring discredit to Japan. Moreover, the exhibition of the Ainu and Taiwanese natives together with their native dwellings was regarded as controversial and demeaning.

Consequently, in Japanese history, mention of the Japan–British Exhibition of 1910 is often neglected in favor of other events that year, such as Captain Nobu Shirase's Antarctic expedition.

=== British ===
The negative views of the exhibition in Japanese newspapers were in contrast to those of almost all British newspapers, which gave wide and detailed coverage and contained favorable reviews, especially on some of the exhibits of fine arts and the gardens.

== Aftermath ==
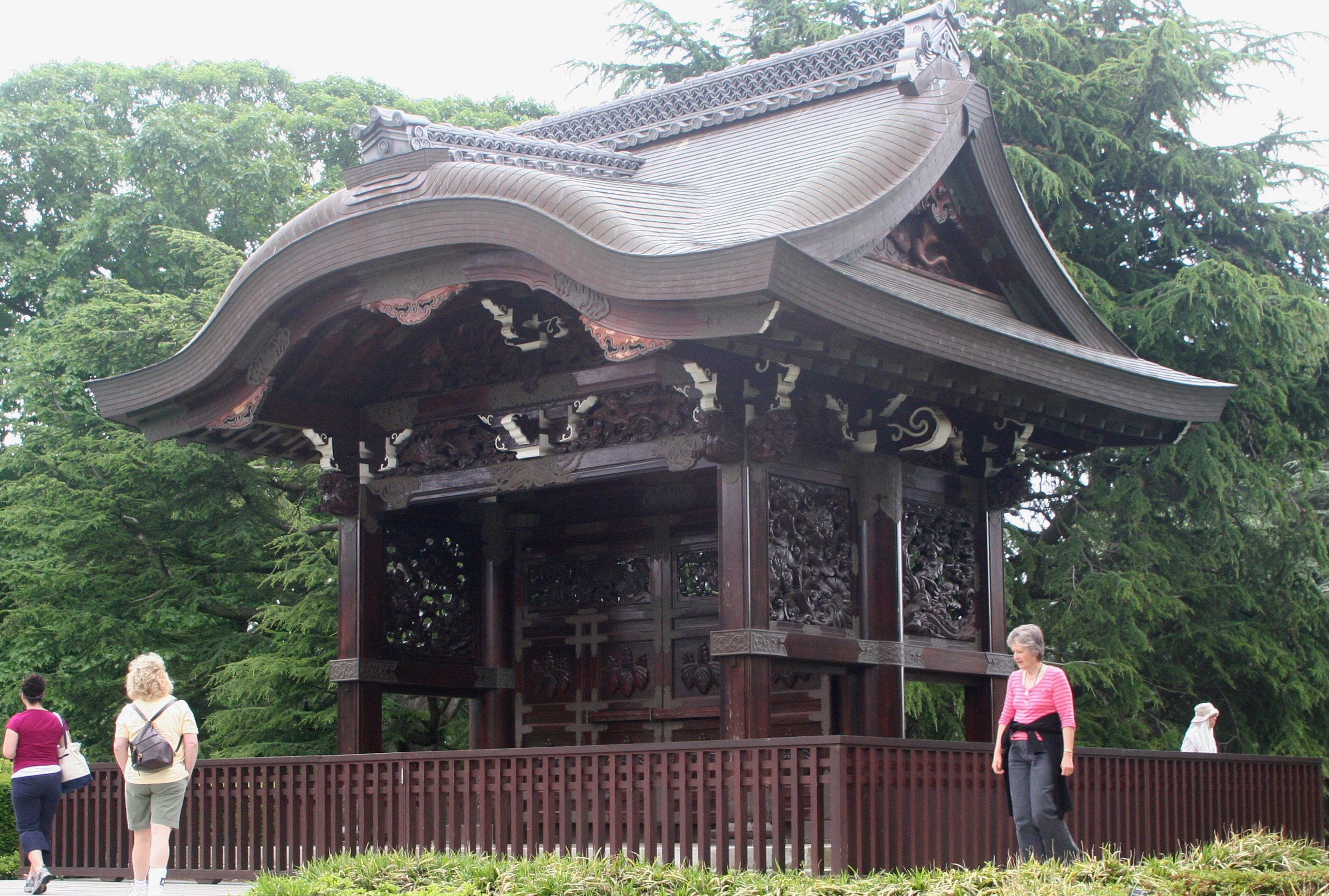
The Japanese Gateway (Chokushi-Mon)

The final stage of the exhibition was the disposal of the exhibits. These fell into three categories: those to be sent back to Japan (400 boxes in three separate shipments), those to be presented to various institutions (over 200 boxes divided between thirty recipients), and those to be sent to other cities in Europe where international exhibitions were projected for the near future (Dresden and Turin, both in 1911).

The Chokushimon (Gateway of the Imperial Messenger) (four-fifths replica of the Karamon of Nishi Hongan-ji in Kyoto) was moved to Kew Gardens a year later, where it still can be seen.

== See also ==
- Japan–United Kingdom relations
- Hakuhō period
- History of Shepherd's Bush
