= Namikawa Sōsuke =

Japanese cloisonné artist (1847–1910)

Namikawa Sōsuke (1847–1910) was a Japanese cloisonné artist, known for innovations that developed cloisonné enamel into an artistic medium sharing many features with paintings. He and Namikawa Yasuyuki (no relation) (Note: Despite their identical pronunciation, Namikawa Yasuyuki and Namikawa Sōsuke's family names are written differently in Chinese characters. (Earle 1999, p. 254)) were the most famous cloisonné artists of the 1890 to 1910 period, known as the "golden age" of Japanese enamels. Around 1880 he set up and ran the Tokyo branch of the Nagoya Cloisonné Company. He exhibited his artworks at national and international expositions, where he took an organising role. He was recognised as an Imperial Household Artist and created art works for imperial residences. He sometimes signed his works with the character sakigake (pioneer).

== Biography ==
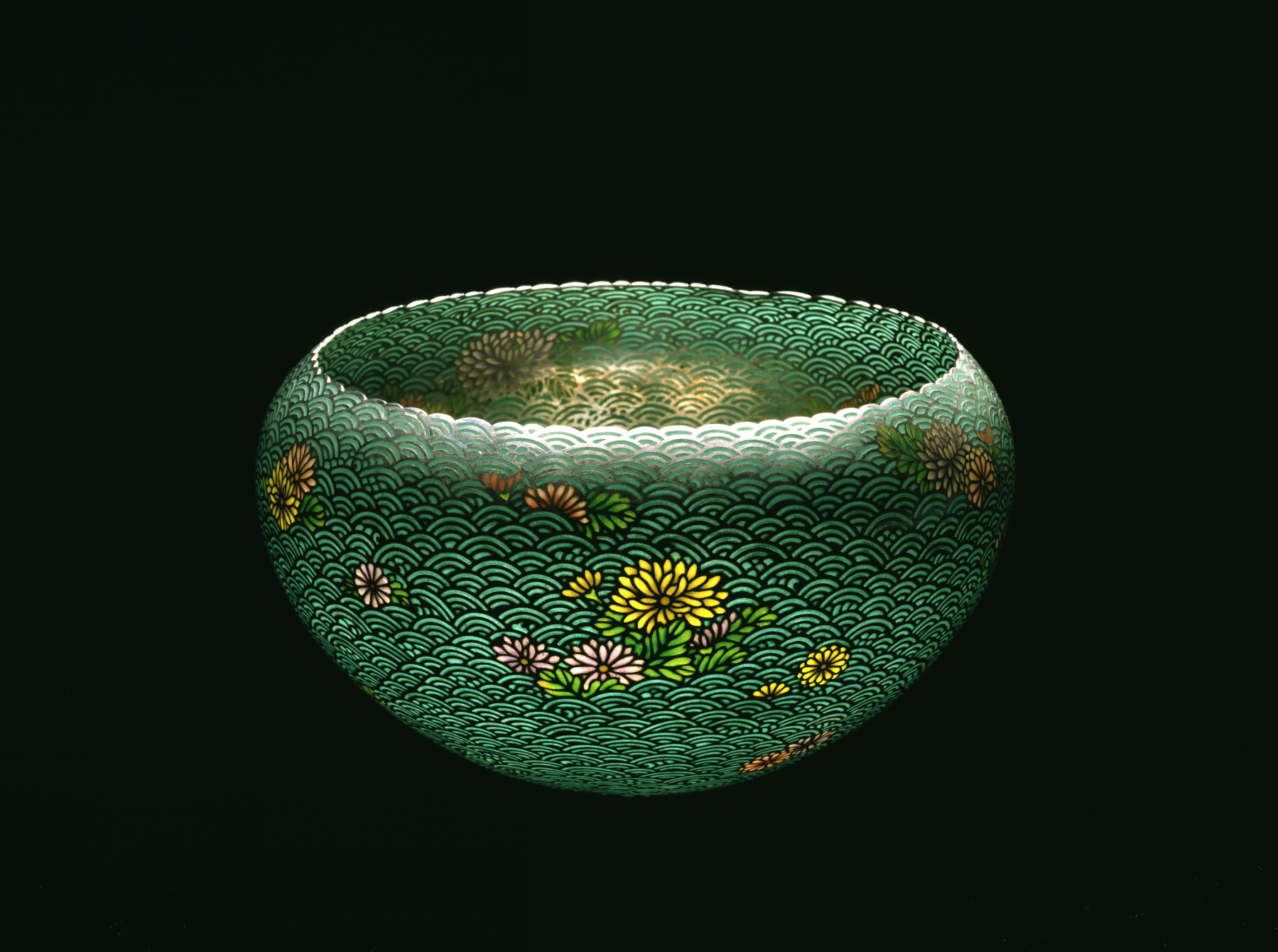
Bowl with Chrysanthemum Blossoms, circa 1900

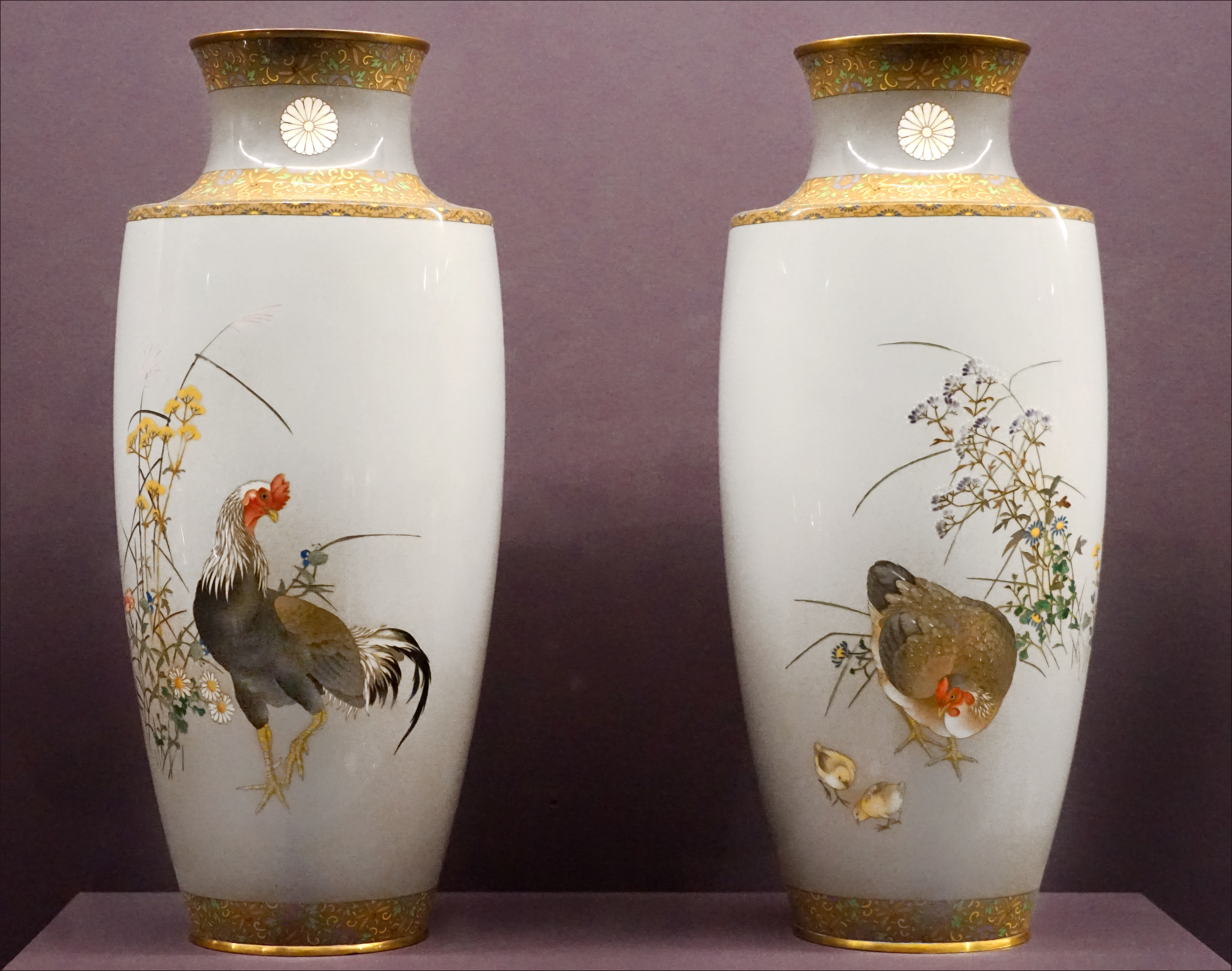
Pair of cloisonné vases with Imperial crests

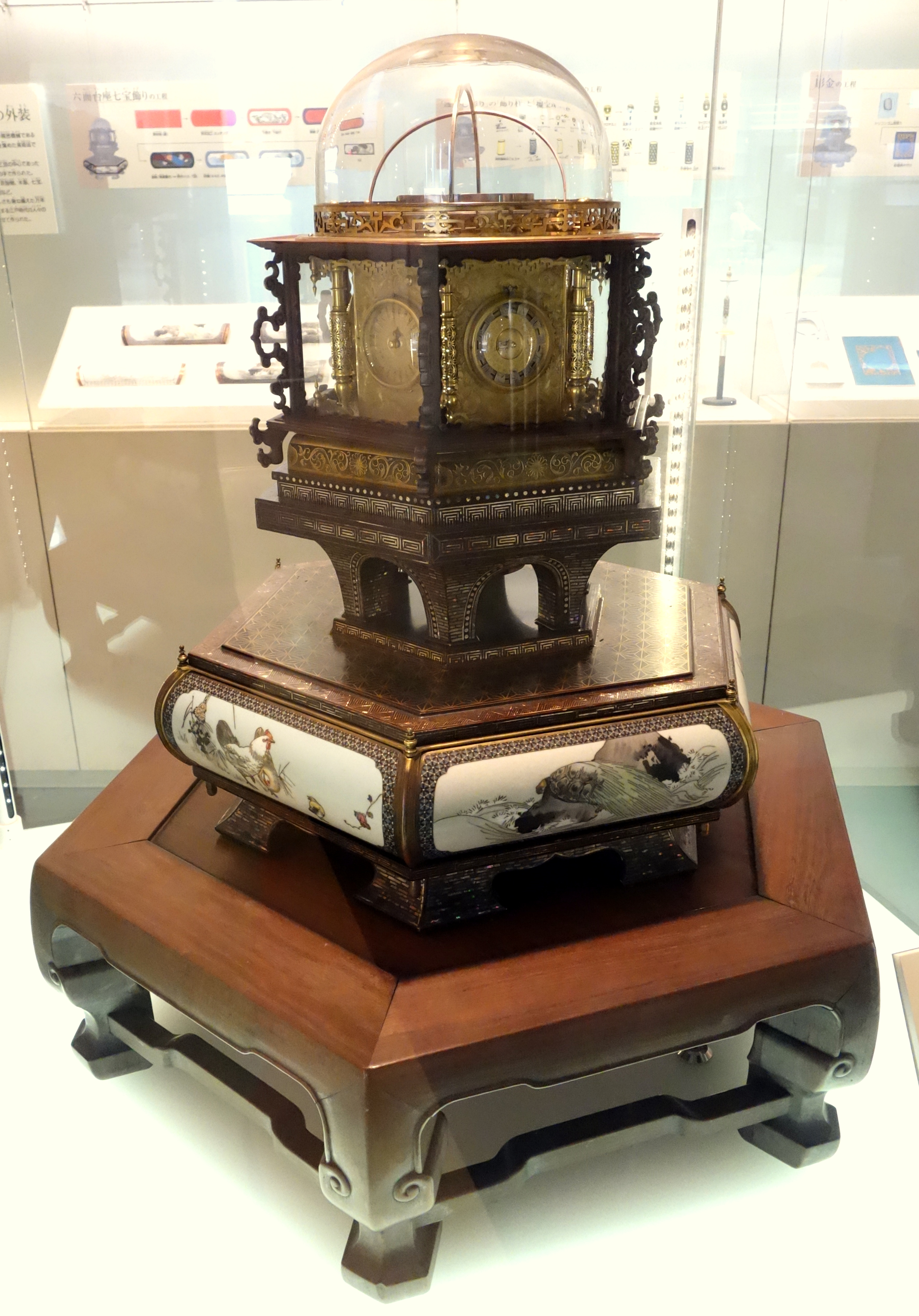
The "Myriad-Year Clock" with western and Japanese dials, weekly, monthly, and zodiac setting, with sun and moon, made by Hisashige Tanaka and enamel work by Namikawa, 1851

Japanese cloisonné traditionally involved opaque blocks of enamel enclosed in brass wire cloisons. In the late 19th century, artists replaced brass with silver and developed enamels that were translucent or transparent. Namikawa's workshop is regarded as the foremost developer of these techniques. With repeated firings, wires were not necessary to stop enamel areas bleeding into each other. He used two new techniques taking advantage of this: in shosen the wires are mostly burned out by sulphuric acid, leaving just fine details whereas in musen the wires are removed entirely before the final firing. These techniques were created with help from Gottfried Wagener, brought from Germany as a technical consultant to Japanese industry, but Namikawa later took credit for their creation. He also claimed to have invented in 1879 his process for creating colour gradients.

With these techniques, Namikawa's enamels could resemble paintings. He recreated nihonga paintings (of a classical Japanese style), particularly those of Watanabe Seitei. His subjects included hazy views of Mount Fuji and of clouds across the moon. A tray from around 1900 is likely modeled from a work by the Rinpa artist Ogata Kōrin. Over his career, Namikawa made increasing use of blank space, adopting a more distinctively Japanese style. The collector Donald Gerber distinguishes three schools of Japanese cloisonné and places Namikawa at the head of the Tokyo, or pictorial, school.

== Recognition ==
Namikawa exhibited at the 1881 National Industrial Exposition in Tokyo where his works were shown in the Art section while all other cloisonné works were displayed in the Industrial section. He won awards at the 1885 Amsterdam Colonial and Export Trade Exhibition, the 1885 Nuremberg International Metalwork Exhibition and the Paris Exposition Universelle of 1889. He also exhibited at the World's Columban Exposition of 1893 in Chicago. At the Louisiana Purchase Exposition of 1904 he won a Grand Prize. His work was also included in the Japan-British Exhibition held in London in 1910.

An article on Japanese enamels in The Decorator and Furnisher of February 1893 commented:

Among Japanese enamellers Namikawa, of Tokyo, is pre-eminent. Indeed, in his own field, he has no world left to conquer. [...] [H]e has done all the enamelling throughout the royal palaces and wins always the highest art prizes at the fine arts exhibitions around the world.

In 1896 he was appointed an Imperial Household Artist, one of only two cloisonné artists ever to receive this award, along with Namikawa Yasuyuki. These artists were given a yearly stipend and were commissioned by the Imperial family to make presentation wares as gifts for foreign dignitaries. These would often bear the Imperial family crest, a sixteen-petaled chrysanthemum. He seems to have been especially popular with the Imperial family, receiving many commissions. In 1906–07 he made a series of thirty enamel plaques for the Akasaka Palace. These oval medallions bear designs by Watanabe Seitei depicting flowers and birds of the four seasons. His Imperial commissions also included a pair of vases that were presented to the British admiral Sir Nowell Salmon.

Outside of Japan his works are in collections such as the Walters Art Museum and the Khalili Collection of Japanese Art of the Meiji Era.

== See also ==
- Ando Jubei

== Sources ==
- Earle, Joe (1999). Splendors of Meiji : treasures of imperial Japan : masterpieces from the Khalili Collection. St. Petersburg, Fla.: Broughton International Inc. ISBN 1874780137. OCLC 42476594.
