= Ando Jubei =

Japanese artist

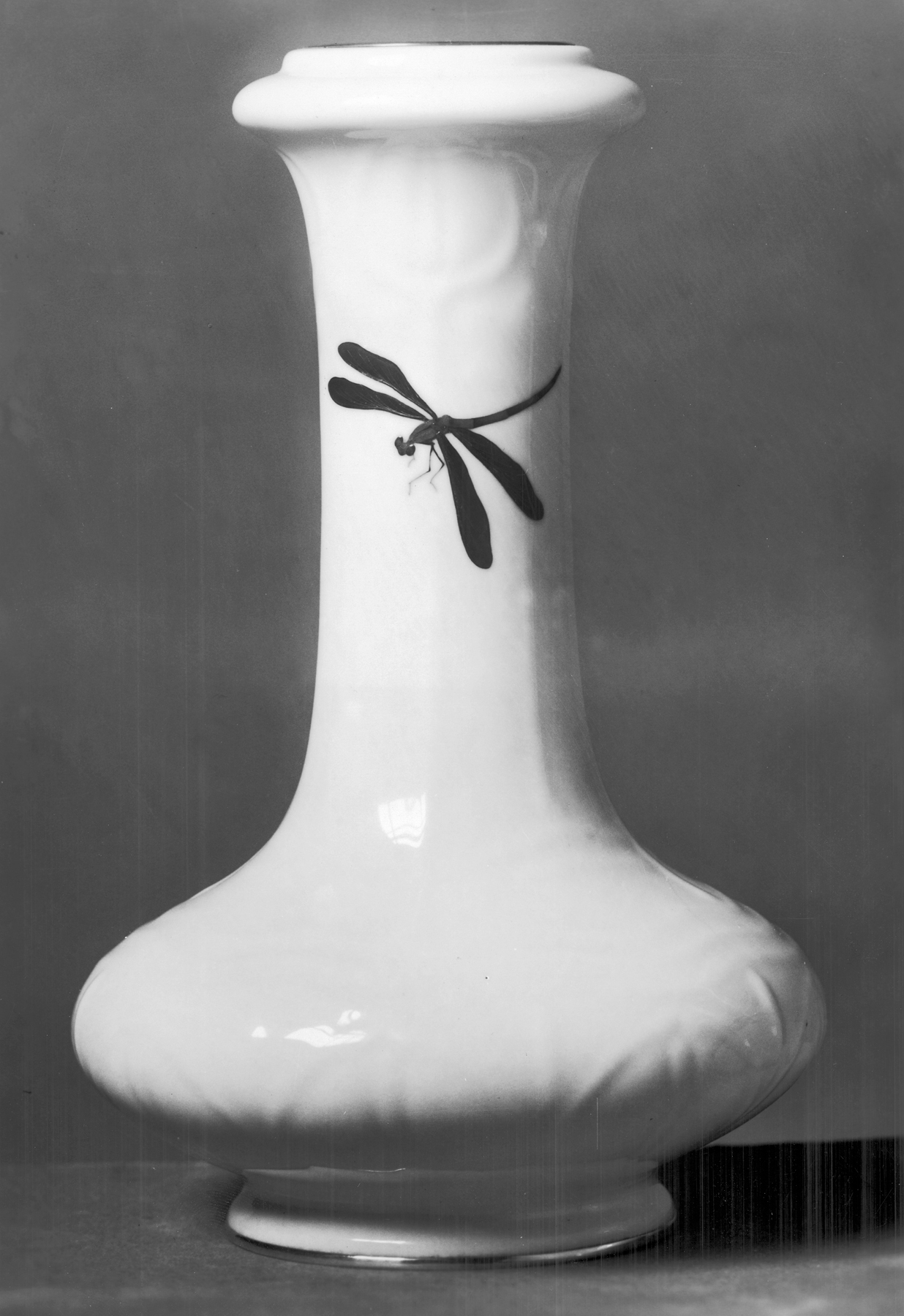
Decanter-Shaped Vase with Dragonfly, circa 1915, cloisonné enamel on silver, Walters Art Museum

Ando Jubei (1876–1956) was a Japanese cloisonné artist from Nagoya. Along with Hayashi Kodenji, he dominated Nagoya's enameling industry in the late Meiji era. Ando, Namikawa Yasuyuki, and Namikawa Sōsuke are considered the three artists whose technical innovations brought in the "Golden Age for Japanese cloisonné" in the late 19th century.

Ando was the Meiji era's most prolific creator of presentation wares: artworks that were commissioned by members of the Imperial Family for presentation to foreign dignitaries. He exhibited at the Japan–British Exhibition of 1910.

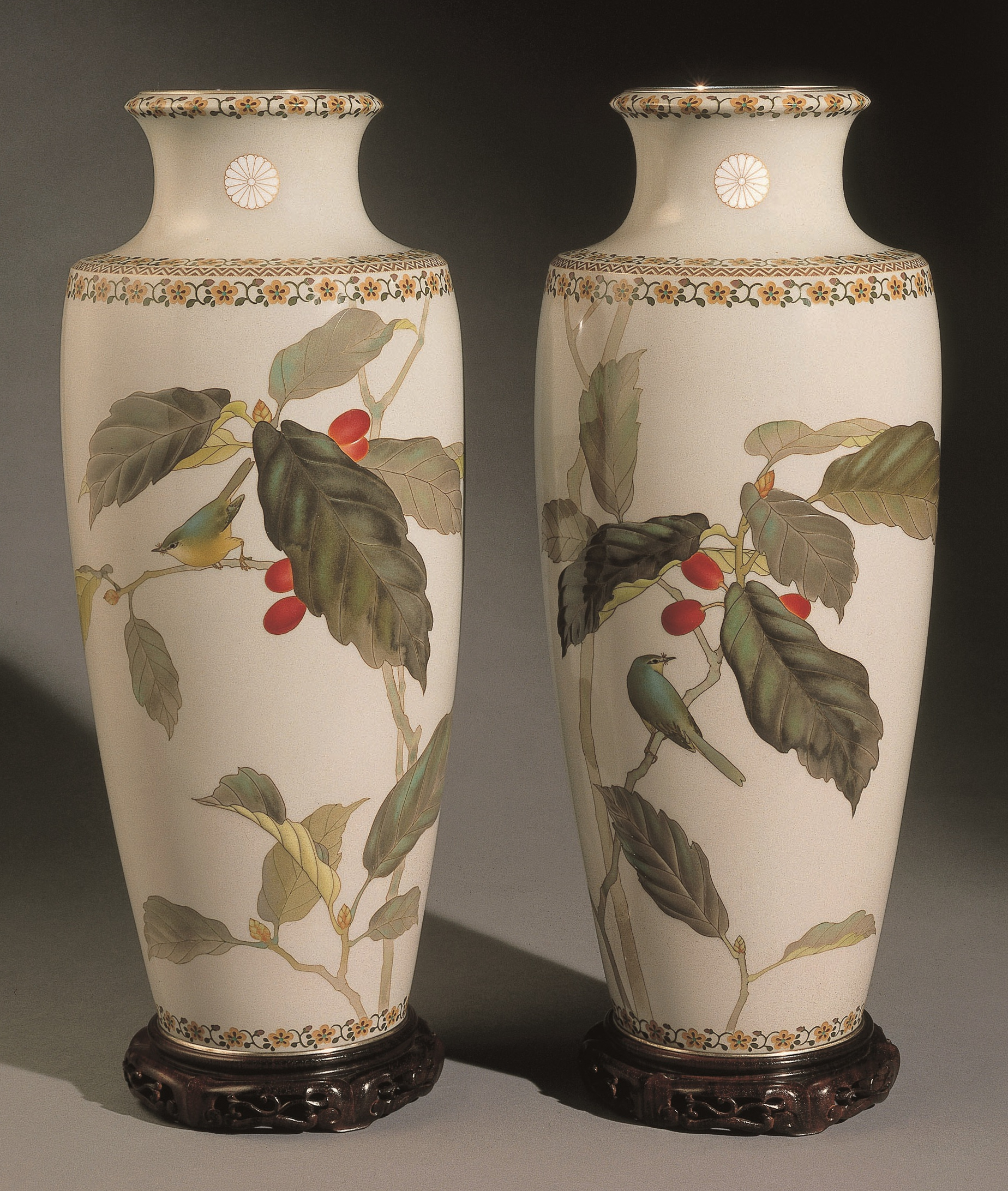
Pair of presentation vases with the Imperial Household symbol, Khalili Collection of Japanese Art

His work is held in the collections of the Walters Art Museum, the Ashmolean Museum and in the Khalili Collection of Japanese Art.

The Ando Cloisonné Company continues his work.

== See also ==
- Hattori Tadasaburō
