= Imperial Household Artist =

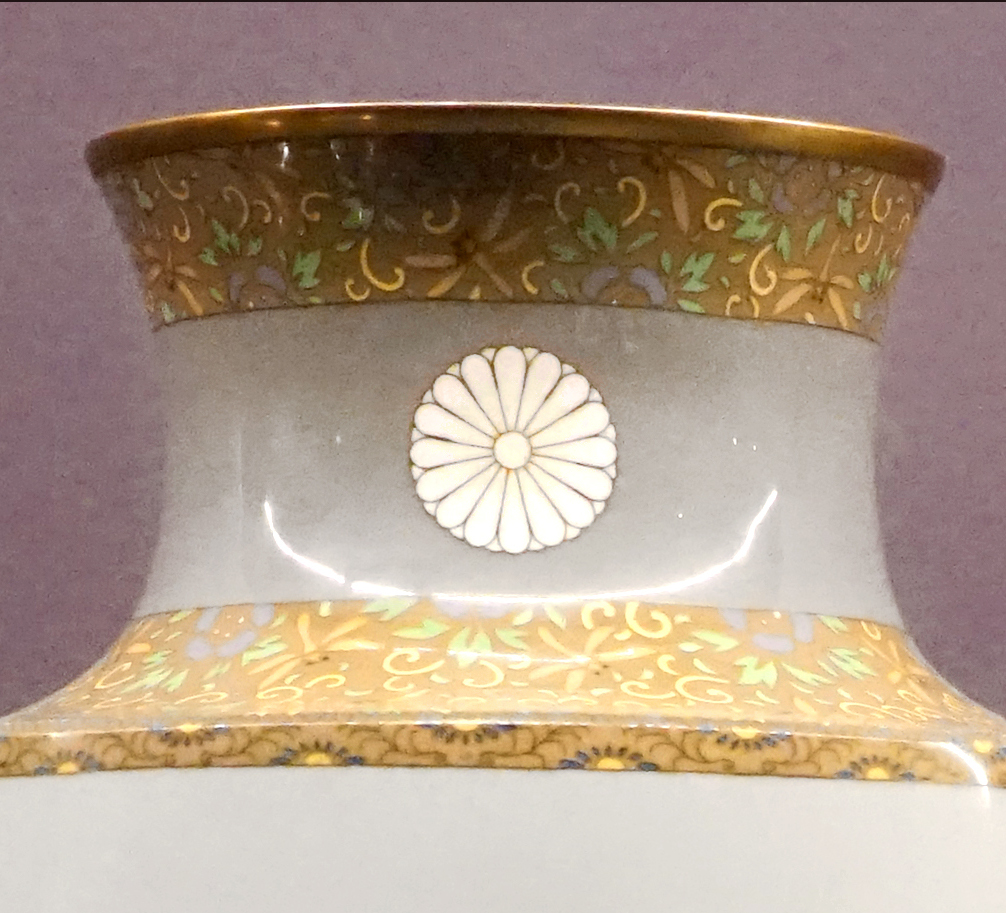
The Japanese Imperial crest on a cloisonné presentation vase by Namikawa Sōsuke

An Imperial Household Artist (帝室技芸員, Teishitsu Gigei-in) was an artist who was officially appointed by the Imperial Household Agency of Japan to create works of art for the Tokyo Imperial Palace and other imperial residences.

== History ==
The system came into being during the Meiji period in 1890 and was discontinued after the end of World War II. From 1890 to 1944, seventy-nine individuals were appointed to the position, from both the fine and decorative arts. These tended to be artists who had already had a long and distinguished career. The programme was created to promote Japanese art, inspire new generations of artists, and preserve old techniques.

Imperial Household Artists received 100 yen each year. They were expected to submit one example of their work on being appointed and to accept commissions from the Imperial Household Agency. Some of the works commissioned were for presentation to foreign dignitaries. Many presentation wares were commissioned and then put into storage, to be gifted when the need came. Often these wares would bear the Imperial crest, a sixteen-petalled chrysanthemum.

In 1912, all twenty-four of the current artists were commissioned to create gifts for the Meiji Emperor to celebrate his 61st birthday. The Emperor died before the presentation could take place, so the items were placed in the Imperial Household Museum, which later became the Tokyo National Museum.

Most pieces of work cannot be seen in public except for some in the Museum of the Imperial Collections, as well as pieces in the Kiyomizu Sannenzaka Museum (ja), the Tokyo National Museum and the Khalili Collection of Japanese Art.

Important artists are still designated and protected by the government under the system of Living National Treasures.

== List of artists ==
Full name	Specialty	Appointment date	Death date
Tazaki Sōun	painting	2 October 1890	1 September 1898
Mori Kansai	painting	2 October 1890	2 June 1894
Shibata Zeshin	lacquerware	2 October 1890	13 July 1891
Kanō Eitoku	painting	2 October 1890	29 January 1891
Morizumi Tsurana	painting	2 October 1890	26 February 1892
Date Yasuke	textile art	2 October 1890	20 March 1892
Kano Natsuo	engraving	2 October 1890	3 February 1898
Hashimoto Gahō	painting	2 October 1890	13 January 1908
Takamura Kōun	sculpture	2 October 1890	10 October 1934
Ishikawa Komei	sculpture	2 October 1890	30 July 1913
Noguchi Yukoku	painting	25 September 1893	26 June 1898
Taki Katei	painting	25 September 1893	28 September 1901
Kōno Bairei	painting	25 September 1893	2 February 1895
Seifu Yohei III	ceramics	25 September 1893	15 July 1914
Kishi Chikudō	painting	30 June 1896	27 July 1900
Yamana Nukiyoshi	painting	30 June 1896	11 June 1902
Kawabata Gyokushō	painting	30 June 1896	14 February 1913
Ito Heizaemon	architecture	30 June 1896	11 May 1913
Unno Shomin	gold carving	30 June 1896	8 October 1915
Miyagawa Kozan	ceramics	30 June 1896	24 May 1916
Namikawa Sōsuke	cloisonné	30 June 1896	14 February 1910
Namikawa Yasuyuki	cloisonné	30 June 1896	14 February 1927
Suzuki Chokichi	metalwork	30 June 1896	29 January 1919
Kawanobe Itcho	maki-e	30 June 1896	5 September 1910
Tadashi Ikeda	maki-e	30 June 1896	7 March 1903
Kawashima Jinbei	textile art	9 February 1898	5 May 1910
Araki Kanpo	painting	21 July 1900	21 July 1915
Naohiko Kumagai	painting	16 April 1904	8 March 1913
Mochizuki Gyokusen	painting	16 April 1904	16 September 1913
Imao Keinen	painting	16 April 1904	5 October 1924
Noguchi Shōhin	painting	16 April 1904	17 February 1917
Takeuchi Kyūichi	sculpture	4 April 1906	24 September 1916
Shirayama Shosai	lacquerware	4 April 1906	7 August 1923
Kagawa Katsuhiro	gold carving	4 April 1906	15 January 1917
Miyamoto Kanenori	bladesmithing	4 April 1906	22 October 1926
Nakai Keisho	carving	4 April 1906	30 September 1909
Gassan Sadakazu	bladesmithing	4 April 1906	11 July 1918
Kishi Kokei	design	4 April 1906	3 May 1922
Kuroda Seiki	yōga (Western-style painting)	18 October 1910	16 July 1924
Ogawa Kazumasa	photography	18 October 1910	7 September 1929
Takeuchi Seihō	painting	18 December 1913	23 August 1942
Tsukada Shukyo	engraving	18 December 1913	29 December 1918
Kōgyō Terasaki	painting	17 June 1917	11 February 1919
Tomoto Kobori	painting	17 June 1917	1 October 1931
Kawai Gyokudō	painting	17 June 1917	30 June 1958
Kanzan Shimomura	painting	17 June 1917	10 May 1930
Tomioka Tessai	painting	17 June 1917	3 December 1923
Yamamoto Shunkyo	painting	17 June 1917	11 July 1933
Taketarō Shinkai	sculpture	17 June 1917	12 March 1927
Ito Suzan	ceramics	17 June 1917	24 September 1920
Suwa Sozan	ceramics	17 June 1917	9 February 1922
Muneyuki Hirata	metalwork	17 June 1917	25 February 1920
Sasaki Iwajiro	architecture	17 June 1917	10 October 1936
Yokoyama Taikan	nihonga (Japanese-style painting)	30 June 1931	26 January 1958
Akatsuka Jitoku	lacquerware	1930	1936
Hashimoto Kansetsu	nihonga	3 December 1934	26 February 1945
Yasuda Yukihiko	nihonga	3 December 1934	29 April 1978
Keigetsu Kikuchi	nihonga	3 December 1934	9 September 1955
Eisaku Wada	yōga	3 December 1934	3 January 1959
Fujishima Takeji	yōga	3 December 1934	19 March 1943
Okada Saburōsuke	yōga	3 December 1934	23 September 1939
Choun Yamazaki	sculpture	3 December 1934	4 June 1954
Hazan Itaya	crafts	3 December 1934	10 October 1963
Hozuma Katori	crafts	3 December 1934	31 January 1954
Nanzan Shimizu	crafts	3 December 1934	7 December 1948
Nishiyama Suisho	nihonga	1 July 1944	30 March 1958
Inshō Dōmoto	nihonga	1 July 1944	5 September 1975
Kiyokata Kaburagi	nihonga	1 July 1944	2 March 1972
Uemura Shōen	nihonga	1 July 1944	27 August 1949
Seison Maeda	nihonga	1 July 1944	27 October 1977
Matsubayashi Keigetsu	nihonga	1 July 1944	22 May 1963
Kokei Kobayashi	nihonga	1 July 1944	3 April 1957
Komuro Suiun	nihonga	1 July 1944	30 March 1945
Kanayama Heizō	yōga	1 July 1944	15 July 1964
Hiromitsu Nakazawa	yōga	1 July 1944	8 September 1964
Ryūzaburō Umehara	yōga	1 July 1944	16 January 1986
Sōtarō Yasui	yōga	1 July 1944	14 December 1955
Minami Kunzō	yōga	1 July 1944	6 January 1950
Fumio Asakura	sculpture	1 July 1944	18 April 1964
Hirakushi Denchū	sculpture	1 July 1944	30 December 1979

== Sources ==
- Earle, Joe (1999). Splendors of Meiji : treasures of imperial Japan : masterpieces from the Khalili Collection. St. Petersburg, Fla.: Broughton International Inc. ISBN 1874780137. OCLC 42476594.
