= Namikawa Yasuyuki =

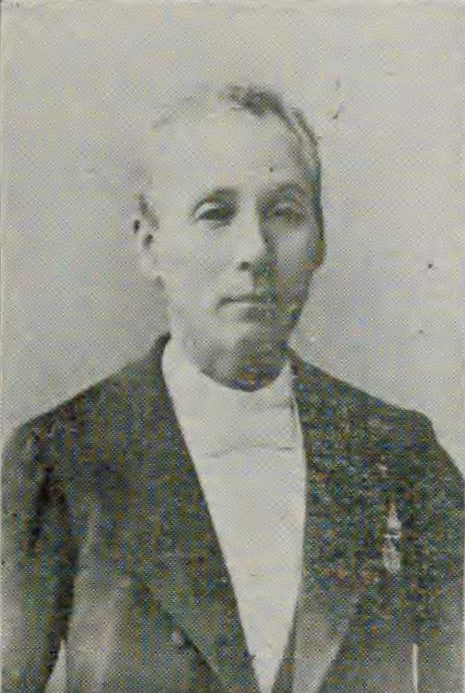
Namikawa Yasuyuki

Namikawa Yasuyuki (1845–1927) — original family name Takaoka — was a Japanese cloisonné artist. His work was highly sought after in his own lifetime and is held in several collections today. He and Namikawa Sōsuke (no relation) (Note: Despite their identical pronunciation, Namikawa Yasuyuki and Namikawa Sōsuke's family names are written differently in Chinese characters.(Earle 1999, p. 254)) were the most famous cloisonné artists of the 1890 to 1910 period, known as the "Golden age" of Japanese enamels. From 1875 to 1915, he won prizes at 51 exhibitions, including at world's fairs and at Japan's National Industrial Exhibition. For his work he was appointed an Imperial Household Artist in 1896. He sometimes signed his pieces Kyoto Namikawa (Namikawa of Kyoto).

== Biography ==
A former samurai, Namikawa Yasuyuki started work as an artist around 1868, working for the Kyoto Cloisonné Company from 1871 to 1874 and eventually forming his own company. He gave tours of his workshop; one visitor was the English writer Rudyard Kipling. These tours began in a garden to introduce Japanese aesthetics, and Namikawa would show the many stages of his production process, including fourteen polishing stones of different roughness that were used in sequence.

Along with Namikawa Sōsuke, he was one of only two cloisonné artists ever to be appointed Imperial Household Artist. These artists were given a yearly stipend and were commissioned by the Imperial family to make presentation wares as gifts for foreign dignitaries. After the Meiji era, foreign demand for Japanese art tailed off. Namikawa Yasuyuki retired in 1919 and his workshop closed in 1923.

== Style ==
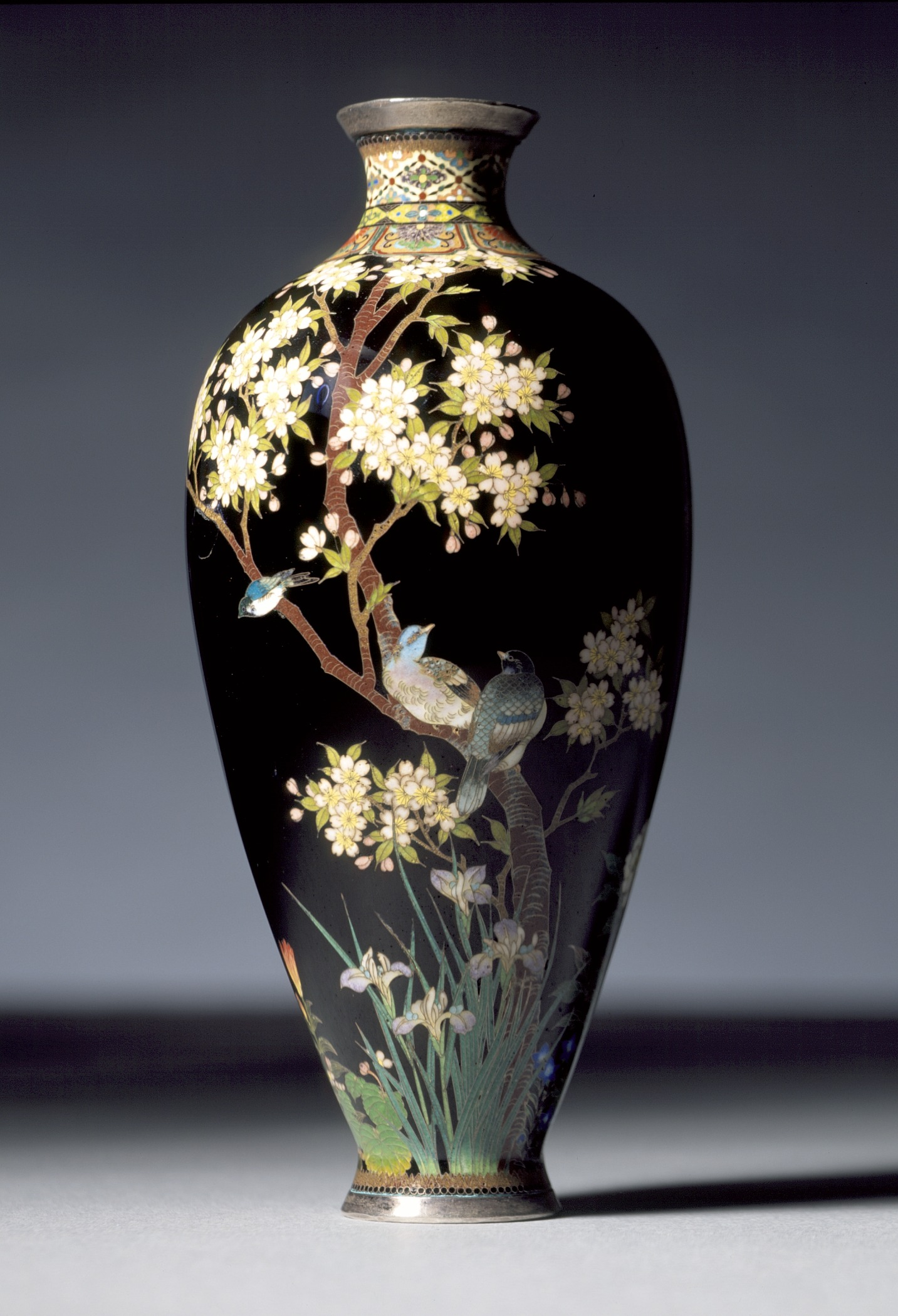
Vase with Flowers and Birds (花鳥文花瓶)

The collector Donald Gerber distinguishes three schools of Japanese cloisonné and places Namikawa at the head of the Kyoto, or naturalistic, school.

He invented the first transparent black glaze, which led to the development of other transparent enamels. He used intricate wire work and is known for attention to detail. His early work used geometrical motifs or stylised representations of plants. His style became more pictorial over his career, usually depicting Kyoto's landmarks. He also worked with larger and more varied vases. Colourful figures on a yellow ground are one of his identifying marks. His style was shaped by his contact with Gottfried Wagener, a German scientist brought to Japan by the government to help modernise Japanese industry. Together they developed a semi-transparent mirror black enamel that became a hallmark of Namikawa's work. By 1893 Namikawa had learned to hide background wires, creating solid areas of enamel.

He experimented extensively with the proportions and combinations of minerals, as well as with firing times and temperatures, to develop a wide range of colors and delicate gradations. In the Namikawa family’s collection, many of the original enamels used during that time are still preserved. For example, records indicate that to create the color known as "Special Yellow Gradation for the Paulownia Vase" (桐花瓶用別口黄色ボカシ), he used as many as fifteen different enamels with varying degrees of brightness, revealing his remarkable dedication to color.

Judges at Japan's fourth National Industrial Exhibition in 1895 remarked on Namikawa's change of stylistic approach when awarding him first prize:

"[H]ere flowers of the four seasons, with birds of exquisite coloring, are set on to a black background color, forming a picture far beyond a mere pattern. But he seems still to adhere to the traditional methods of depiction, not attempting to imitate brushwork as do some other persons. He places great emphasis on fine wirework and on a flawless surface with no pitting or bubbles, achieved through painstaking study of glazing and firing."

At the National Industrial Exhibition of 1881, Namikawa was awarded second prize for a copper vase "of elegant shape with opaque and transparent colors and complicated wire-work, with no trace of cracks." He exhibited at the Louisiana Purchase Exhibition of 1904, winning a gold prize.

== Collections ==
Many of his works are in collections today such as the Ashmolean Museum, the Victoria and Albert Museum, the Los Angeles County Museum of Art and Khalili Collection of Japanese Art. The Namikawa Cloisonne Museum of Kyoto (ja) and Kiyomizu Sannenzaka Museum (ja) in Higashiyama-ku, Kyoto, exhibits a range of his items.

The most highly acclaimed and famous of his works is the 1899 Vase with Birds and Flowers of the Four Seasons (四季花鳥図花瓶), which is owned by the Museum of the Imperial Collections. It was exhibited at the Exposition Universelle held in Paris in 1900 and received a gold prize. In 2025, it was designated as an Important Cultural Property.

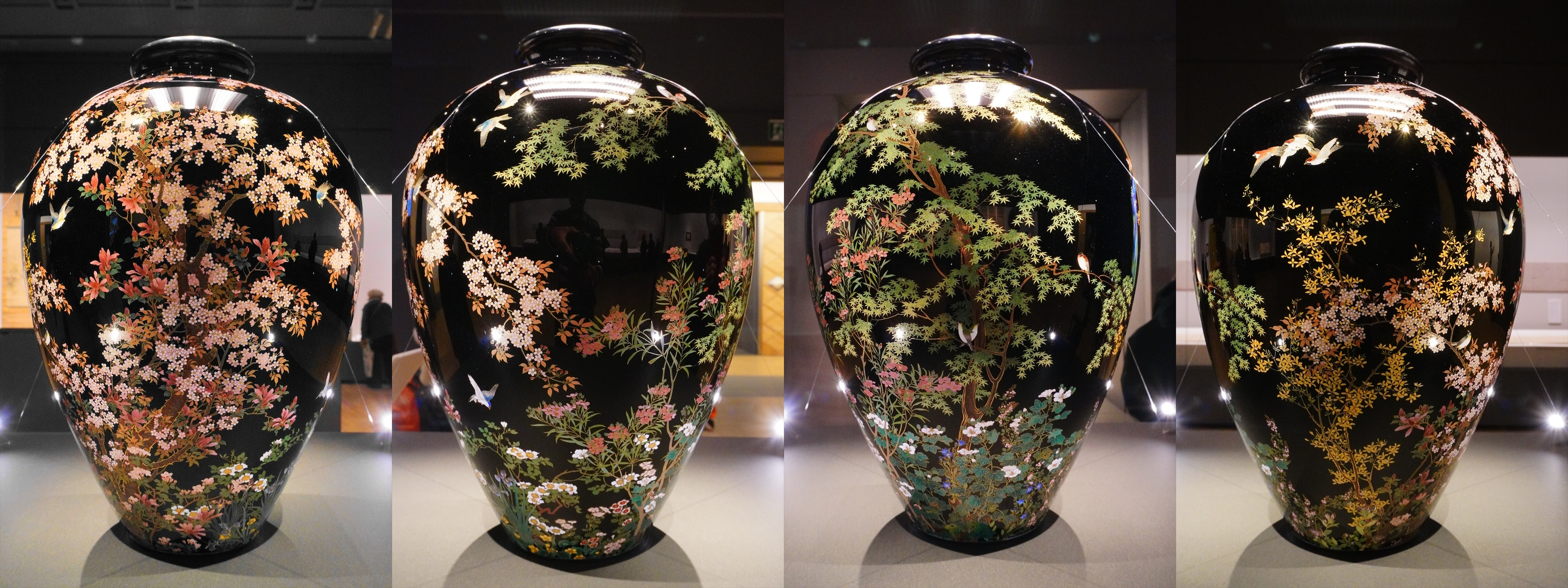
Vase with Birds and Flowers of the Four Seasons, 1899, Important Cultural Property

== Gallery ==
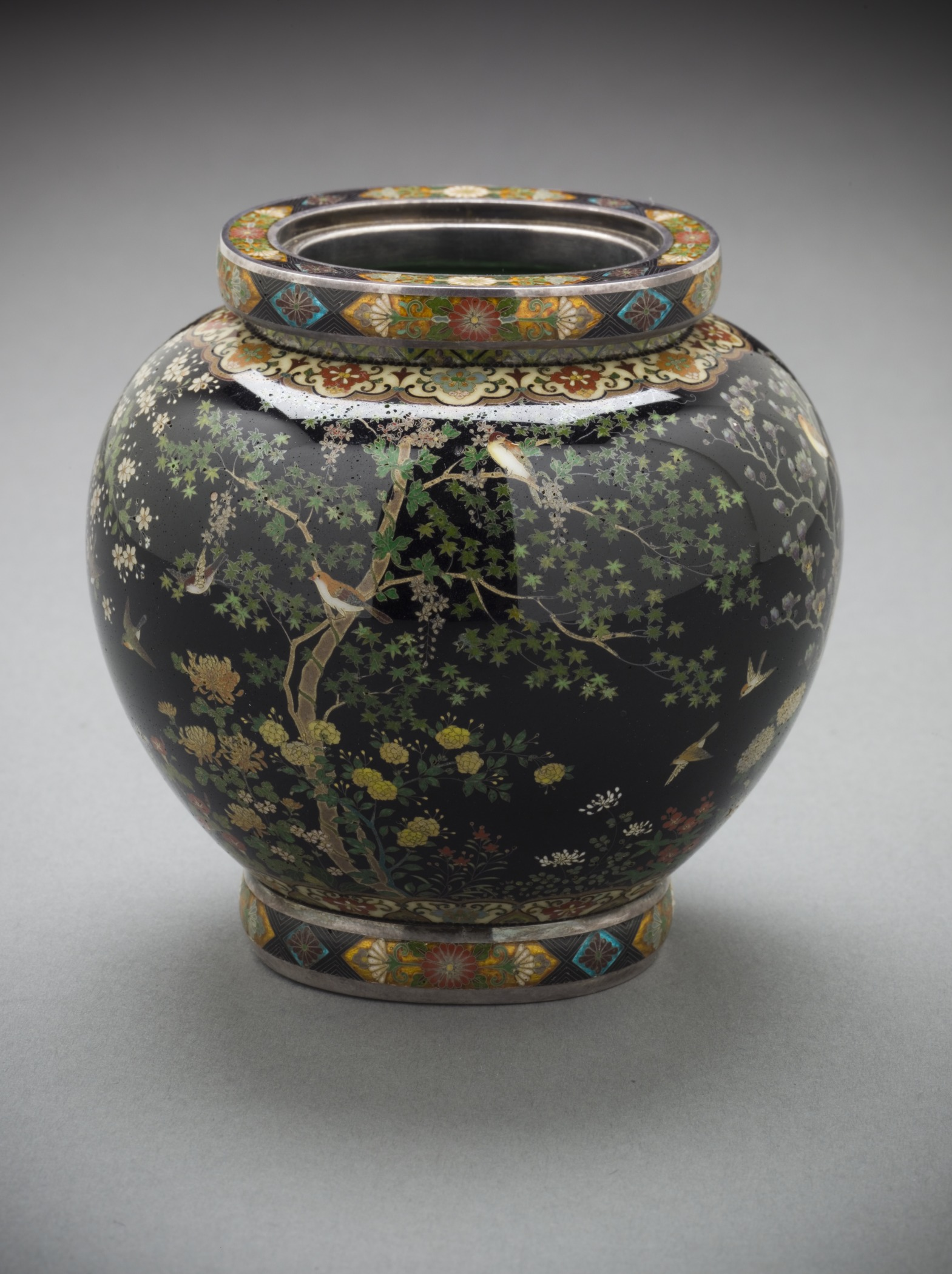
Koro, 19th century

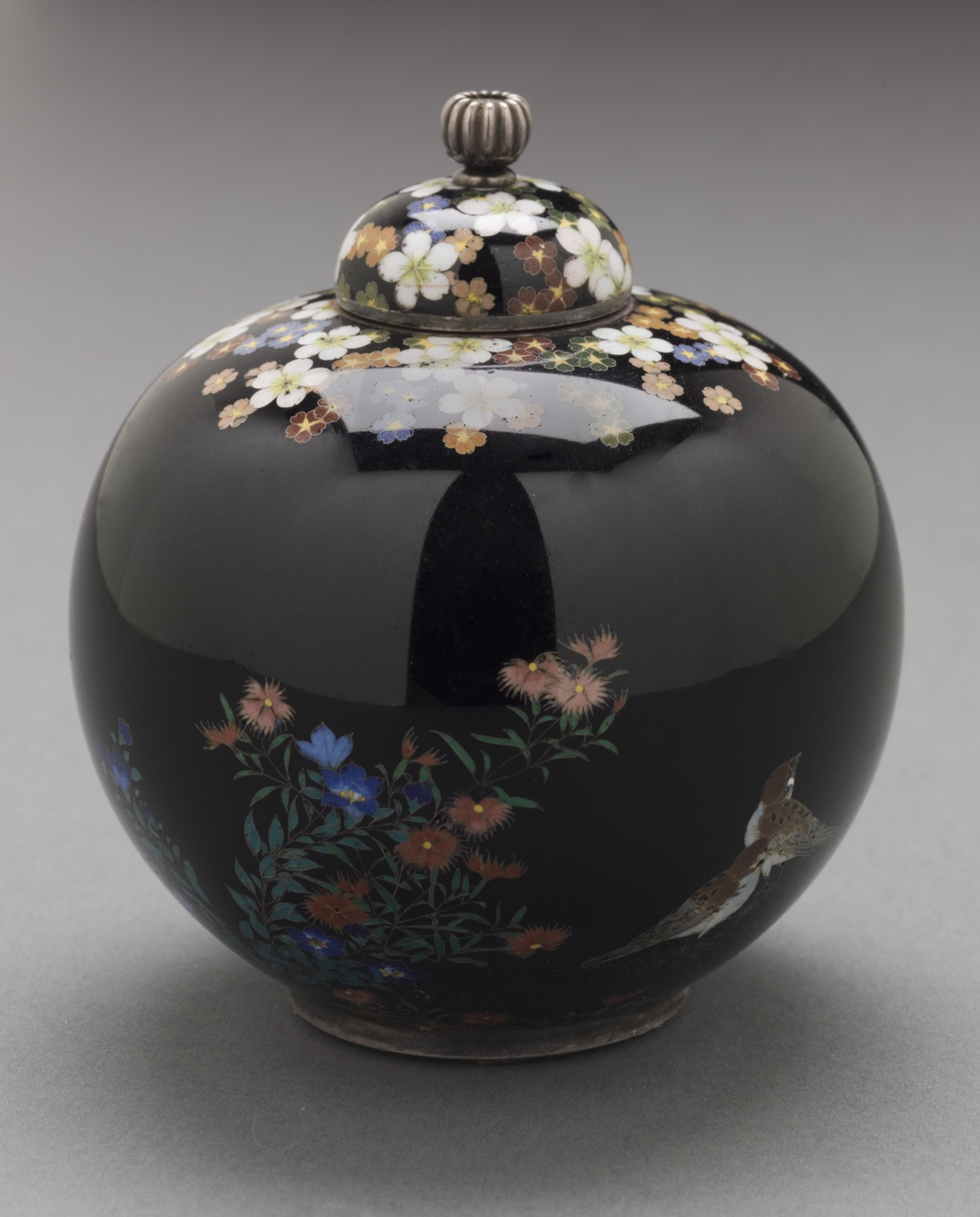
Jar with cover

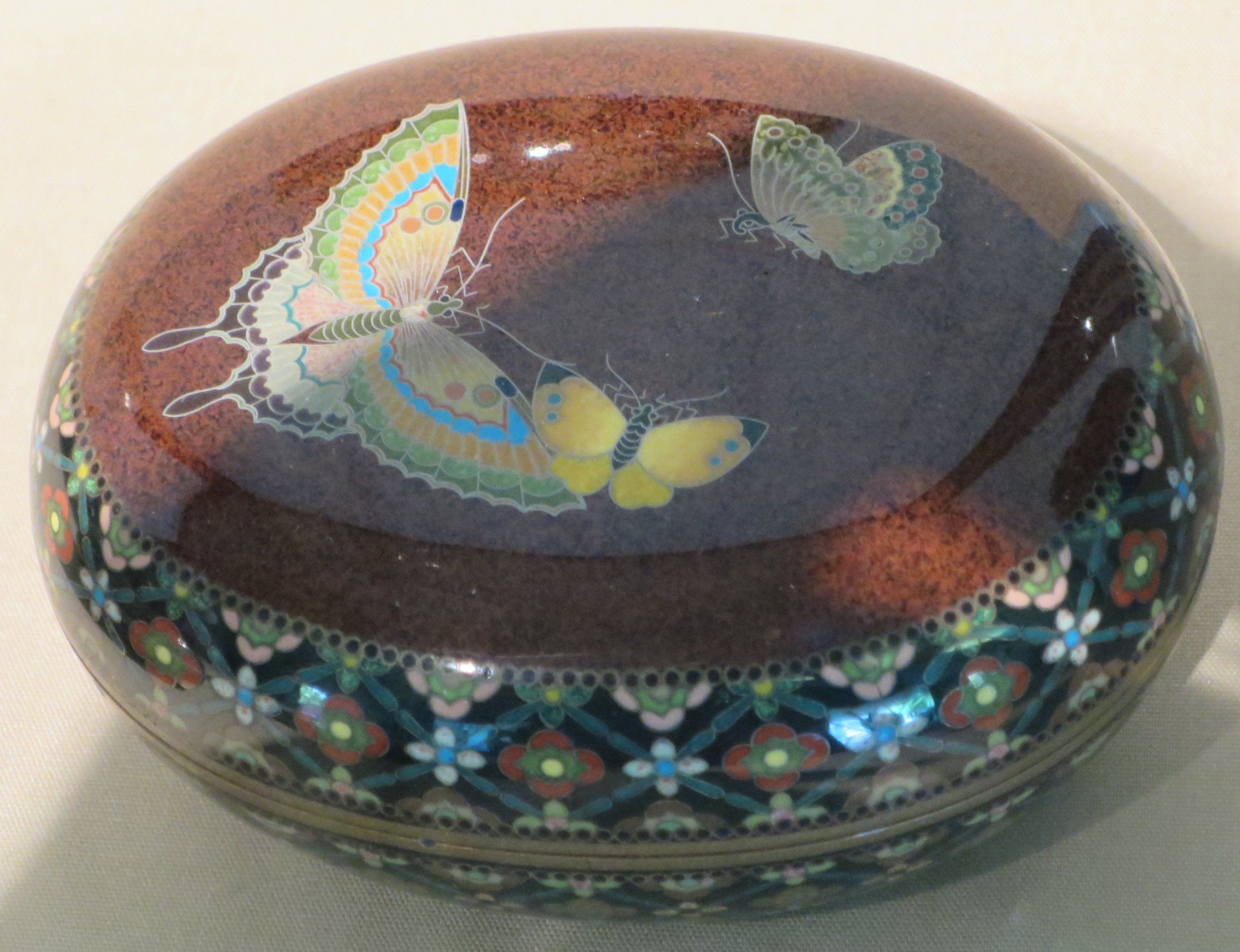
Box with butterfly design, 1890

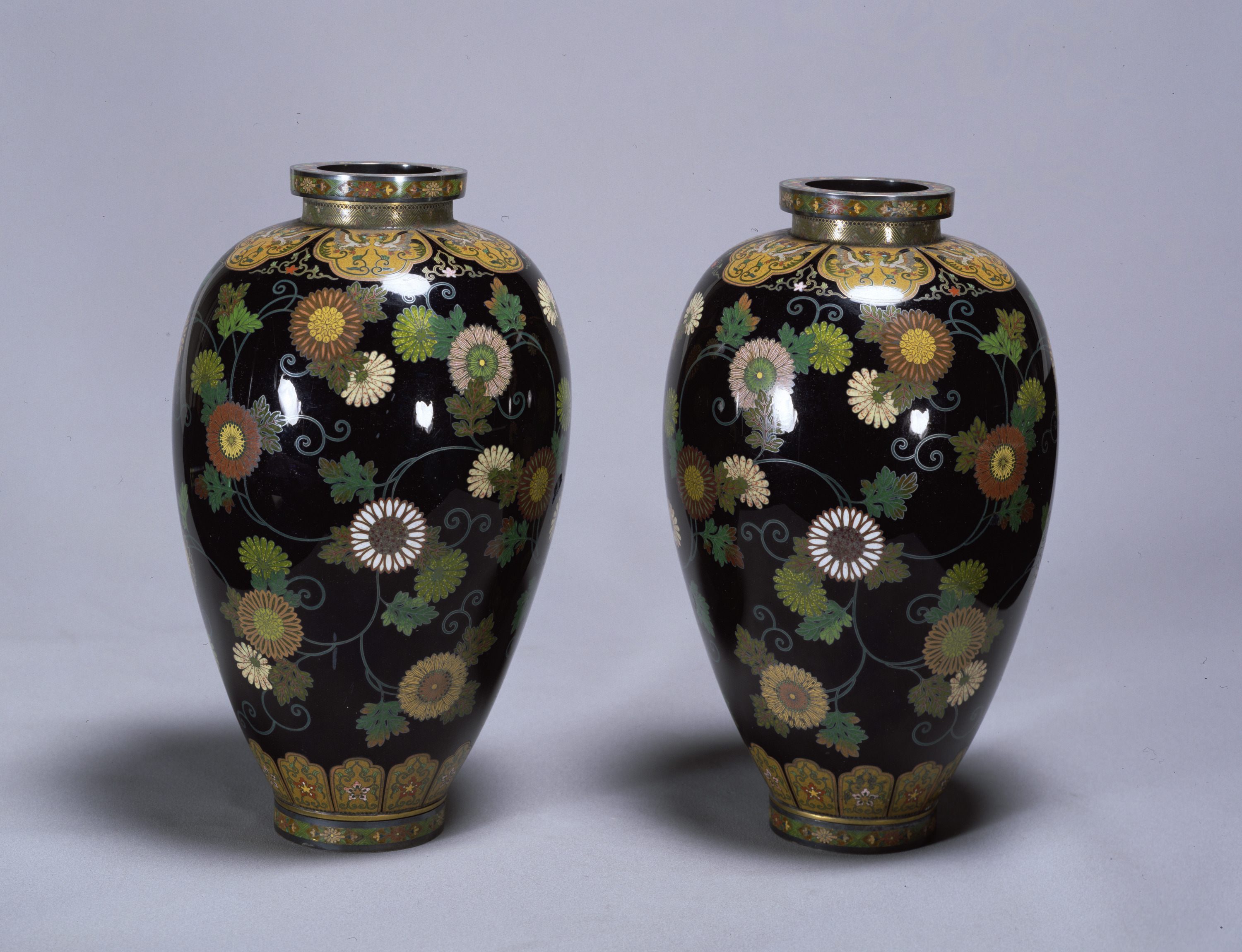
Chrysanthemum and ivy bottle, 1892

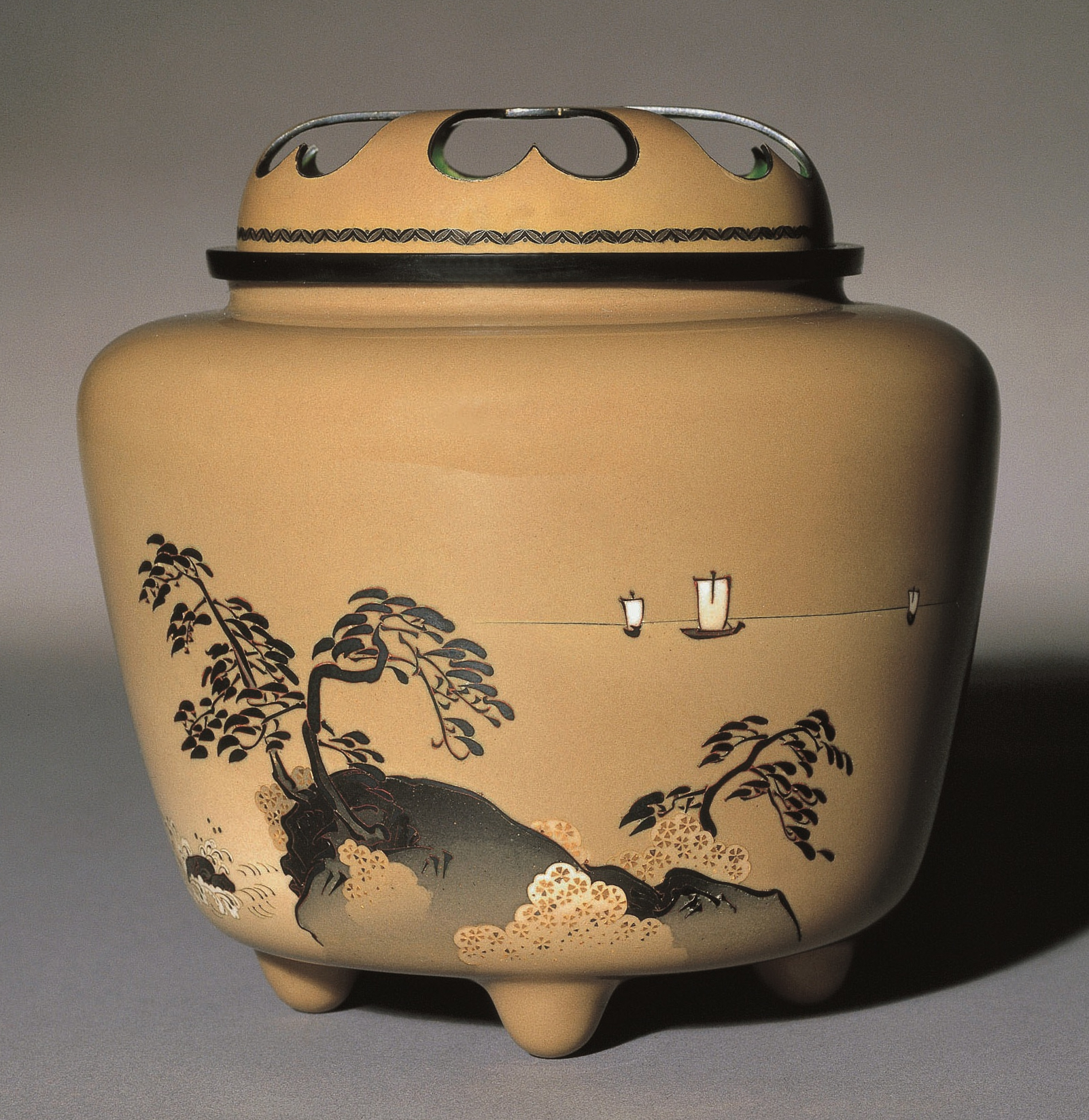
Koro and cover, circa 1910

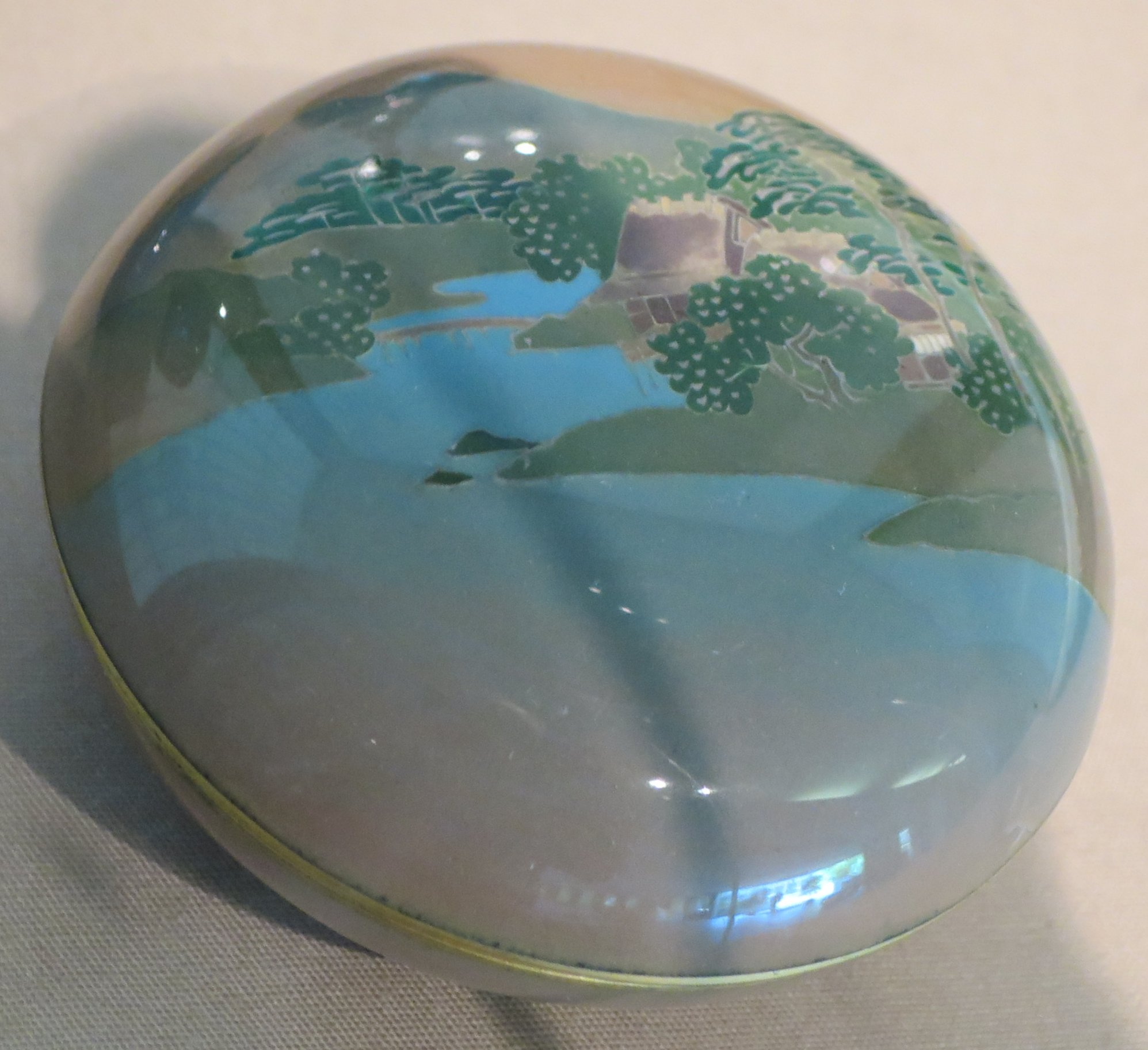
Incense container with landscape design, 1910

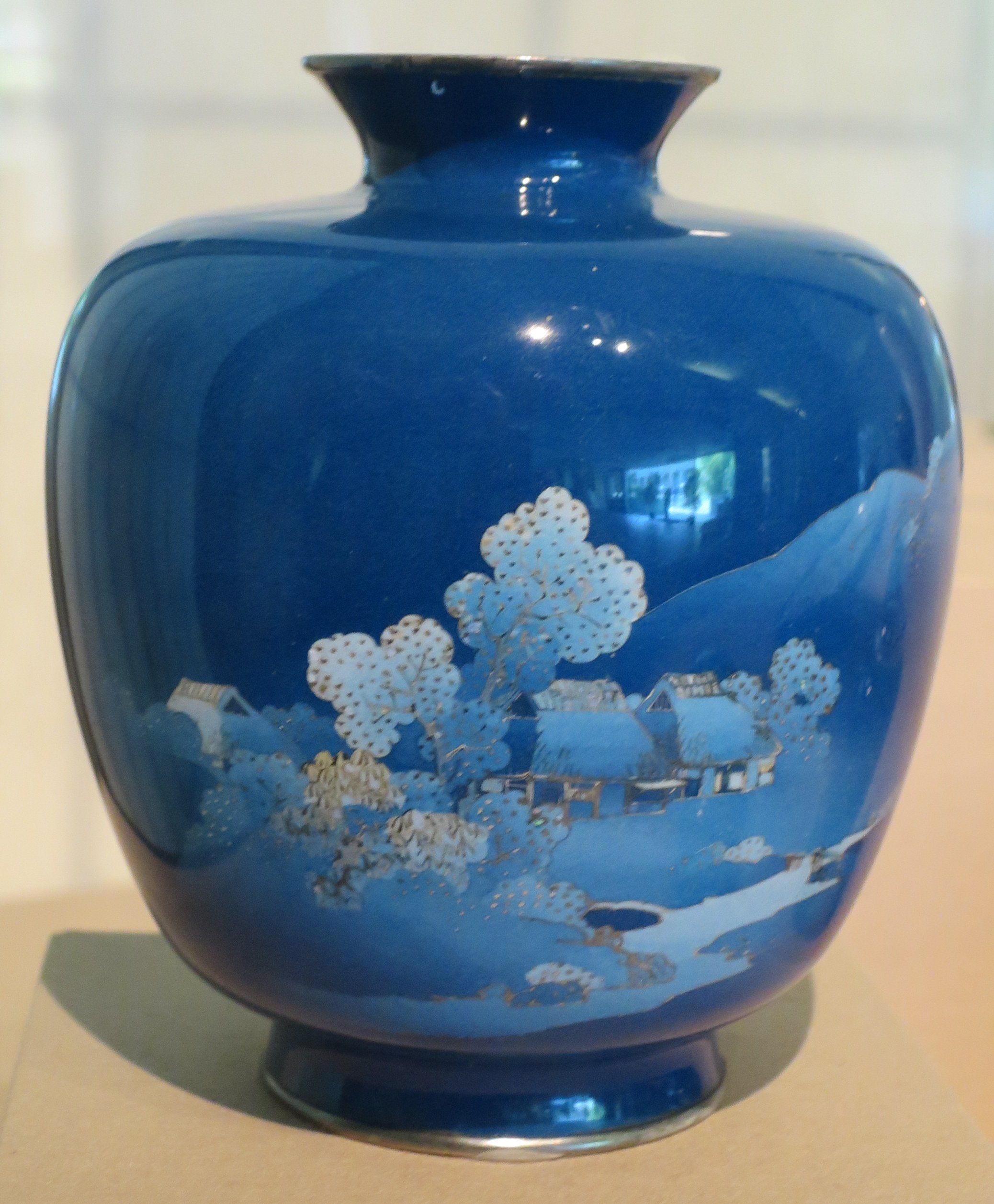
Vase with houses in a landscape, 1910-1915

== See also ==
- Ando Jubei

== Sources ==
- Earle, Joe (1999). Splendors of Meiji : treasures of imperial Japan : masterpieces from the Khalili Collection. St. Petersburg, Fla.: Broughton International Inc. ISBN 1874780137. OCLC 42476594.
