= Khalili Collection of Japanese Art =

Private collection of Meiji-era art

The Khalili Collection of Japanese Art
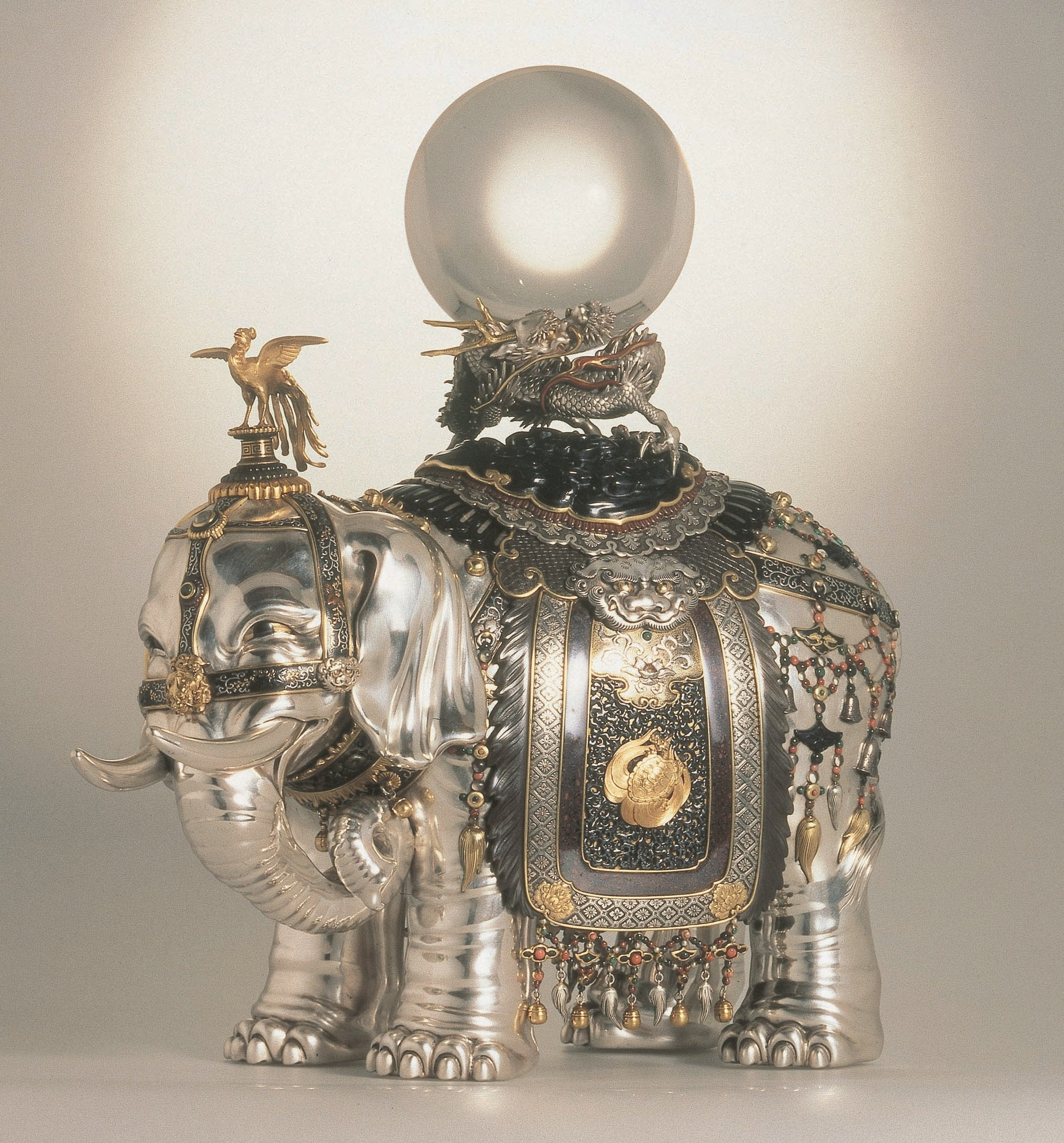
- Incense burner (Koro), silver decorated with precious metals and rock crystal, 1890
- Curators: Nasser D. Khalili (founder); Dror Elkvity (curator and chief co-ordinator); Gregory Irvine (honorary curator)
- Size (no. of items): 2,200
- Website: https://www.khalilicollections.org/all-collections/japanese-art-of-the-meiji-period/

The Khalili Collection of Japanese Art is a private collection of decorative art from Meiji-era (1868–1912) Japan, assembled by the British scholar, collector and philanthropist Nasser D. Khalili. Its 2,200 art works include metalwork, enamels, ceramics, lacquered objects, and textile art, making it comparable only to the collection of the Japanese imperial family in terms of size and quality. The Meiji era was a time when Japan absorbed some Western cultural influences and used international events to promote its art, which became very influential in Europe. Rather than covering the whole range of Meiji-era decorative art, Khalili has focused on objects of the highest technical and artistic quality. Some of the works were made by artists of the imperial court for the Great Exhibitions of the late 19th century. The collection is one of eight assembled, published, and exhibited by Khalili.

Although the collection is not on permanent public display, its objects are lent to cultural institutions and have appeared in many exhibitions from 1994 onwards. Exhibitions drawing exclusively from the collection have been held at the British Museum, Israel Museum, Van Gogh Museum, Portland Museum, Moscow Kremlin Museums, and other institutions worldwide.

== Background: the Meiji era ==
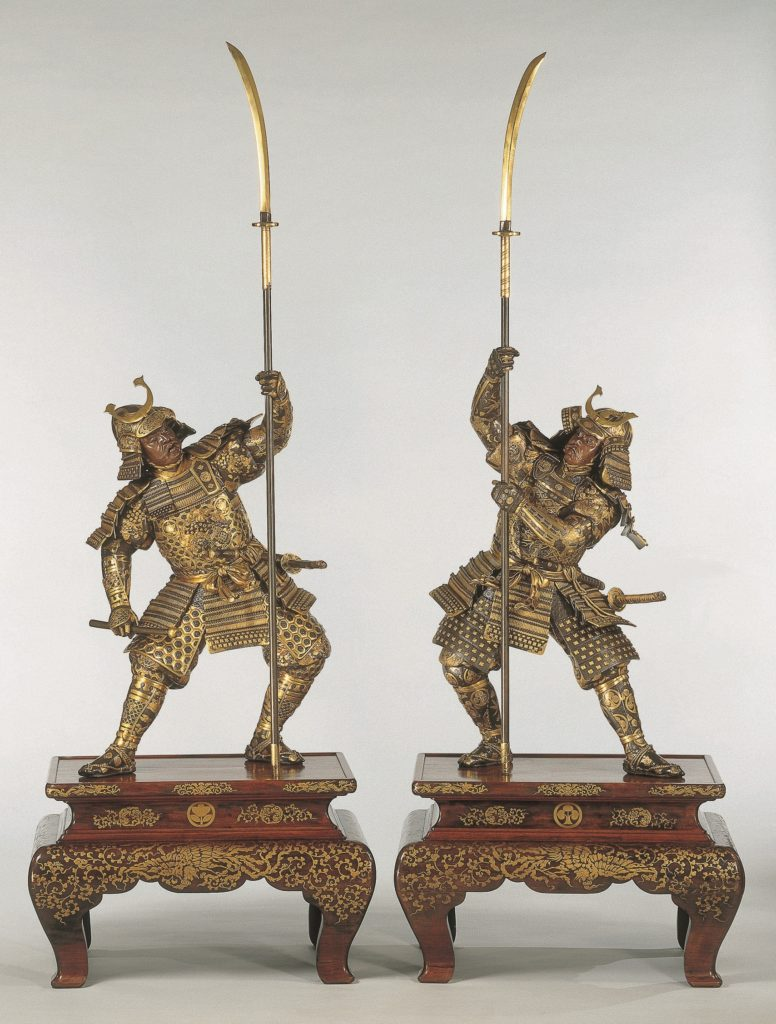
Pair of samurai figures, bronze with details in gold, silver and shakudō, 1890

The Meiji era (1868–1912) was a period of modernisation and industrialisation, during which Japan opened itself to the world. It saw a rapid introduction of Western culture to Japan, and also of Japanese culture into Europe and America. Combining Western technology and government sponsorship, Japanese decorative arts reached a new level of technical sophistication. Decorative artists working in cloisonné enamel, lacquer or metal produced works which aimed to match Western oil paintings in detail, shading and subtlety. The works received positive press reviews and shops in European capitals began to cater for a new demand for Japanese decorative art. The Khalili Collection has been used in research to study how the late 19th and early 20th century availability of Japanese art in Europe influenced European art, especially Vincent van Gogh and the impressionists.

During the embrace of Western influences, demand for Japanese art declined within Japan itself. At the same time, art objects came to be a large part of Japan's exports, actively promoted by the government which wanted to reduce the country's trade deficit with the West. The government took an active interest in the standard of art exported, exerting quality control via the Hakurankai Jimukyoku (Exhibition Bureau). The major exhibitions to which Japan sent examples of its arts and crafts included the Vienna World Exhibition of 1873, the Centennial International Exhibition of 1876 in Philadelphia, the World's Columbian Exposition in Chicago in 1893 and the Louisiana Purchase Exposition of 1901 in St. Louis.

== Khalili Collections ==
The collection is one of eight assembled by Nasser D. Khalili, each of which is considered among the most important in its field. Three of them include works from Japan: the collection of Japanese art, the Khalili Collection of Kimono, and the Khalili Collection of Enamels of the World. Khalili observed that Japanese arts were less well-documented than European arts of the same period, despite being technically superior: "Whilst one could argue it is relatively easy to replicate a Fabergé, to replicate the work of the Japanese master is nigh on impossible." As well as assembling these collections, Khalili founded the Kibo Foundation (from the Japanese word for "hope") to promote the study of art and design of the Meiji era, publishing scholarship about the collection and its historical context.

== Works ==
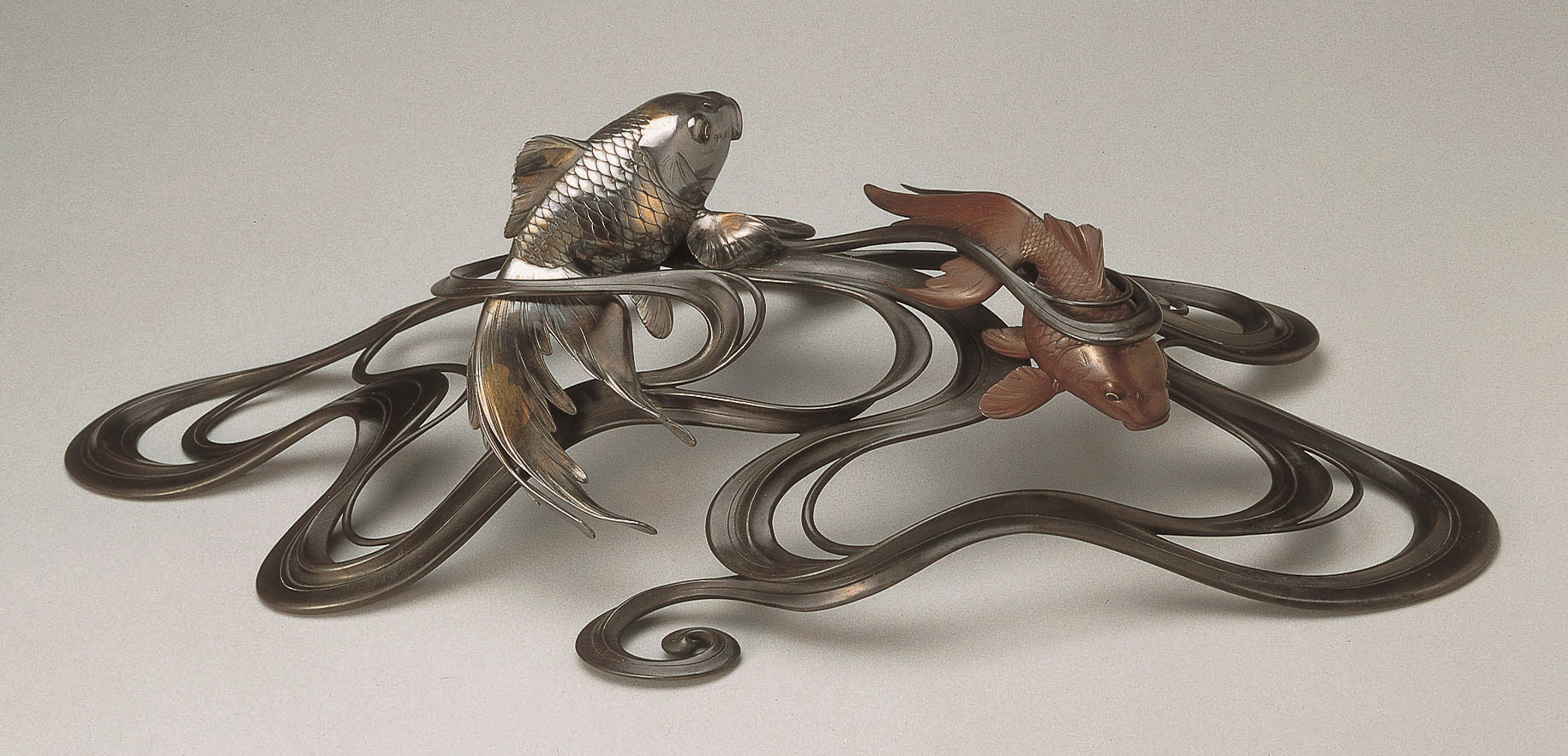
Ornament of fish in waves (Okimono) by Ōshima Joun. Bronze, silver, gilt, shibuichi and shakudō. Circa 1900

The collection includes metalwork, enamels, ceramics, and lacquered objects, including works by artists of the imperial court that were exhibited at the Great Exhibitions of the late 19th century. With more than 1,400 objects in total, it is comparable only to the collection of the Japanese imperial family in terms of size and quality. The collection catalogue published in 1995, Meiji No Takara, runs to eight volumes. Rather than covering the whole range of Meiji-era decorative art, Khalili has focused on objects of the highest technical and artistic quality. Twenty-five of the objects have emblems showing that they were commissioned by the Emperor as gifts for foreign dignitaries and royalty. Another twelve were made for international exhibitions around the turn of the 20th century.

=== Metalwork ===
Khalili's collection and documentation of Meiji era metalwork is a factor in the resurgence of interest in the topic in recent decades. The 1995 catalogue lists 161 items of metalwork, showing a variety of techniques and with themes from the history and legends of both Japan and China. Meiji era metalworkers created ambitious works in cast bronze for display at world's fairs. One such artist, eventually appointed an Artist to the Imperial Household, was Suzuki Chokichi, whose art name was Kako. Several of his works, including two intricately decorated incense burners, are in the collection.

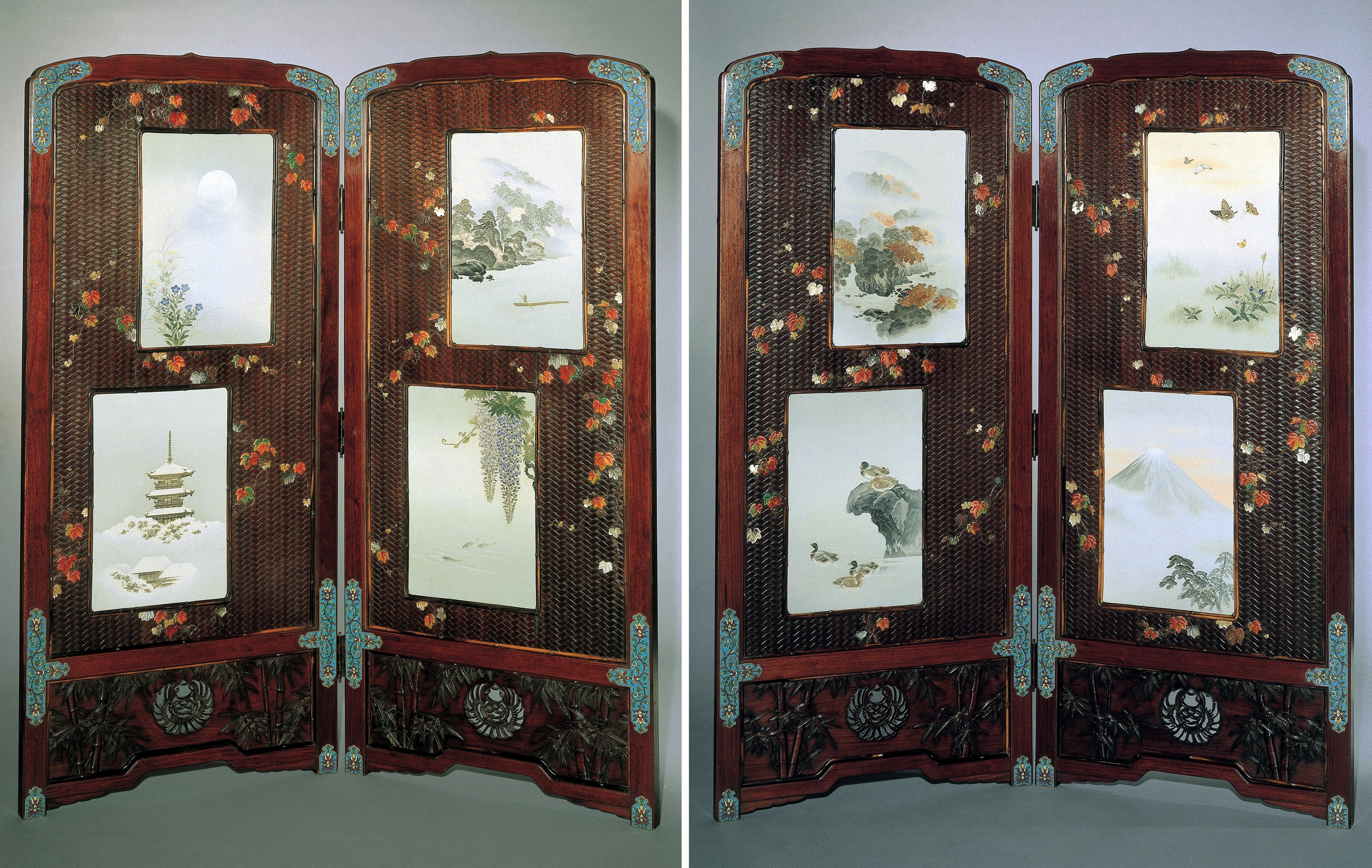
Pair of two-fold screens with cloisonné enamel panels, 1900–1905

The past history of samurai weaponry equipped Japanese metalworkers to create metallic finishes in a wide range of colours. By combining and finishing copper, silver and gold in different proportions they could give the impression of full-colour decoration. Some of these metalworkers were appointed Artists to the Imperial Household, including Kano Natsuo, Unno Shomin, Namekawa Sadakatsu, and Jomi Eisuke II, each of whom is represented in the collection. Other works include an elephant incense burner by Shoami Katsuyoshi, a sculpture of the deity Susanoo-no-Mikoto by Otake Norikuni, and a group of iron pieces by the Komai family of Kyoto, decorated with gold in a process known in the West as damascening.

=== Enamels ===
During the Meiji era, Japanese cloisonné enamel reached a technical peak, producing items more advanced than any that had existed before. Artists experimented with pastes and the firing process to produce ever larger blocks of enamel, with less need for cloisons (enclosing metal strips). Many enamel objects were exhibited in the Fine Art section of the National Industrial Exposition of 1895. There are enamels from this period, including some in the Khalili Collection, that could not be replicated with today's technology. Designs went from copies of Chinese objects to a distinctively Japanese style. The collection's near-300 cloisonné enamel objects include many works by each of three notable artists: Namikawa Yasuyuki, Namikawa Sōsuke, and Ando Jubei. These are regarded as the three great innovators of the golden age of Japanese cloisonné; they developed new firing techniques and reduced the visibility of wires. Namikawa Yasuyuki and Namikawa Sōsuke are known for introducing pictorial styles of cloisonné. An example in the collection is an incense burner by Namikawa Yasuyuki, created for presentation to the Emperor, that combines enamel with gold and shakudō to depict a landscape scene. Researchers have used the collection to establish a chronology of the development of Japanese enamelling.

Among the cloisonné enamel works is a trio of vases that have become known as the Khalili Imperial Garniture. Exhibited at the World's Columbian Exposition in Chicago, United States, in 1893, they were described as "the largest examples of cloisonné enamel ever made". From the early 1990s to 2019, Khalili acquired the three pieces, including the third which had been considered 'lost' to the art trade. The design of the vases includes the symbolic use of a dragon, chickens, and eagles, on scenes representing the four seasons of the year.

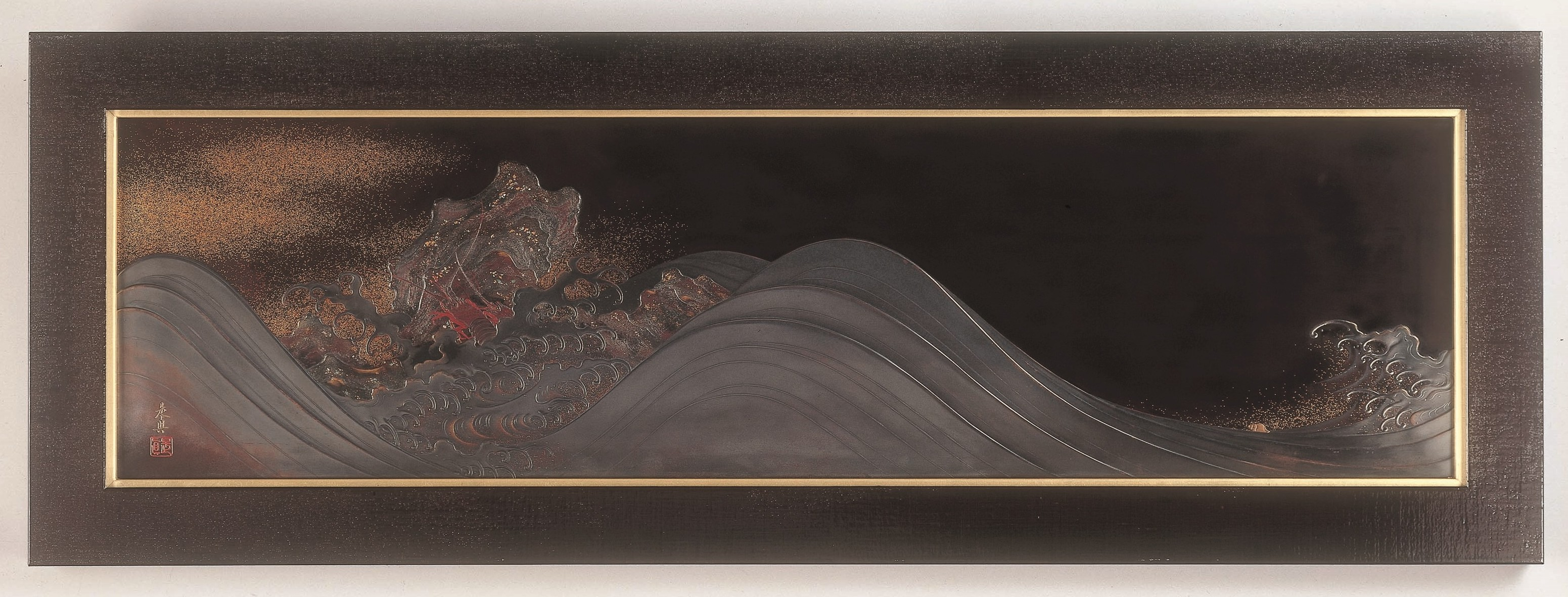
"Waves" maki-e panel by Shibata Zeshin, 1888–1890

=== Lacquer ===
Some lacquer works in the collection date from the 17th century. A hundred works are by Shibata Zeshin, who has been called Japan's greatest lacquerer. His works have an idiosyncratic, highly decorative style and the hundred works in the Khalili Collection of Japanese Art had a dedicated volume in the 1995 catalogue. Another lacquer item is a cabinet by Harui Komin, commissioned by the Japanese Crown Prince for presentation to the future King Edward VIII of the United Kingdom. Other lacquer works are by Nakayama Komin and Shirayama Shosai, who along with Shibata Zeshin are considered the three great late lacquerers of Japan. There are many examples of shibayama technique, in which designs are carved into natural materials which are inlaid in the lacquer.

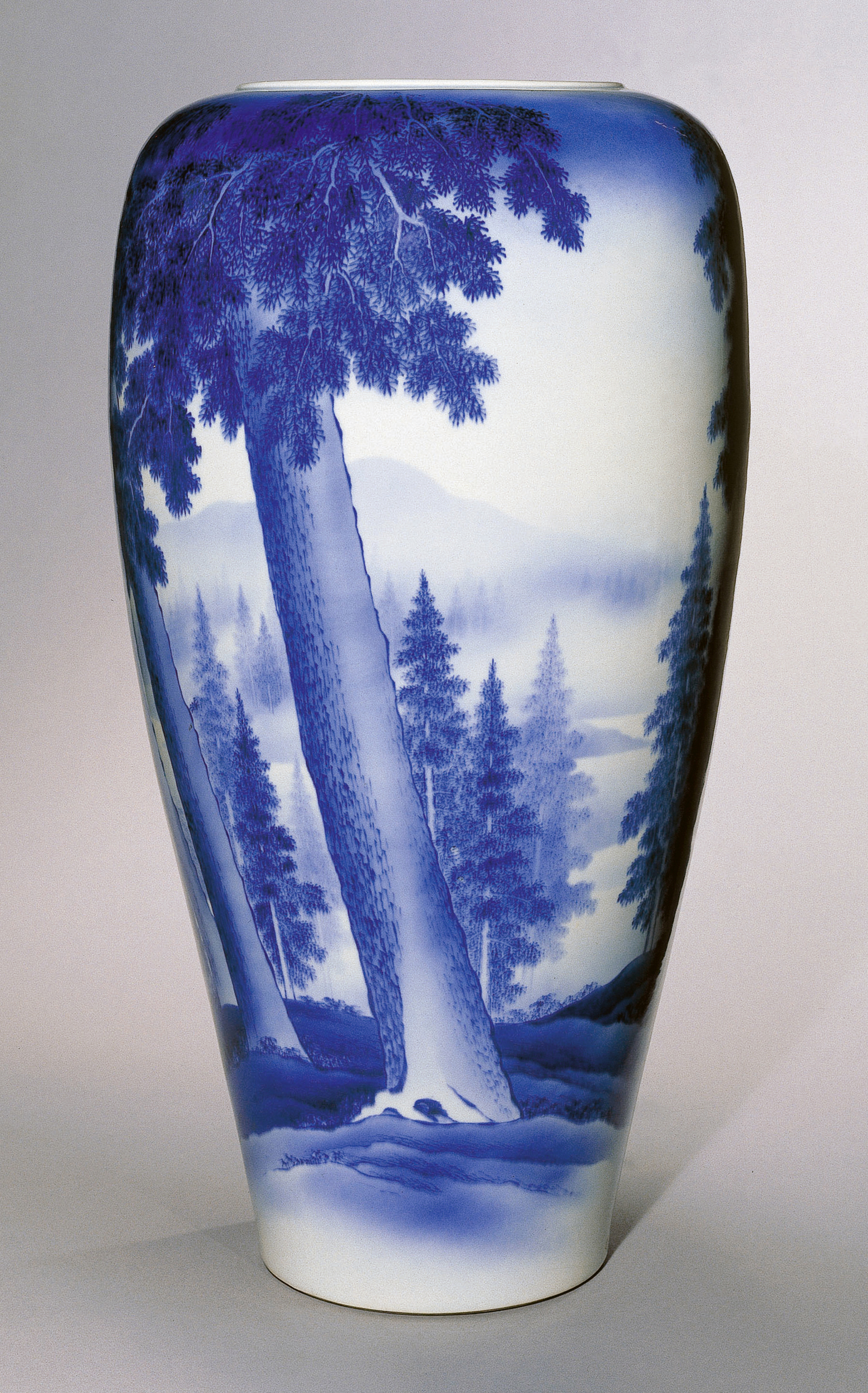
Porcelain vase decorated by Makuzu Kōzan, circa 1910

=== Porcelain ===
The collection includes, among other porcelain works, more than eighty by Miyagawa (Makuzu) Kozan, described in 1910 as Japan's greatest living ceramic artist. Kozan was the second ceramicist ever to be appointed Artist to the Imperial Household. He and his workshop transformed underglaze blue porcelain, decorating with subtleties of colour that had not previously been possible. He also made award-winning objects with flambé or crystalline glaze. Some of his works showed the influence of European graphic design, while he combined traditional Japanese and Chinese techniques with new technologies from the West. The collection illustrates how he and his son Hanzan became increasingly ambitious, introducing new colours, designs and sculptural effects in works sent to international exhibitions.

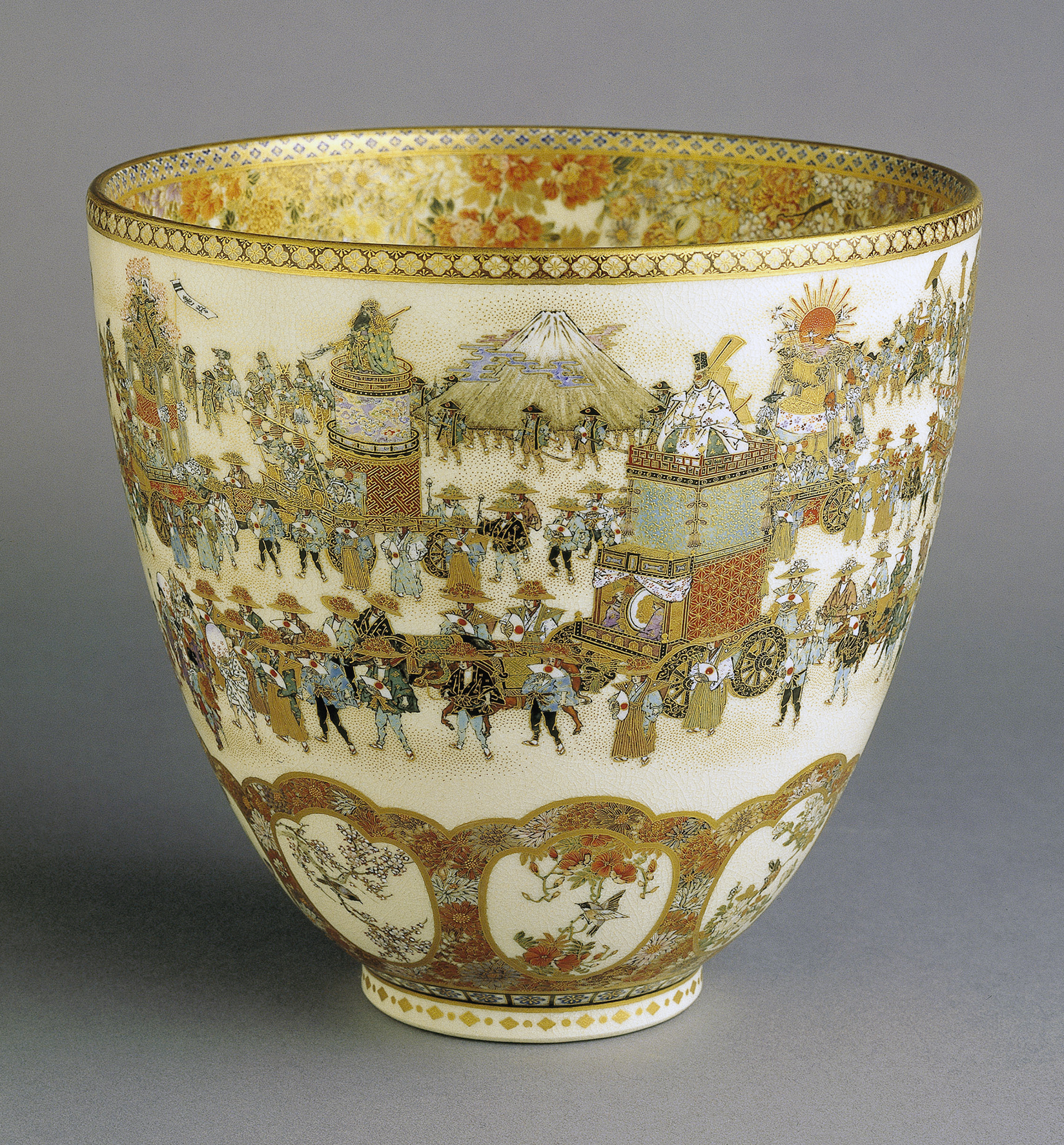
Earthenware bowl by Yabu Meizan, circa 1910

=== Earthenware ===
The 171 earthenware objects in the collection include some by Yabu Meizan and his contemporaries, typically decorated with enamel and gold. Meizan was not only a prolific producer but won multiple awards at national and international exhibitions, where his creations were exhibited as works of art. The collection shows that Meizan used Chinese as well as Japanese motifs in his decoration, drawing from sources including Buddhist imagery and the prints of Hiroshige. His designs became more intricate, sometimes using a thousand motifs in a single art work; towards the end of his career, however, he took a different approach, covering whole vases in a single motif. Kinkozan Sobei VII and Takbe Shoko are other distinctive decorators represented in the collection.

=== Textiles ===
At some world's fairs where Japan exhibited, textile art works outnumbered all other categories. These include the World's Columbian Exposition, where textile art works were displayed alongside paintings and sculpture in the Palace of Fine Arts. The collection includes over 200 examples of silk textile work from the latter half of the Meiji era, mostly produced by workshops in Kyoto. One of these was presented to Nicholas II of Russia by the Emperor during the former's visit to Japan in 1891. Other items were exhibited at Japan's fifth National Industrial Exposition of 1903. These included works by Nishimura Sozaemon, whose embroidery firm was appointed by the Imperial household.

A composite imaginary view of Japan

A lion and lioness in long grass

Padded silk panel from a set of four

== Publications ==
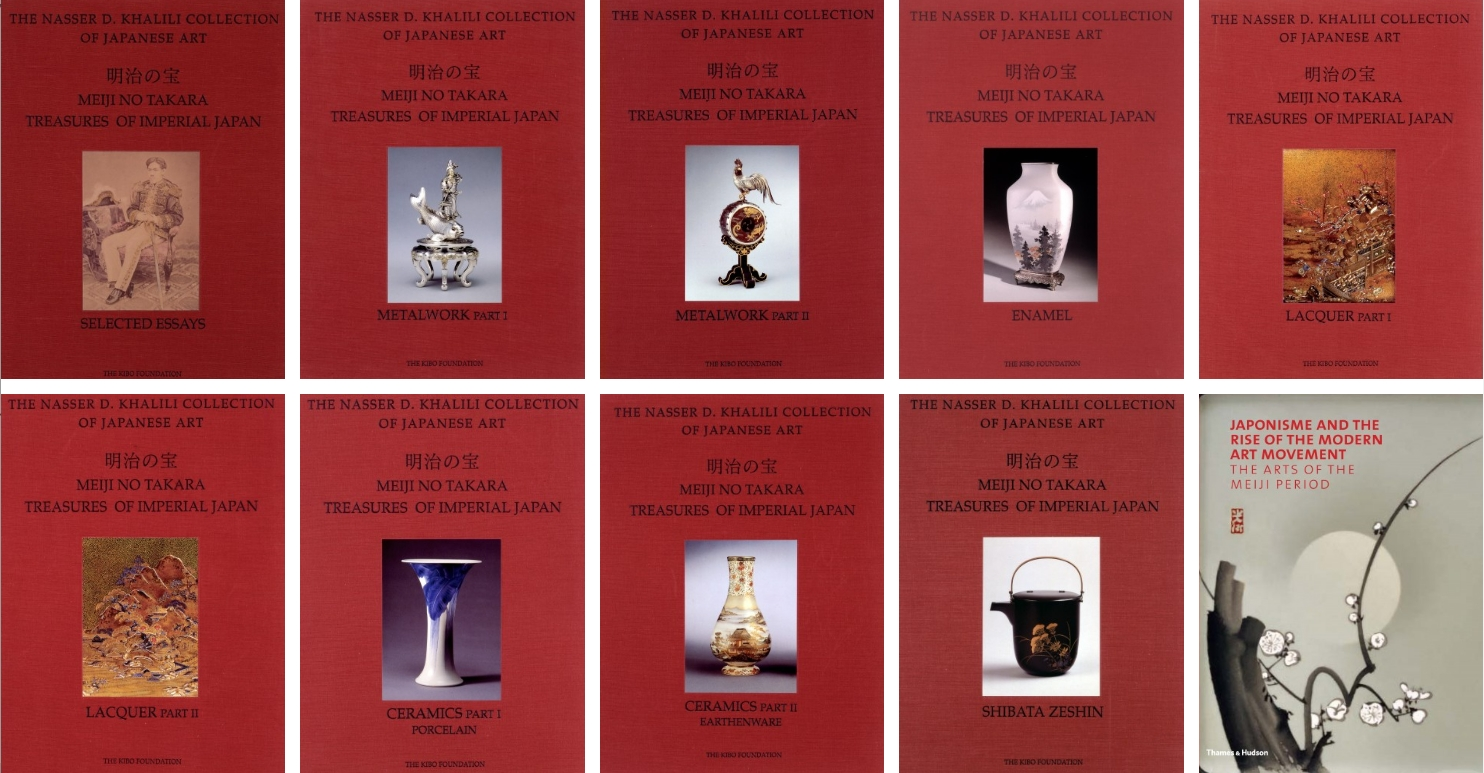
The multi-volume catalogue of the collection plus the 2013 volume on Japonisme

In 1995, the collection was documented in a multi-volume catalogue by Oliver Impey, reader in Japanese Art at the University of Oxford, and Malcolm Fairley, co-owner of the Asian Art Gallery in London. A separate volume of essays uses the collection to explore the phenomenon of Japonisme: the enthusiasm for Japanese arts in late 19th century Europe. There are also catalogues from various exhibitions.

- Harris, Victor (1994). Japanese imperial craftsmen : Meiji art from the Khalili collection. London: British Museum Press. ISBN 0714114634.
- Impey, Oliver; Fairley, Malcolm (1994). Treasures of Imperial Japan: Ceramics from the Khalili Collection. Kibo Foundation. ISBN 978-1-874780-12-0.
- Impey, Oliver; Fairley, Malcolm (1995). Volume I – Meiji No Takara – Treasures of Imperial Japan; Selected Essays. Kibo Foundation. ISBN 9781874780014.
- Impey, Oliver; Fairley, Malcolm (1995). Volume II – Meiji No Takara – Treasures of Imperial Japan; Metalwork Parts One & Two. Kibo Foundation. ISBN 9781874780021.
- Impey, Oliver; Fairley, Malcolm (1995). Volume III – Meiji No Takara – Treasures of Imperial Japan; Enamel. Kibo Foundation. ISBN 9781874780038.
- Impey, Oliver; Fairley, Malcolm; Earle, Joe (1995). Volume IV – Meiji No Takara – Treasures of Imperial Japan; Lacquer Parts One & Two. Kibo Foundation. ISBN 9781874780045.
- Impey, Oliver; Fairley, Malcolm (1995). Volume V, Part I – Meiji No Takara – Treasures of Imperial Japan; Ceramics Part One: Porcelain. Kibo Foundation. ISBN 9781874780052.
- Impey, Oliver; Fairley, Malcolm (1995). Volume V, Part II – Meiji No Takara – Treasures of Imperial Japan; Ceramics Part Two: Earthenware. Kibo Foundation. ISBN 9781874780069.
- Earle, Joe (1995). Volume VI – Meiji No Takara – Treasures of Imperial Japan; Masterpieces by Shibata Zeshin. Kibo Foundation. ISBN 9781874780083.
- Earle, Joe (1997). Shibata Zeshin : masterpieces of Japanese lacquer from the Khalili Collection. Edinburgh: National Museums of Scotland. ISBN 1-874780-09-9. OCLC 37794363.
- Earle, Joe (1999). Splendors of Meiji : treasures of imperial Japan : masterpieces from the Khalili Collection. St. Petersburg, Fla.: Broughton International Inc. ISBN 1874780137. OCLC 42476594.
- Earle, Joe (2002). Splendors of Imperial Japan : arts of the Meiji period from the Khalili Collection. London: Khalili Family Trust. ISBN 1-874780-19-6. OCLC 49043675.
- Schiermeier, Kris (2006). Wonders of imperial Japan : Meiji art from the Khalili collection. Zwolle: Waanders Publishers. ISBN 90-400-8234-0. OCLC 71522673.
- Schiermeier, Kris (2006). Japan : Meiji-Kunst & Japonismus : Aus der Sammlung Khalili. Krems: Kunsthalle. ISBN 3-901261-34-6. OCLC 150163591.
- Irvine, Gregory, ed. (2013). Japonisme and the rise of the modern art movement : the arts of the Meiji period : the Khalili collection. New York: Thames & Hudson. ISBN 978-0-500-23913-1. OCLC 853452453.
- Amelëkhina, S. A.; Амелёхина, С. А. (2017). Za granʹi︠u︡ voobrazhenii︠a︡ : sokrovishcha imperatorskoĭ I︠A︡ponii XIX - nachala XX veka iz kollekt︠s︡ii professora Khalili [Beyond Imagination: Treasures of Imperial Japan from the Khalili collection, 19th to early 20th centuries]. Moscow: Moscow Kremlin Museums. ISBN 978-5-88678-308-7. OCLC 1014032691.

== Exhibitions and loans ==
The following exhibitions were drawn exclusively from the Khalili Collection of Japanese Art.

- Japanese Imperial Craftsmen: Meiji Art from the Khalili Collection
  - September 1994 – January 1995, British Museum, London, UK
- Treasures of Imperial Japan: Ceramics from the Khalili Collection
  - October 1994 – January 1995, National Museum of Wales, Cardiff, UK
- Shibata Zeshin: Masterpieces of Japanese Lacquer from the Khalili Collection
  - April – October 1997, National Museums of Scotland, Edinburgh, UK
- Splendors of Meiji: Treasures of Imperial Japan
  - April – October 1999, First USA Riverfront Arts Centre, Wilmington, Delaware, USA
- Shibata Zeshin: Masterpieces of Japanese Lacquer from the Khalili Collection
  - October – November 1999, Toyama Sato Art Museum, Toyama, Japan
  - November 2000 – March 2001, Roemer and Pelizaeus Museum, Hildesheim, Germany
- Splendors of Imperial Japan: Arts of the Meiji Period from the Khalili Collection
  - June – September 2002, Portland Art Museum, Portland, Oregon, USA
- Splendors of Imperial Japan: Masterpieces from the Khalili Collection
  - September 2004 – February 2005, Israel Museum, Jerusalem, Israel
- Wonders of Imperial Japan: Meiji Art from the Khalili Collection
  - July – October 2006, Van Gogh Museum, Amsterdam, Netherlands
- Meiji-Kunst & Japonismus: Aus der Sammlung Khalili
  - February – June 2007, Kunsthalle Krems, Krems, Austria
- Beyond Imagination: Treasures of Imperial Japan from The Khalili Collection, 19th to early 20th century
  - July – October 2017, Moscow Kremlin Museums, Moscow, Russia

Items from the collection were lent to the following exhibitions:

- Kyoto–Tokyo: from Samurai to Manga
  - July – September 2010, Grimaldi Forum, Monaco
- Meiji, splendeurs du Japon impérial (Splendours of Imperial Japan)
  - October 2018 – January 2019, Guimet Museum, Paris

In June 2014, the Khalili Foundation made two donations of Japanese art to the UNESCO art collection. A pair of 145 centimetres (57 in) high cloisonné enamel vases were accompanied by a pair of bronze vases depicting birds in high relief.

== See also ==
- List of collections of Japanese art

== Sources ==
- Earle, Joe (1999). Splendors of Meiji: treasures of Imperial Japan: Masterpieces from the Khalili Collection. St. Petersburg, Florida: Broughton International Inc. ISBN 1874780137. OCLC 42476594.
- Guth, Christine M. E. (2015). "The Meiji era: the ambiguities of modernization". In Jackson, Anna (ed.). Kimono: the art and evolution of Japanese fashion. London: Thames & Hudson. pp. 106–111. ISBN 9780500518021. OCLC 990574229.
- Iwao, Nagasaki (2015). "Clad in the aesthetics of tradition: from kosode to kimono". In Jackson, Anna (ed.). Kimono: the art and evolution of Japanese fashion. London: Thames & Hudson. pp. 8–11. ISBN 9780500518021. OCLC 990574229.
