= Makuzu Kōzan =

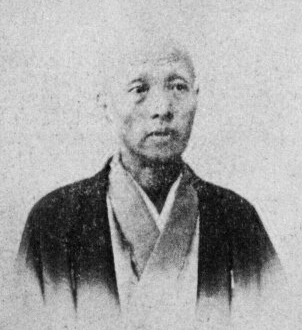
Miyagawa Kōzan I

Miyagawa Kōzan I (宮川香山) (1842–1916) was a Japanese ceramist. He was appointed artist to the Japanese Imperial household and was one of the major potters of the Meiji Era. From 1876 to 1913, Kōzan won prizes at 51 exhibitions, including the World's Fair and the National Industrial Exhibition. His name was originally Miyagawa Toranosuke. Outside Japan he is also known as Makuzu Kōzan.

== Early life ==
Miyagawa came from a long line of potters based in Kyoto: his father Miyagawa Chōzō (宮川長造, 1797–1860), known as Makuzu Chōzō (真葛長造), had studied with Aoki Mokubei (青木木米, 1767–1833). After Aoki's death, he set up at Makuzugahara, in the Gion district of Kyoto. The title Makuzu was given by Yasui no Miya, a Shingon monk; the artistic name Kōzan by Kachō no Miya of Chion-in. Both the givers of the names were monzeki (prince-abbots) connected to the Imperial family.

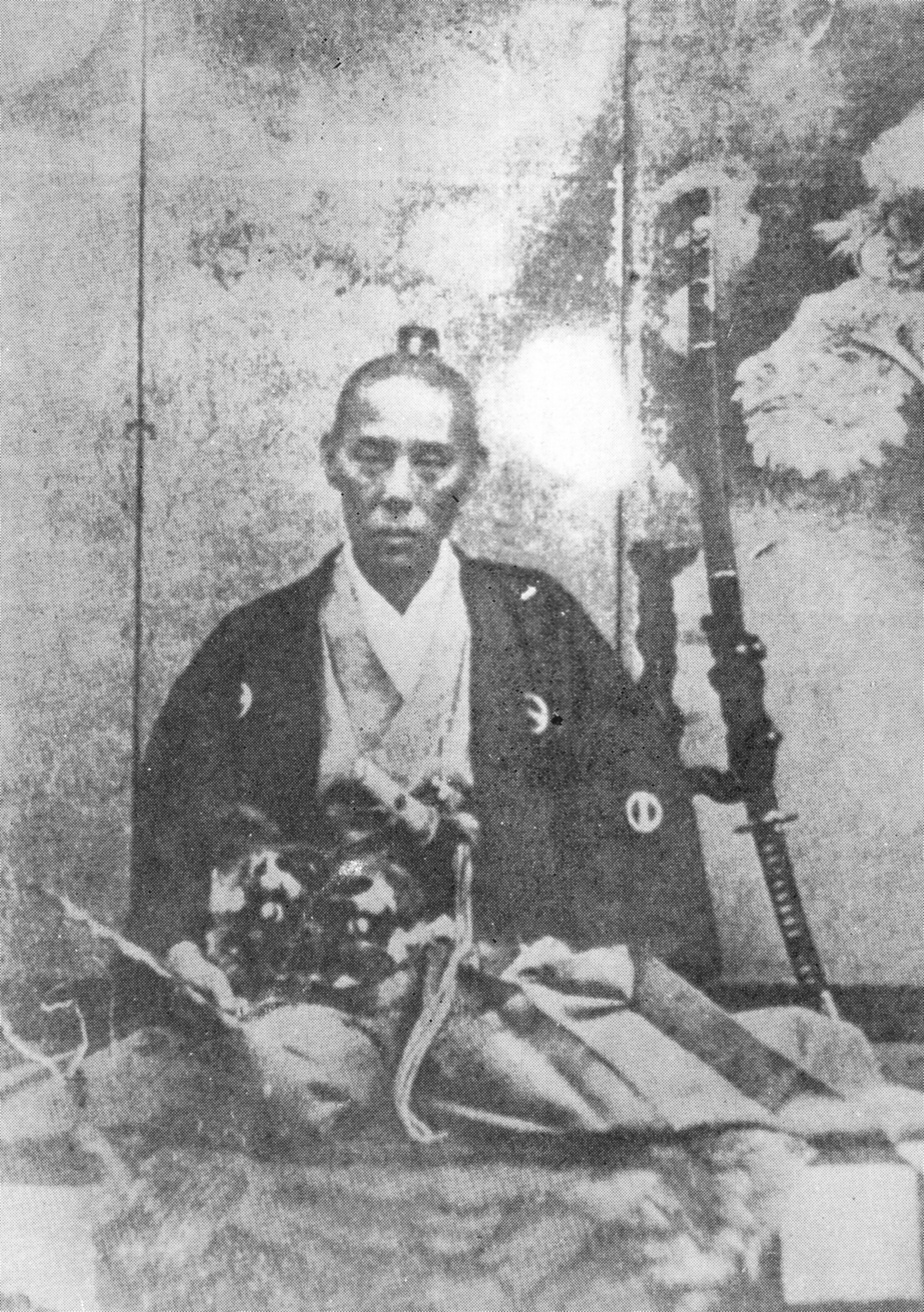
Igi Tadazumi (1818–1886), patron of Makuzu Kōzan

Miyagawa Toranosuke was the fourth son of the family. As Makuzu Kōzan, he took over the family business in 1860, at the age of 18. He had studied with a local bunjinga artist, the future Taigadō IV of the Ike no Taiga line, from age nine. Initially he made tea utensils, as his father had. By the late 1860s he had invitations to move elsewhere. One, from Komatsu Tatewaki, came to nothing; another, to work at the Igi family kiln near Bizen, was from Igi Tadazumi, as head of the family, and he accepted in 1867. It was at Mushiage, located in what is now Oku-chō, part of Setouchi. Kōzan worked there for two years, on blue-and-white wares.

== Yokohama years ==
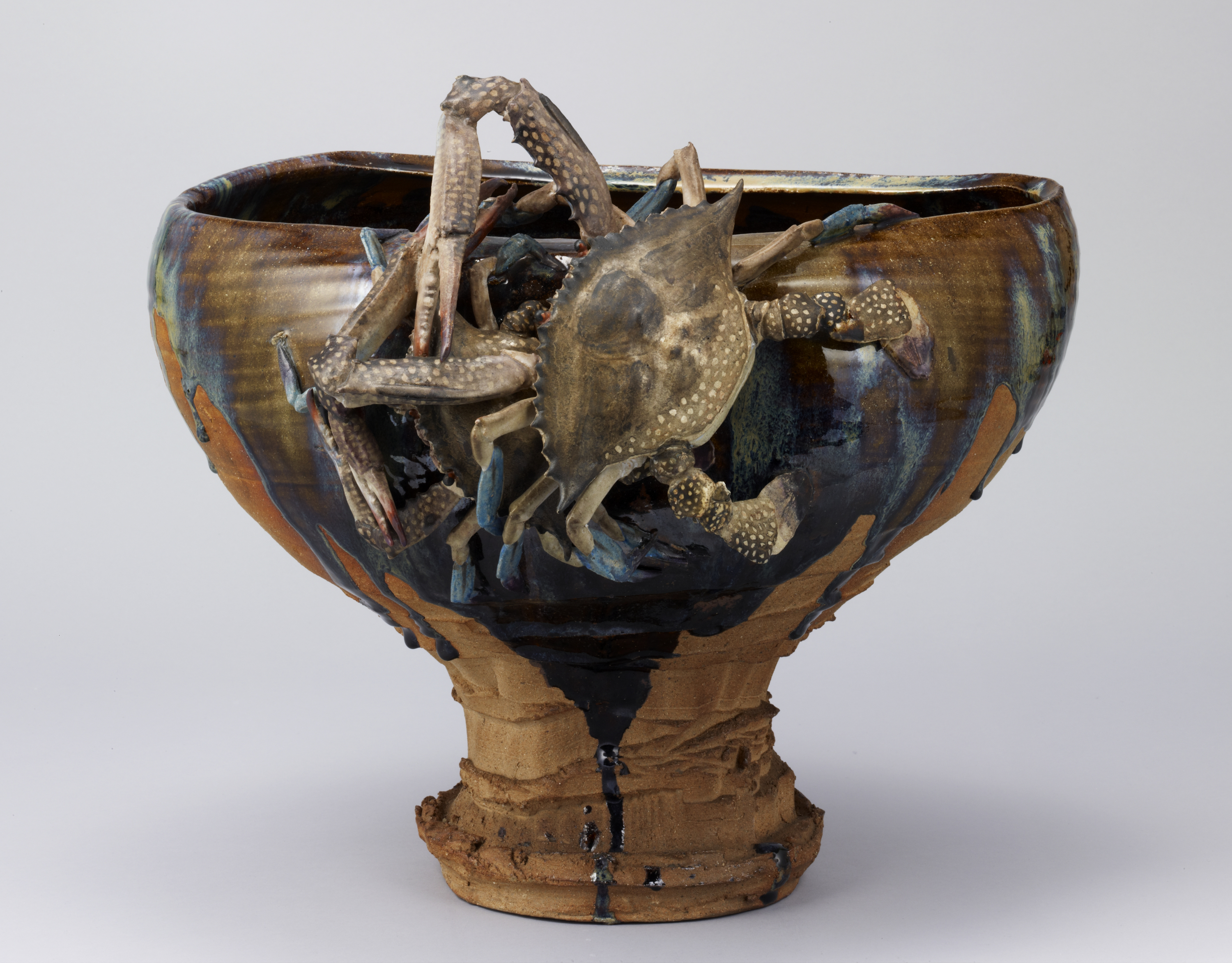
Footed Bowl with Crabs, 1881 (Important Cultural Property)

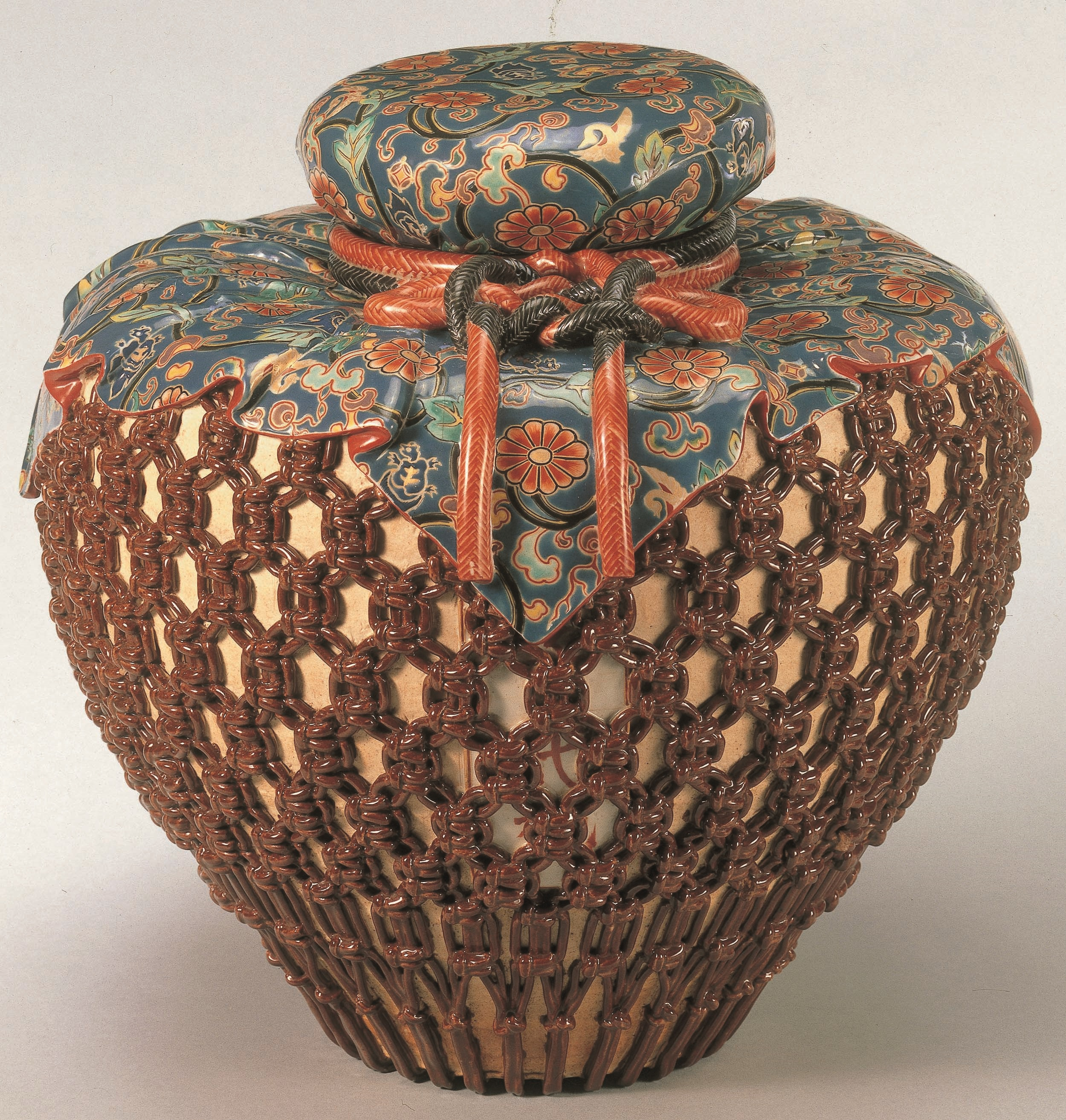
Jar and Cover, between 1910 and 1915. The rope and cloth covering the jar are all expressed in porcelain.

Kōzan's period in Bizen had coincided with the political changes of the Meiji Restoration. In 1870 he set up a workshop in Yokohama, newly opened as a treaty port. He moved to the Kantō at the invitation of Umeda Hannosuke, a Tokyo merchant who was interested in exporting Satsuma ware. The deal involved Suzuki Yasubei, brother-in-law to Umeda, on the business side, and Suzuki helped finance the kiln. After a serious fire in 1876, Kōzan rebuilt out of his own pocket, freeing himself from the partnership. After a few years, Suzuki was bankrupted, and Kōzan then sold what he manufactured on his own account.

At this time Yokohama still resembled the fishing village it had been, and there was no ceramic or even craft tradition. Suzuki found for Kōzan a site (about 0.3 ha) in Nishiōta (present-day Kanoedai in the central ward of Yokohama). The kiln built there took the name Ōta. The Kantō was also poor in suitable clay, and initially Kōzan had to prospect widely for his materials. Bringing four apprentices from Kyoto, Kōzan by 1872 had overcome the initial problems, and expanded his workshop with a large recruitment of local men and women. This was the period at which modern Satsuma ware was distressed for export as antique, and Pollard considers that, up to 1876 at least, there was truth in the allegation of Frank Brinkley that the Makuzu workshop participated in the fraudulent trade. Johannes Justus Rein visited the business in the mid-1870s.

The Meiji Restoration had brought about a collapse of the old regulation and financing of kilns. Kōzan was at the forefront of the successor policy of industrial development, which included crafts, called shokusan kōgyō. He exhibited at the Centennial Exposition of 1876, in Philadelphia, a wide range of ceramic wares, including high relief vessels presaging later work. In the aftermath, much attention was paid to Japanese ceramics for the next few years in Cincinnati, and the Japonisme reached the Rookwood Pottery Company. Kōzan also showed much development of lines quite independent of the Satsuma ware at First National Industrial Exposition of 1877 in Tokyo. This exposition was where the Emperor touched a Kōzan vase; a moment which made the artist famous. At the Paris Exposition Universelle of 1889, he won a gold medal for his yohen (transmutation) glazes. The 1893 World's Columbian Exposition in Chicago won an Honorary Gold Medal for the workshop for a pair of elaborate stoneware vases.

At the Exposition Universelle (1900) in Paris, Japanese ceramics in general did not fare well. Kōzan was the only grand prix winner, for a pair of large stoneware vases and basin. The technically demanding manufacture was supported by the Ministry of Agriculture and Commerce. His other exhibits showed innovative design, and an appreciation of Western taste. He continued to experiment for the rest of his life, particularly with glazes, despite some health and money problems.

At the Japan-British Exhibition of 1910, a vase by Kōzan was described as "a perfect piece both artistically and technically, very simple in line, and classic in shape, and quite artistic in the design of the matchless chrysanthemums, the pride of our country." In 1911, the Imperial family commissioned a vase as a gift for the King of the Belgians.

== Style ==
The most distinctive feature of Kozan's works in the early period was the unprecedented amount of three-dimensional sculptures applied to them. This three-dimensional decoration technique was called Takaukibori (高浮彫). This was an epoch-making technique that was able to create three-dimensional shapes at a low cost compared to Satsuma ware, which requires a high production cost to create three-dimensional shapes using gold. Birds such as raptors and Pigeons, mammals such as bears and cats, crustaceans such as crabs, plants such as cherry blossoms and grapes, and fictional creatures such as oni and anthropomorphic frogs were frequently used as motifs for sculptures. During the 1890s Kōzan developed a style of decoration that combined multiple underglaze colours on each item. The technical sophistication of his underglazes increased during this decade as he continued to experiment. In the decade from 1900 to 1910 there was a substantial change in the shape and decoration of his works, reflecting Western influences. And his vigorous pursuit of glaze research and perfection transformed his work into a flat, colorful, transparent design. His work strongly influenced Western perceptions of Japanese design. He sometimes used designs from the Qing dynasty, especially dragon motifs.

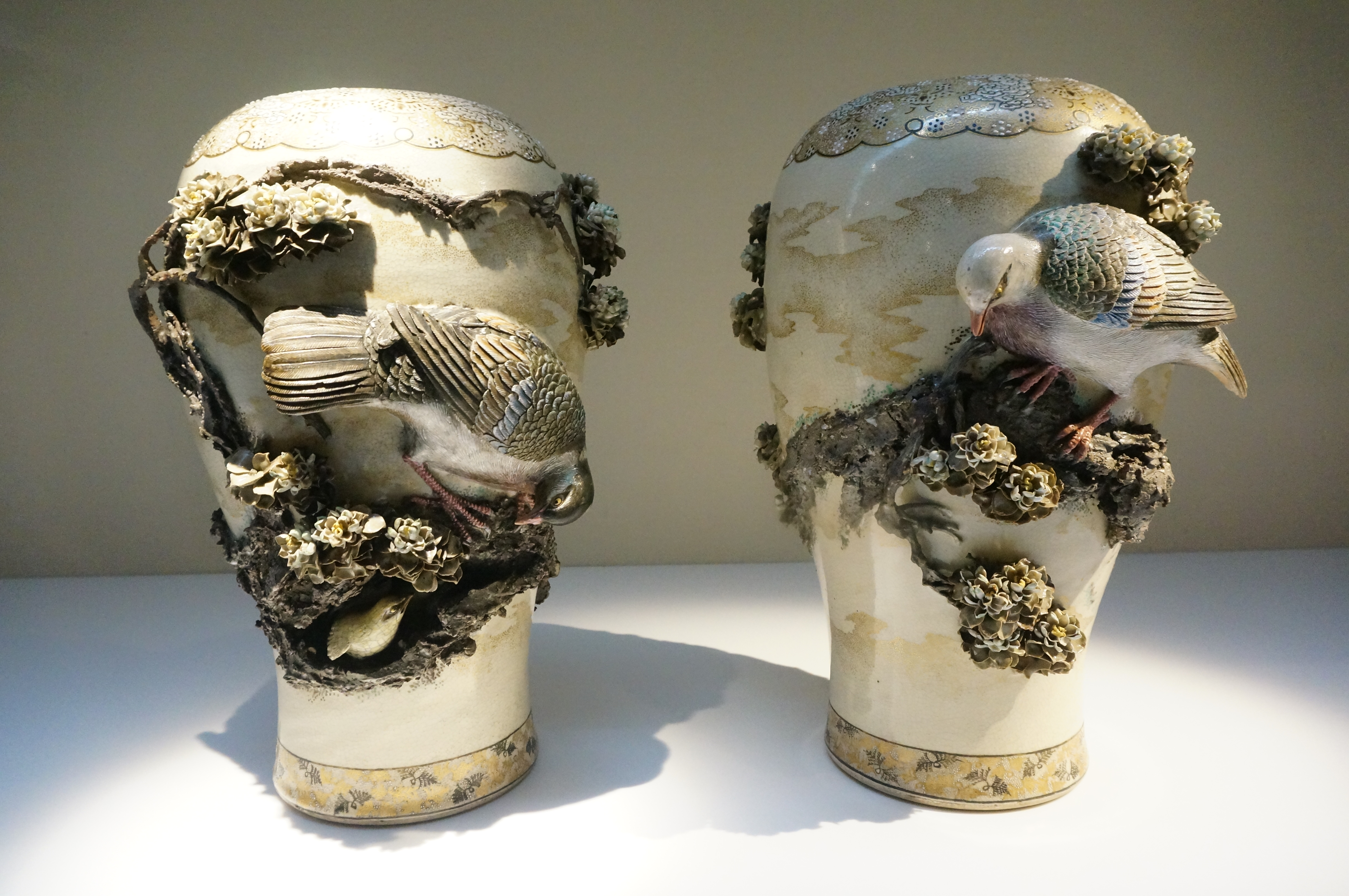
Pigeon and Cherry Blossom, 1871-1882

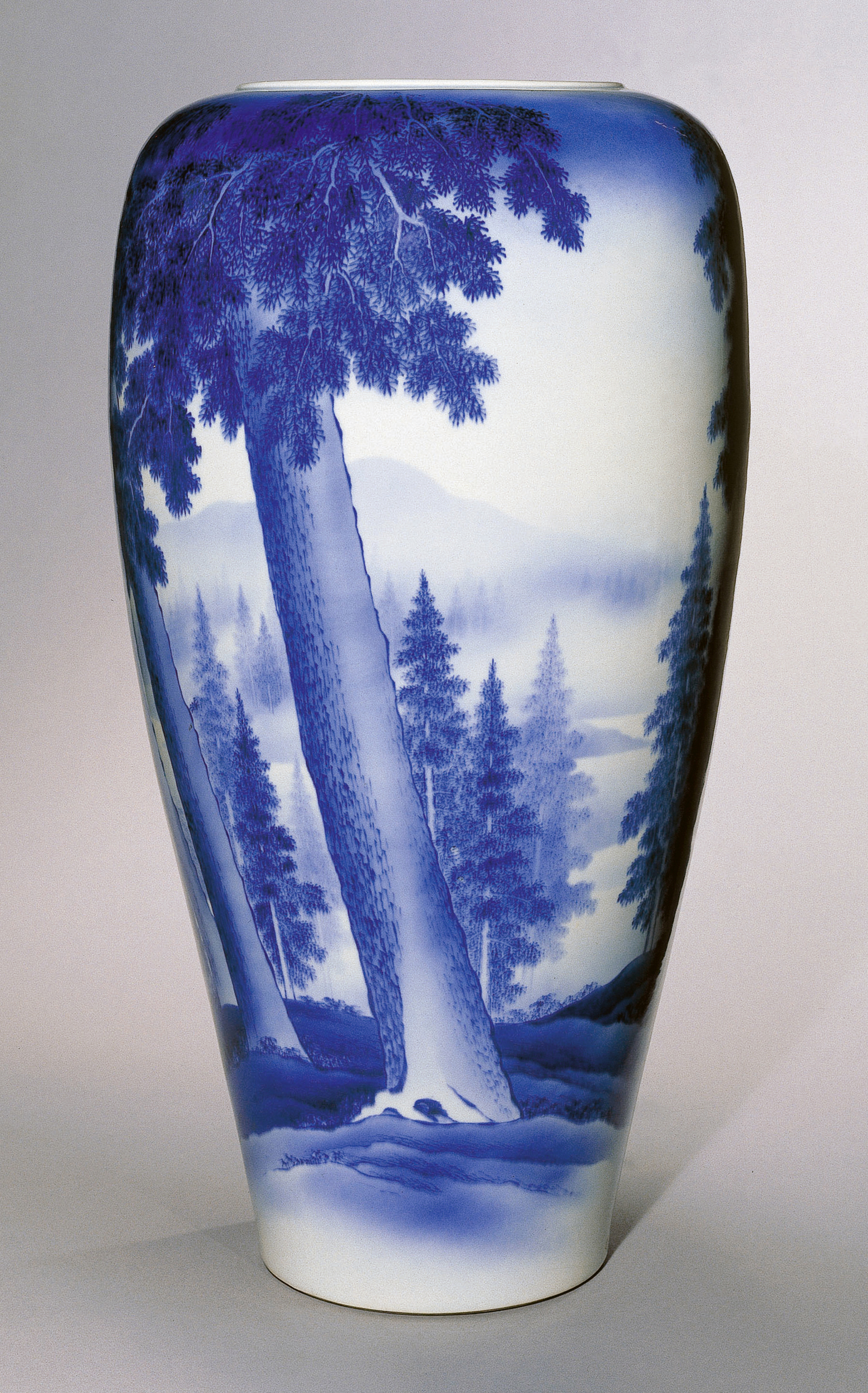
Vase, circa 1910

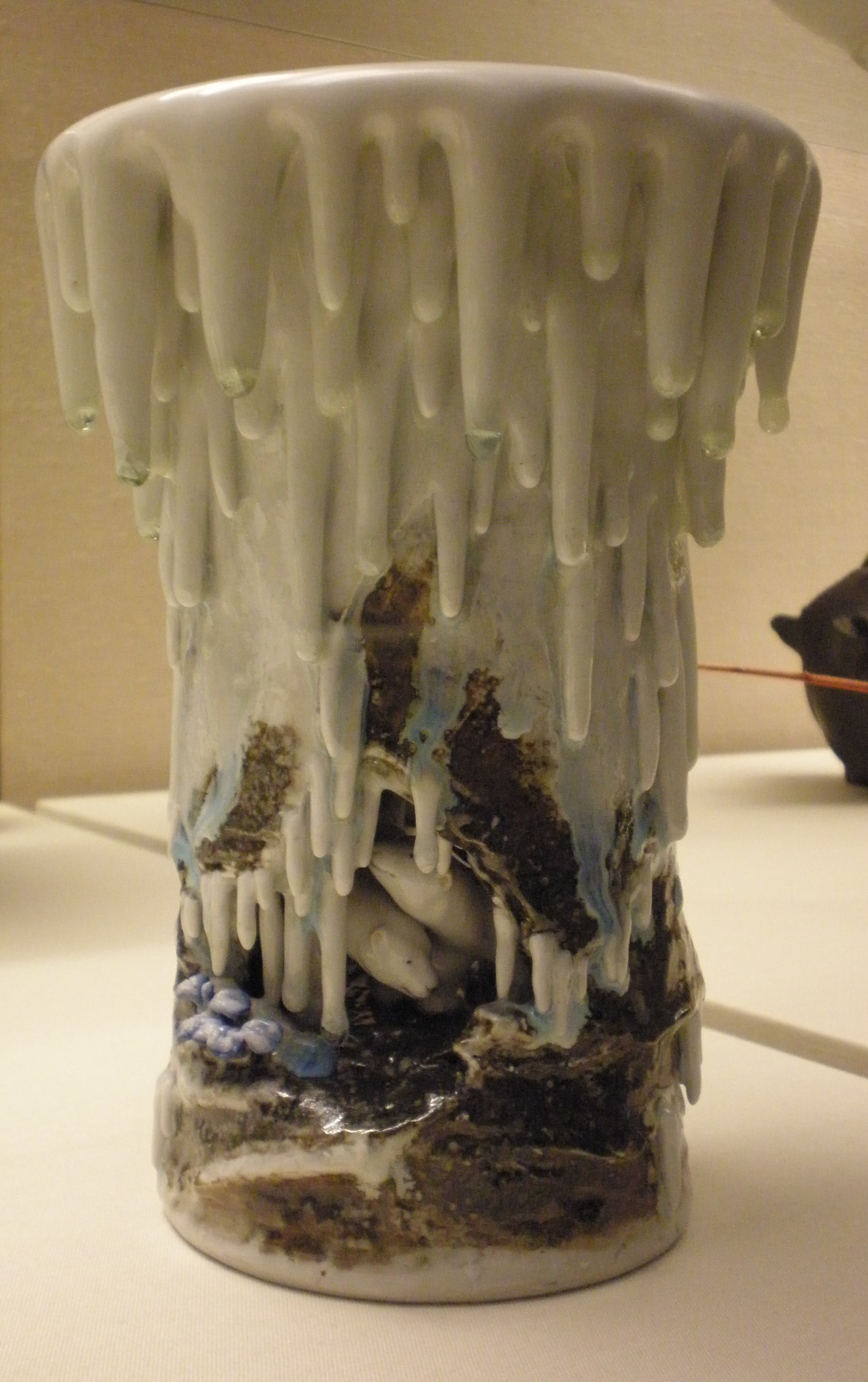
Vase shown at the Japan–British Exhibition of 1910, showing two bears in an icy cave

== Legacy ==
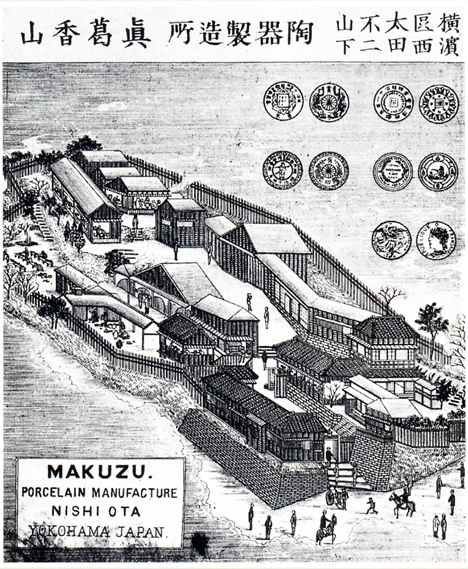
Drawing of the Makuzu Kōzan Pottery Factory

Kōzan's successor was his adopted son Miyagawa Hannosuke (Hanzan) (1859–1940), known as Makuzu Kōzan II. Hannosuke's father was Chōhei (長平), heir to the house, who had died shortly after his own father of Miyagawa Chōzō. The Makuzu business in Yokohama was destroyed by bombing in 1945. Makuzu Kōzan IV (Miyagawa Tomonosuke, 1884–1959) did continue the business, with difficulty, after World War II.

After Kōzan had left Kyoto, the Makuzu business there was continued by Zen-ō Jihei Kōsai (1846–1922), an employee of Chōzō. He took the name Miyagawa Kōsai, and maintained the traditional line of tea utensils. The family was still active at the end of the 20th century.

The largest collector of Kōzan's works is Tetsundo Tanabe, who owns hundreds of works. In 2016, the Suntory Museum of Art held the largest exhibition of works by Kōzan, almost exclusively for works owned by Tanabe. Hirosi Yamamoto, a collector living in Yokohama, runs the Makuzu ware Museum, displaying some of his collection and publishing some photo books of Makuzu ware.

More than eighty of Kōzan's works are today in the Khalili Collection of Japanese Art. Some were included in the 1999 Splendours of Meiji: Treasures of Imperial Japan exhibition in the United States.

== Sources ==
- Earle, Joe (1999). Splendors of Meiji : treasures of imperial Japan : masterpieces from the Khalili Collection. St. Petersburg, Fla.: Broughton International Inc. ISBN 1874780137. OCLC 42476594.
- Pollard, Moyra Clare (2002). Master Potter of Meiji Japan: Makuzu Kōzan (1842-1916) and His Workshop. Oxford University Press. ISBN 978-0-19-925255-8.
