= Vitreous enamel =

Material made by fusing powdered glass to a substrate by firing

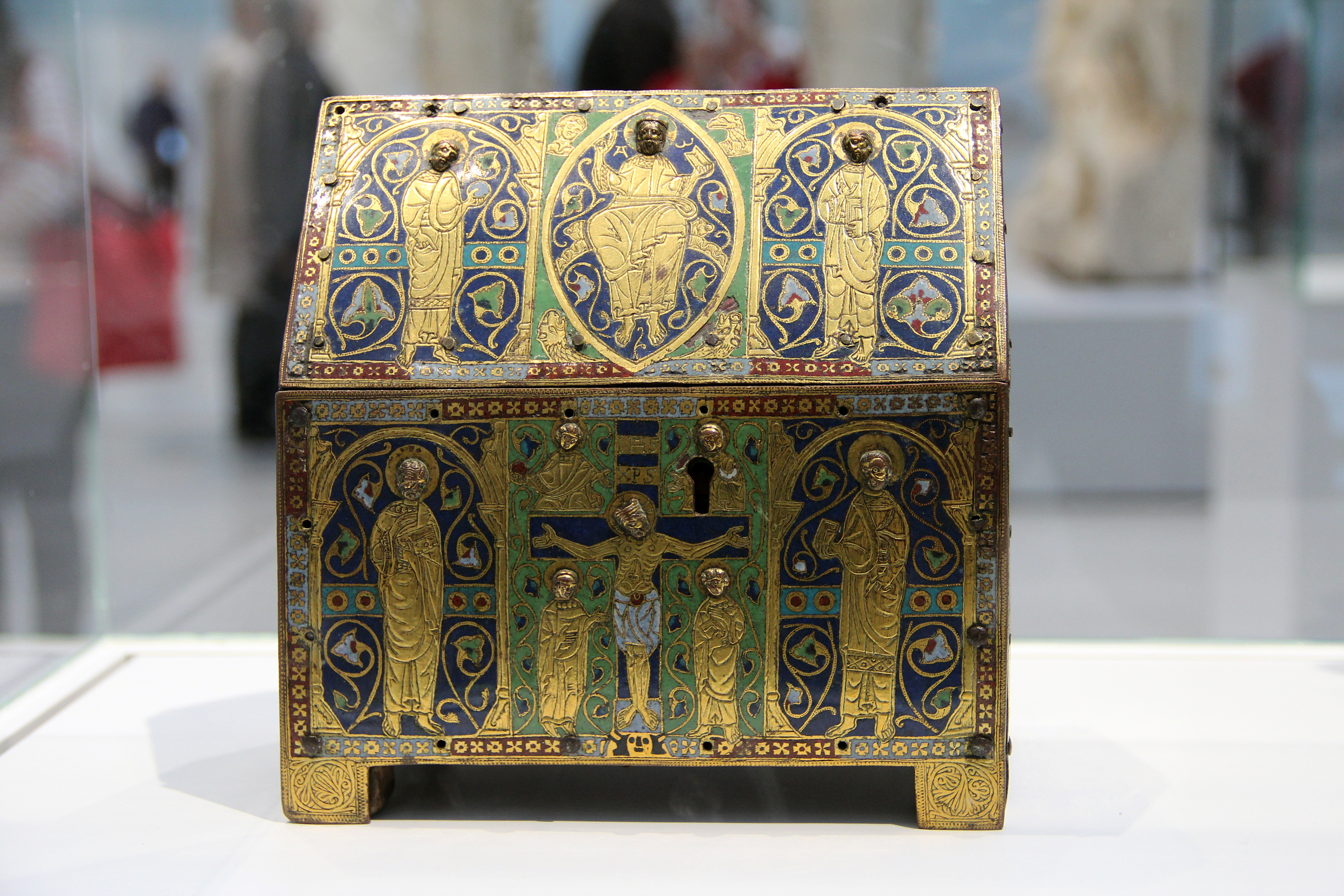
Gothic châsse; 1185–1200; champlevé enamel over copper gilded; height: 17.7 cm (7.0 in), width: 17.4 cm (6.9 in), depth: 10.1 cm (4.0 in)

Vitreous enamel, also called porcelain enamel, is a material made by fusing powdered glass to a substrate by firing, usually between 520 and 880 °C (968 and 1,616 °F). The powder melts, flows, and then hardens to a smooth, durable vitreous coating. The word vitreous comes from the Latin vitreus, meaning "glassy".

Enamel can be used on metal, glass, ceramics, stone, or any material that will withstand the fusing temperature. In technical terms fired enamelware is an integrated layered composite of glass and another material (or more glass). The term "enamel" is most often restricted to work on metal, which is the subject of this article. Essentially the same technique used with other bases is known by different terms: on glass as enamelled glass, or "painted glass", and on pottery it is called overglaze decoration, "overglaze enamels" or "enamelling". The craft is called "enamelling", the artists "enamellers" and the objects produced can be called "enamels".

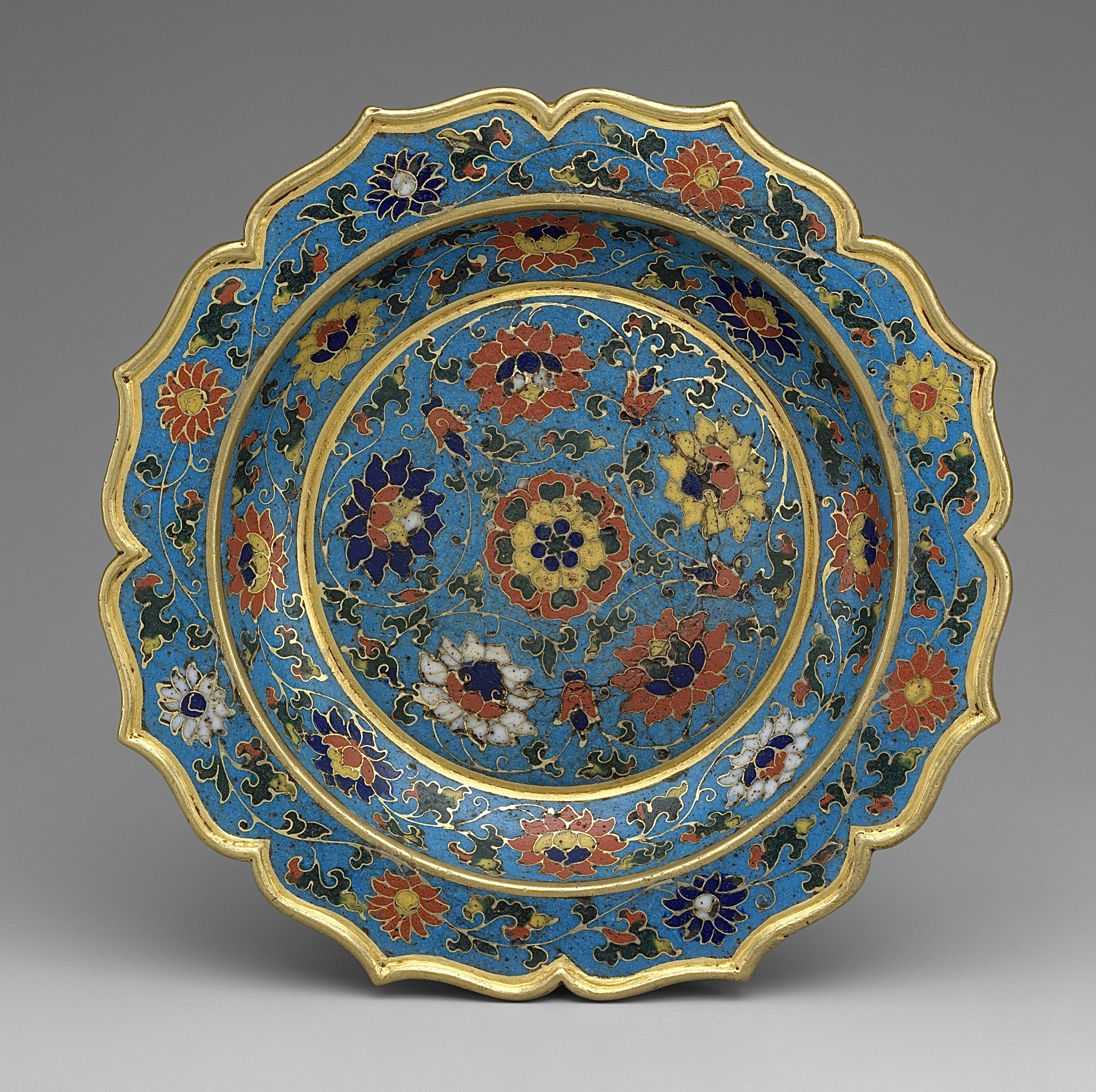
Chinese dish with scalloped rim, from the Ming dynasty; early 15th century; cloisonné enamel; height: 2.5 cm, diameter: 15.2 cm

Enamelling is an old and widely adopted technology, for most of its history mainly used in jewellery and decorative art. Since the 18th century, enamels have also been applied to many metal consumer objects, such as some cooking vessels, steel sinks, and cast-iron bathtubs. It has also been used on some appliances, such as dishwashers, laundry machines, and refrigerators, and on marker boards and signage.

The term "enamel" has also sometimes been applied to industrial materials other than vitreous enamel, such as enamel paint and the polymers coating enameled wire; these actually are very different in materials science terms.

The word enamel comes from the Old High German word smelzan (to smelt) via the Old French esmail, or from a Latin word smaltum, first found in a 9th-century Life of Leo IV. Used as a noun, "an enamel" is usually a small decorative object coated with enamel. "Enamelled" and "enamelling" are the preferred spellings in British English, while "enameled" and "enameling" are preferred in American English.

== History ==
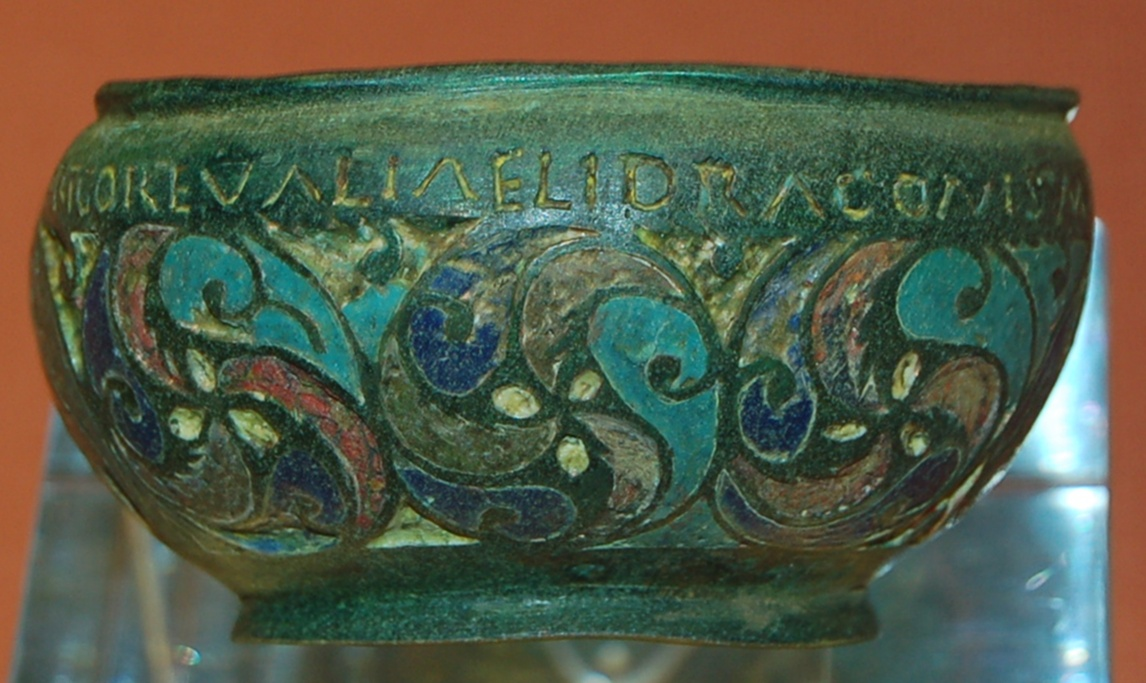
Staffordshire Moorlands Pan, 2nd-century Roman Britain

=== Ancient ===
The earliest enamel all used the cloisonné technique, placing the enamel within small cells with gold walls. This had been used as a technique to hold pieces of stone and gems tightly in place since the 3rd millennium BC, for example in Mesopotamia, and then Egypt. Enamel seems likely to have developed as a cheaper method of achieving similar results.

The earliest undisputed objects known to use enamel are a group of Mycenaean rings from Cyprus, dated to the 13th century BC. Although Egyptian pieces, including jewellery from the Tomb of Tutankhamun of c. 1325 BC, are frequently described as using "enamel", many scholars doubt the glass paste was sufficiently melted to be properly so described, and use terms such as "glass-paste". It seems possible that in Egyptian conditions the melting point of the glass and gold were too close to make enamel a viable technique. Nonetheless, there appear to be a few actual examples of enamel, perhaps from the Third Intermediate Period of Egypt (beginning 1070 BC) on. But it remained rare in both Egypt and Greece.

The technique appears in the Koban culture of the northern and central Caucasus, and was perhaps carried by the Sarmatians to the ancient Celts. Red enamel is used in 26 places on the Battersea Shield (c.350–50 BC), probably as an imitation of the red Mediterranean coral, which is used on the Witham Shield (400–300 BC). Pliny the Elder mentions the Celts' use of the technique on metal, which the Romans in his day hardly knew. The Staffordshire Moorlands Pan is a 2nd-century AD souvenir of Hadrian's Wall, made for the Roman military market, which has swirling enamel decoration in a Celtic style. In Britain, probably through preserved Celtic craft skills, enamel survived until the hanging bowls of early Anglo-Saxon art.

A problem that adds to the uncertainty over early enamel is artefacts (typically excavated) that appear to have been prepared for enamel, but have now lost whatever filled the cloisons or backing to a champlevé piece. This occurs in several different regions, from ancient Egypt to Anglo-Saxon England. Once enamel becomes more common, as in medieval Europe after about 1000, the assumption that enamel was originally used becomes safer.

=== Medieval and Renaissance Europe ===
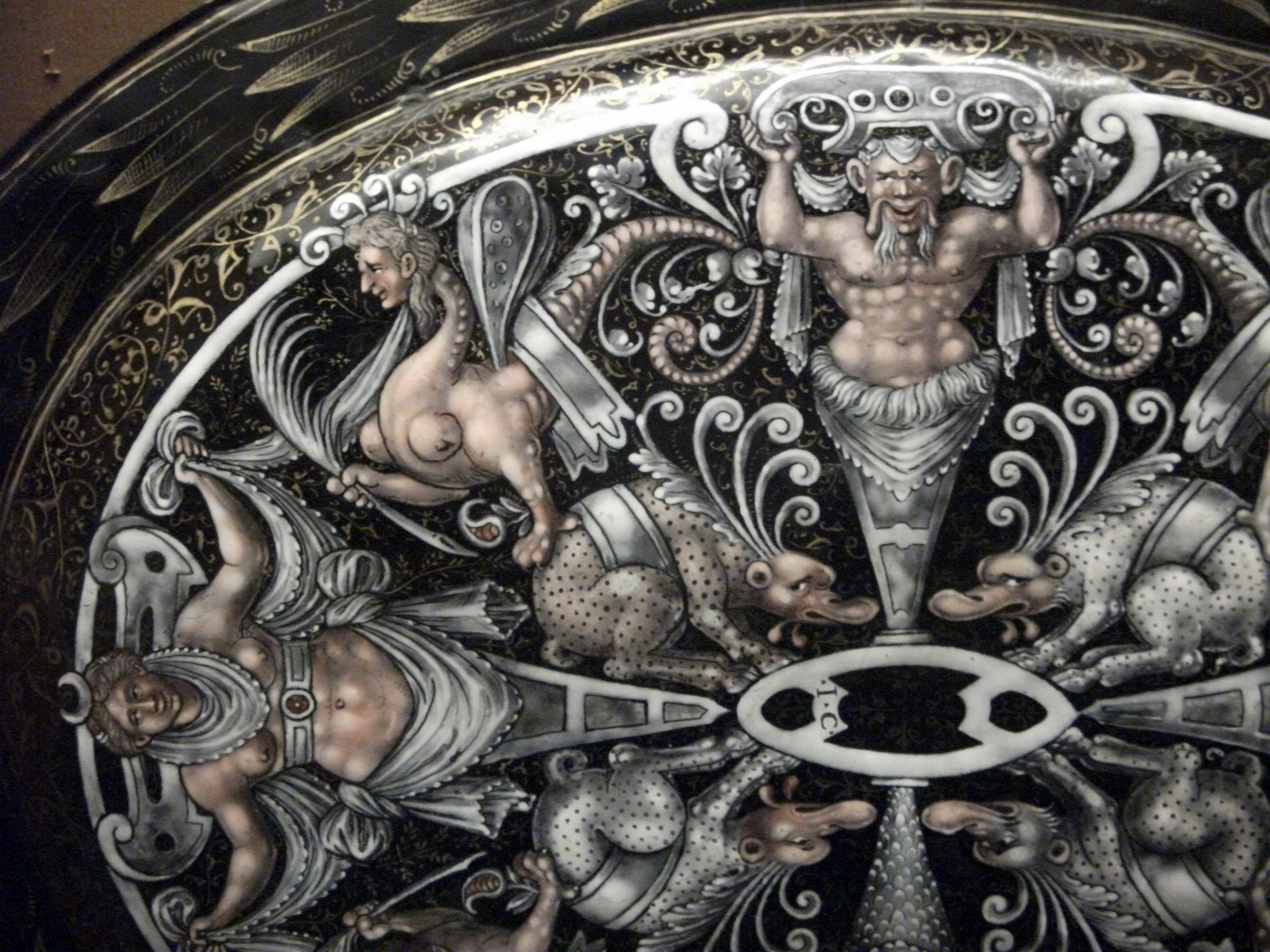
Detail of painted Limoges enamel dish, mid-16th century, attributed to Jean de Court

In European art history, enamel was at its most important in the Middle Ages, beginning with the Late Romans and then the Byzantine, who began to use cloisonné enamel in imitation of cloisonné inlays of precious stones. The Byzantine enamel style was widely adopted by the peoples of Migration Period northern Europe. The Byzantines then began to use cloisonné more freely to create images; this was also copied in Western Europe. In Kievan Rus a finift enamel technique was developed.

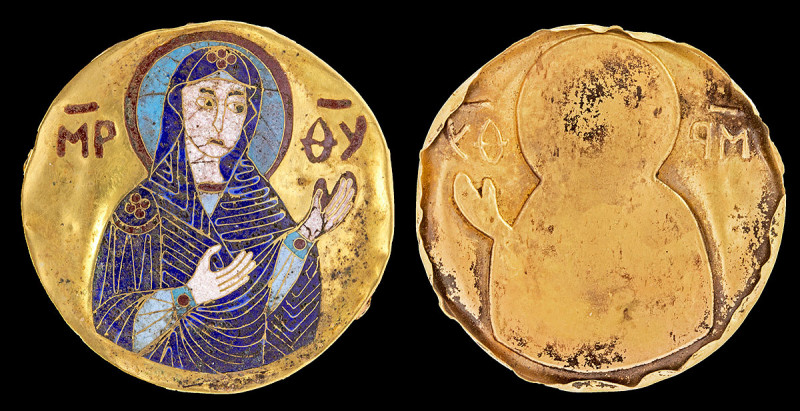
Byzantine cloisonné enamel

Mosan metalwork often included enamel plaques of the highest quality in reliquaries and other large works of goldsmithing. Limoges enamel was made in Limoges, France, the most famous centre of vitreous enamel production in Western Europe, though Spain also made a good deal. Limoges became famous for champlevé enamels from the 12th century onwards, producing on a large scale, and then (after a period of reduced production) from the 15th century retained its lead by switching to painted enamel on flat metal plaques. The champlevé technique was considerably easier and very widely practiced in the Romanesque period. In Gothic art the finest work is in basse-taille and ronde-bosse techniques, but cheaper champlevé works continued to be produced in large numbers for a wider market.

Painted enamel remained in fashion for over a century, and in France developed into a sophisticated Renaissance and the Mannerist style, seen on objects such as large display dishes, ewers, inkwells and in small portraits. After it fell from fashion it continued as a medium for portrait miniatures, spreading to England and other countries. This continued until the early 19th century.

A Russian school developed, which used the technique on other objects, as in the Renaissance, and for relatively cheap religious pieces such as crosses and small icons.

=== China ===
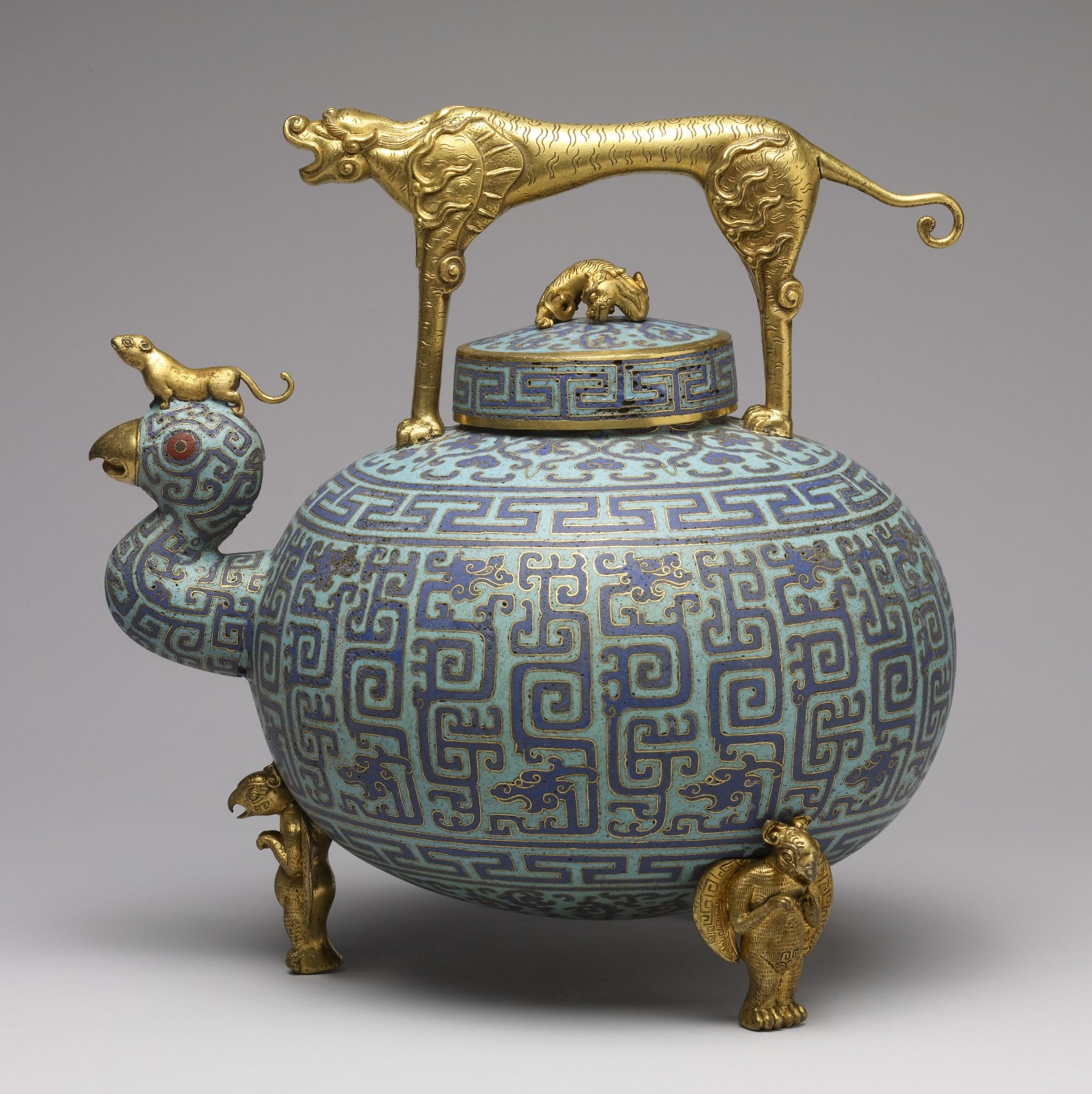
Chinese cloisonné enamel bronze wine pot, 18th century

From either Byzantium or the Islamic world, the cloisonné technique reached China in the 13–14th centuries. The first written reference to cloisonné is in a book from 1388, where it is called "Dashi ('Muslim') ware". No Chinese pieces that are clearly from the 14th century are known; the earliest datable pieces are from the reign of the Xuande Emperor (1425–1435), which, since they show a full use of Chinese styles, suggest considerable experience in the technique.

Cloisonné remained very popular in China until the 19th century and is still produced today. The most elaborate and most highly valued Chinese pieces are from the early Ming dynasty, especially the reigns of the Xuande Emperor and Jingtai Emperor (1450–1457), although 19th century or modern pieces are far more common.

=== Japan ===
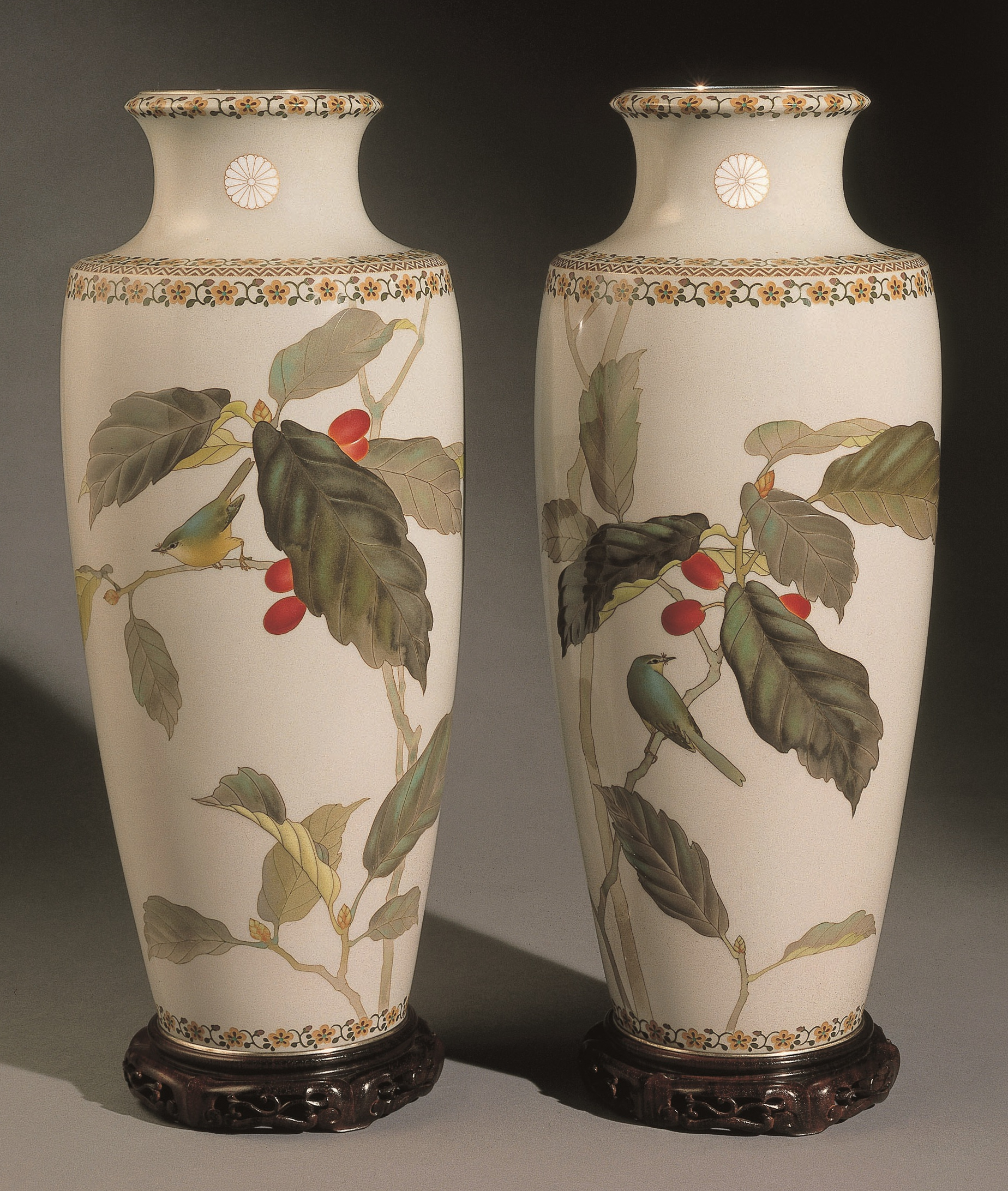
Imperial vases by Ando Jubei, with the chrysanthemum crests of the Imperial family, using moriage to slightly raise the design; Khalili Collection of Japanese Art

Japanese artists did not make three-dimensional enamelled objects until the 1830s but, once the technique took hold based on analysis of Chinese objects, it developed very rapidly, reaching a peak in the Meiji and Taishō eras (late 19th/early 20th century). Enamel had been used as decoration for metalwork since about 1600, and Japanese cloisonné was already exported to Europe before the start of the Meiji era in 1868. Cloisonné is known in Japan as shippo, literally "seven treasures". This refers to richly coloured substances mentioned in Buddhist texts. The term was initially used for colourful objects imported from China. According to legend, in the 1830s Kaji Tsunekichi broke open a Chinese enamel object to examine it, then trained many artists, starting off Japan's own enamel industry.

Early Japanese enamels were cloudy and opaque, with relatively clumsy shapes. This changed rapidly from 1870 onwards. The Nagoya cloisonné company (Nagoya shippo kaisha existed from 1871 to 1884, to sell the output of many small workshops and help them improve their work. In 1874, the government created the Kiriu kosho kaisha company to sponsor the creation of a wide range of decorative arts at international exhibitions. This was part of a programme to promote Japan as a modern, industrial nation.

Gottfried Wagener was a German scientist brought in by the government to advise Japanese industry and improve production processes. Along with Namikawa Yasuyuki he developed a transparent black enamel which was used for backgrounds. Translucent enamels in various other colours followed during this period. Along with Tsukamoto Kaisuke, Wagener transformed the firing processes used by Japanese workshops, improving the quality of finishes and extending the variety of colours. Kawade Shibatarō introduced a variety of techniques, including nagare-gusuri (drip-glaze) which produces a rainbow-coloured glaze and uchidashi (repoussé) technique, in which the metal foundation is hammered outwards to create a relief effect. Together with Hattori Tadasaburō he developed the moriage ("piling up") technique which places layers of enamel upon each other to create a three-dimensional effect. Namikawa Sōsuke developed a pictorial style that imitated paintings. He is known for shosen (minimised wires) and musen (wireless cloisonné): techniques developed with Wagener in which the wire cloisons are minimised or burned away completely with acid. This contrasts with the Chinese style which used thick metal cloisons. Ando Jubei introduced the shōtai-jippō (plique-à-jour) technique which burns away the metal substrate to leave translucent enamel, producing an effect resembling stained glass. The Ando Cloisonné Company which he co-founded is one of the few makers from this era still active. Distinctively Japanese designs, in which flowers, birds and insects were used as themes, became popular. Designs also increasingly used areas of blank space. With the greater subtlety these techniques allowed, Japanese enamels were regarded as unequalled in the world and won many awards at national and international exhibitions.

=== India and Islamic world ===
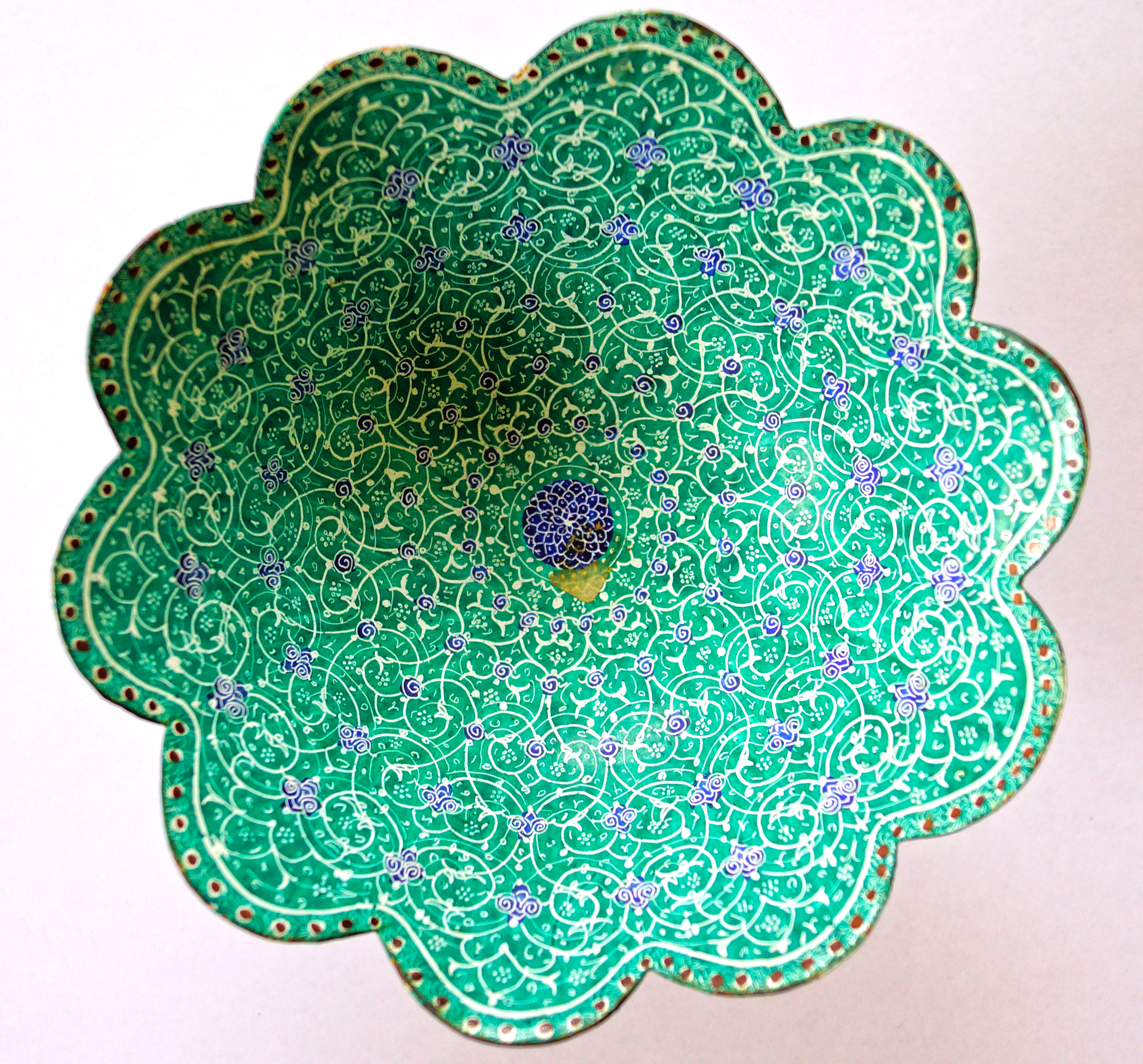
Meenakaari art from Iran

Enamel was established in the Mughal Empire by around 1600 for decorating gold and silver objects, and became a distinctive feature of Mughal jewellery. The Mughal court was known to employ mīnākār (enamelers). These craftsmen reached a peak of during the reign of Shah Jahan in the mid-17th century. Transparent enamels were popular during this time. Both cloissoné and champlevé were produced in Mughal, with champlevé used for the finest pieces. Modern industrial production began in Calcutta in 1921, with the Bengal Enamel Works Limited.

Enamel was used in Iran for colouring and ornamenting the surface of metals by fusing over it brilliant colours that are decorated in an intricate design called Meenakari. The French traveller Jean Chardin, who toured Iran during the Safavid period, made a reference to an enamel work of Isfahan, which comprised a pattern of birds and animals on a floral background in light blue, green, yellow and red. Gold has been used traditionally for Meenakari jewellery as it holds the enamel better, lasts longer and its lustre brings out the colours of the enamels. Silver, a later introduction, is used for artifacts like boxes, bowls, spoons, and art pieces. Copper began to be used for handicraft products after the Gold Control Act, was enforced in India which compelled the Meenakars to look for an alternative material. Initially, the work of Meenakari often went unnoticed as this art was traditionally used on the back of pieces of kundan or gem-studded jewellery, allowing pieces to be reversible.

=== Modern ===
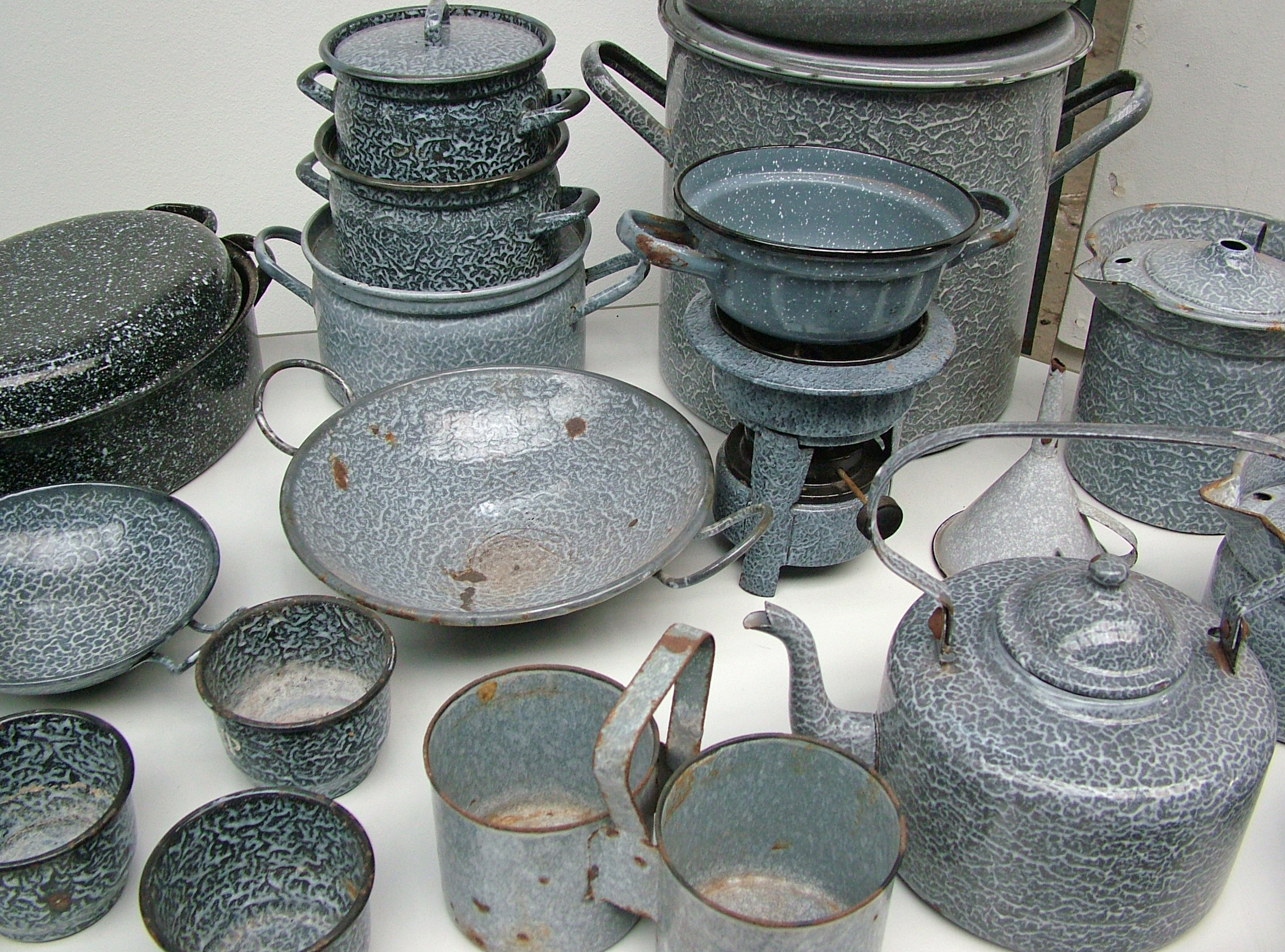
Grey clouds, typical enamel cooking gear from the Dutch DRU factory, popular in the 1950s

Enamelled cast iron Cookware and bakeware started to appear in Europe during the 1760s, a plant in Königsbronn, Germany, is noted as producing enamelled cast iron holloware in 1765, and experimental production was seen in Sweden, France, and Great Britain, by 1800. The technology would spread across western europe in the first half of the 19th century, and reach North America in the 1850s, with US enamel Cookware manufactures being established by the likes of The Vollrath Company, the Niedringhaus brothers, and Griswold Manufacturing.

More recently, the bright, jewel-like colours have made enamel popular with jewellery designers, including the Art Nouveau jewellers, for designers of bibelots such as the eggs of Peter Carl Fabergé and the enameled copper boxes of the Battersea enamellers, and for artists such as George Stubbs and other painters of portrait miniatures.

Enamelist Paul Hultberg was hailed as an innovator, producing large scale architectural murals using vitreous enamel on both copper and steel. Being too large to fit available kilns, he invented an open-air firing method for the individual copper panels that were incorporated into his completed works. In addition to the unusually large scale for the medium, Hultberg was also noted for his ingenuous use of fire scale, sgraffito, drawing lines with glycerin, and print-making techniques combined with brushing, "chance operations" and gestural abstraction.

Enamel was first applied commercially to sheet iron and steel in Austria and Germany in about 1850. Industrialization increased as the purity of raw materials increased and costs decreased. The wet application process started with the discovery of the use of clay to suspend frit in water. Developments that followed during the 20th century include enamelling-grade steel, cleaned-only surface preparation, automation, and ongoing improvements in efficiency, performance, and quality.

Between the World Wars, Cleveland in the United States became a center for enamel art, led by Kenneth F. Bates; H. Edward Winter who had taught at the Cleveland School of Art wrote three books on the topic including Enamel Art on Metals. In Australia, abstract artist Bernard Hesling brought the style into prominence with his variously sized steel plates, starting in 1957. A resurgence in enamel-based art took place near the end of the 20th century in the Soviet Union, led by artists like Alexei Maximov and Leonid Efros.

== Properties ==
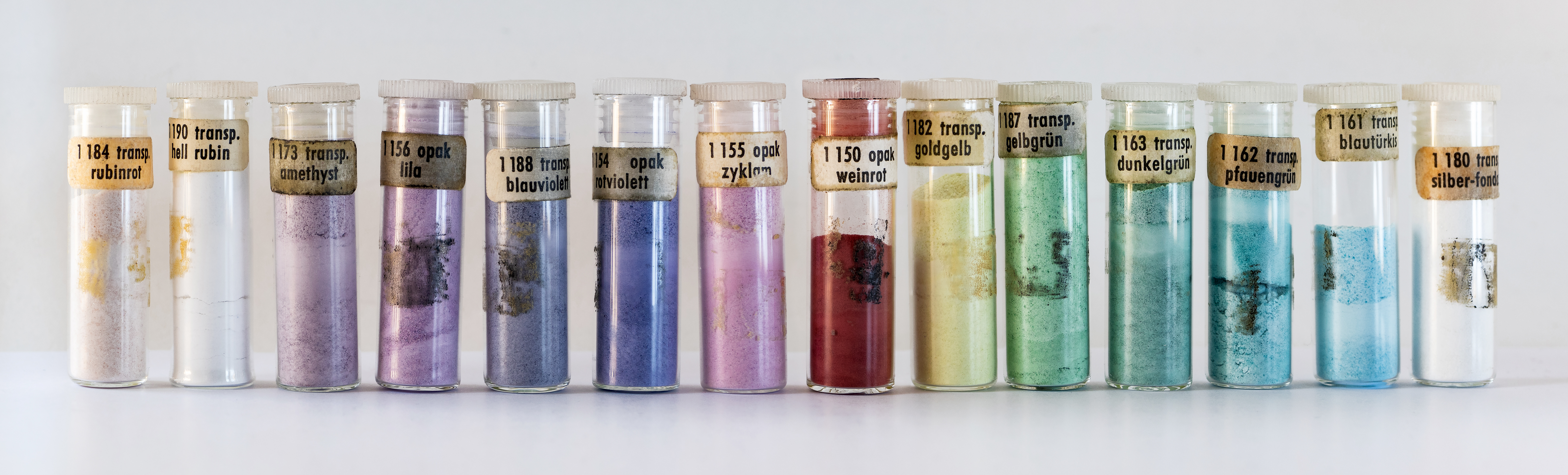
Glass vials with ground vitreous enamel powder in different colors

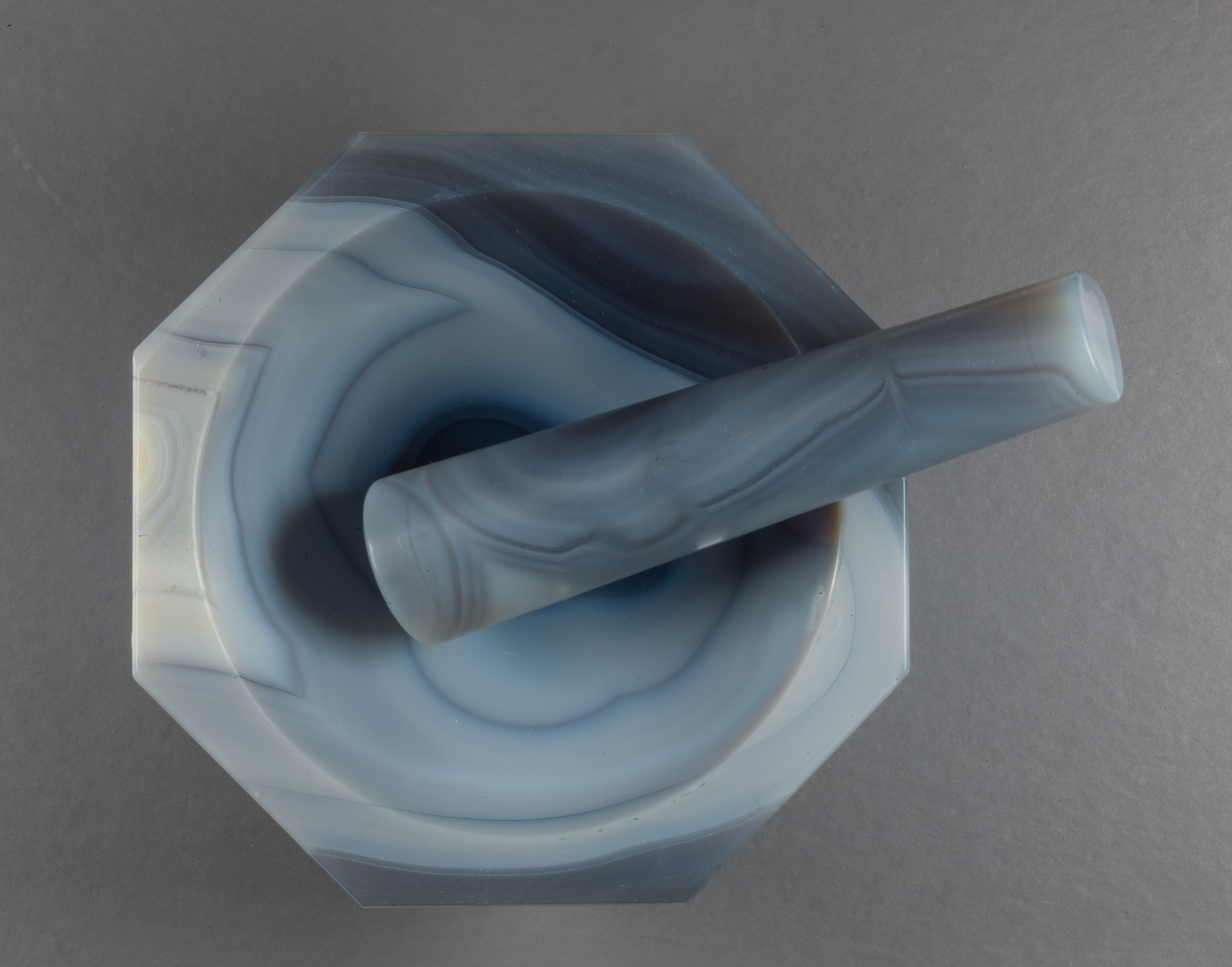
An agate mortar and pestle is used to finely grind vitreous enamel powder, mixed with a volatile oil, such as lavender oil, to produce enamel paints for artistic work.

Vitreous enamel can be applied to most metals. Most modern industrial enamel is applied to steel in which the carbon content is controlled to prevent unwanted reactions at the firing temperatures. Enamel can also be applied to gold, silver, copper, aluminium, stainless steel, and cast iron.

Vitreous enamel has many useful properties: it is smooth, hard, chemically resistant, durable, scratch resistant (5–6 on the Mohs scale), has long-lasting colour fastness, is easy to clean, and cannot burn. Enamel is glass, not paint, so it does not fade under ultraviolet light. A disadvantage of enamel is a tendency to crack or shatter when the substrate is stressed or bent, but modern enamels are relatively chip- and impact-resistant because of good thickness control and coefficients of thermal expansion well-matched to the metal.

The Buick automobile company was founded by David Dunbar Buick with wealth earned by his development of improved enamelling processes, c. 1887, for sheet steel and cast iron. Such enameled ferrous material had, and still has, many applications: early 20th century and some modern advertising signs, interior oven walls, cooking pots, housing and interior walls of major kitchen appliances, housing and drums of clothes washers and dryers, sinks and cast iron bathtubs, farm storage silos, and processing equipment such as chemical reactors and pharmaceutical process tanks. Structures such as filling stations, bus stations and Lustron Houses had walls, ceilings and structural elements made of enamelled steel.

One of the most widespread modern uses of enamel is in the production of quality chalk-boards and marker-boards (typically called 'blackboards' or 'whiteboards') where the resistance of enamel to wear and chemicals ensures that 'ghosting', or unerasable marks, do not occur, as happens with polymer boards. Since standard enamelling steel is magnetically attractive, it may also be used for magnet boards. Some new developments in the last ten years include enamel/non-stick hybrid coatings, sol-gel functional top-coats for enamels, enamels with a metallic appearance, and easy-to-clean enamels.

The key ingredient of vitreous enamel is finely ground glass called frit. Frit for enamelling steel is typically an alkali borosilicate glass with a thermal expansion and glass temperature suitable for coating steel. Raw materials are smelted together between 2,100 and 2,650 °F (1,150 and 1,450 °C) into a liquid glass that is directed out of the furnace and thermal shocked with either water or steel rollers into frit.

Colour in enamel is obtained by the addition of various minerals, often metal oxides cobalt, praseodymium, iron, or neodymium. The latter creates delicate shades ranging from pure violet through wine-red and warm grey. Enamel can be transparent, opaque or opalescent (translucent). Different enamel colours can be mixed to make a new colour, in the manner of paint.

There are various types of frit, which may be applied in sequence. A ground coat is applied first; it usually contains smelted-in transition metal oxides such as cobalt, nickel, copper, manganese, and iron that facilitate adhesion to the metal. Next, clear and semi-opaque frits that contain material for producing colours are applied.

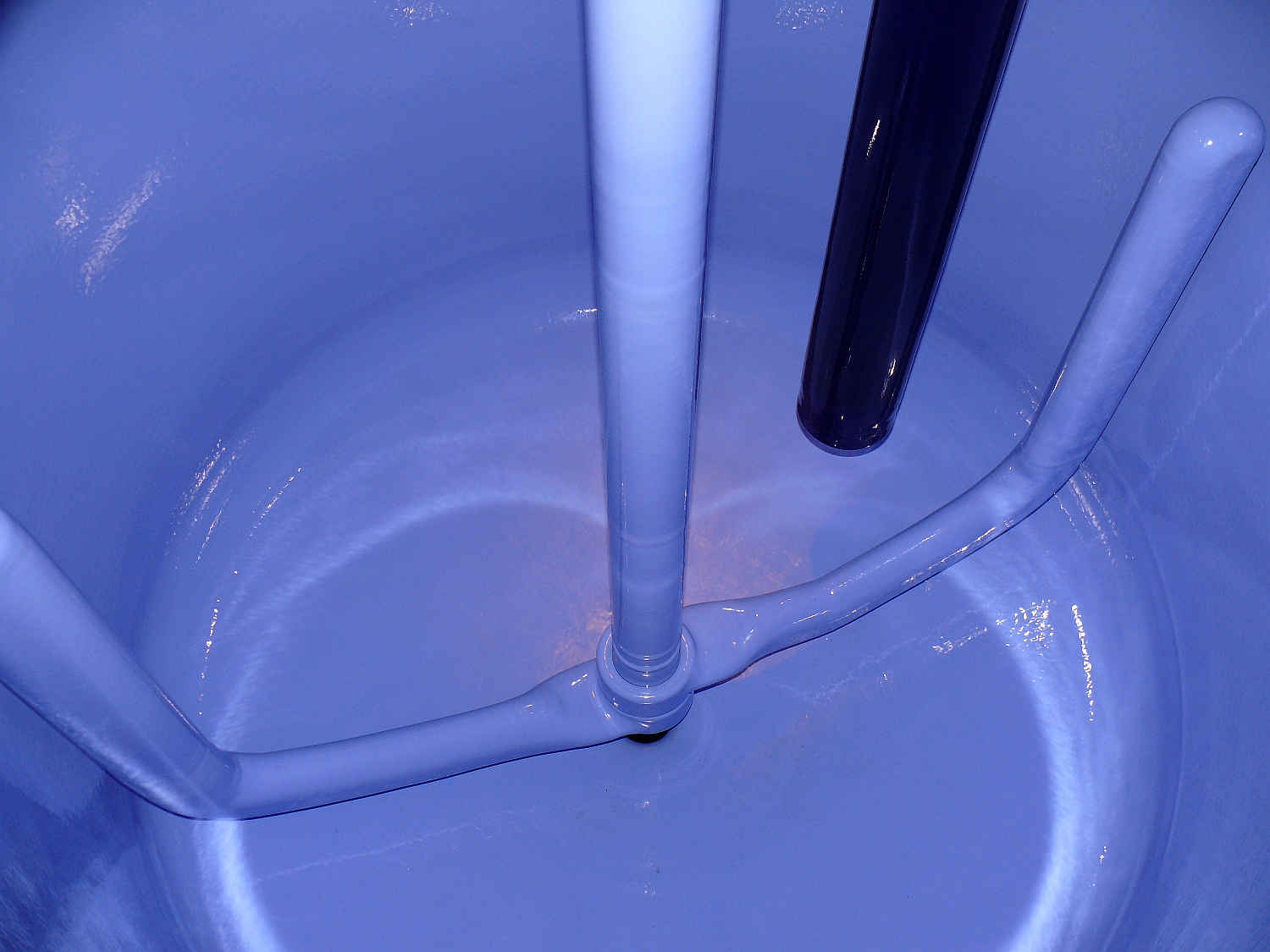
View into a glass-lined chemical reactor

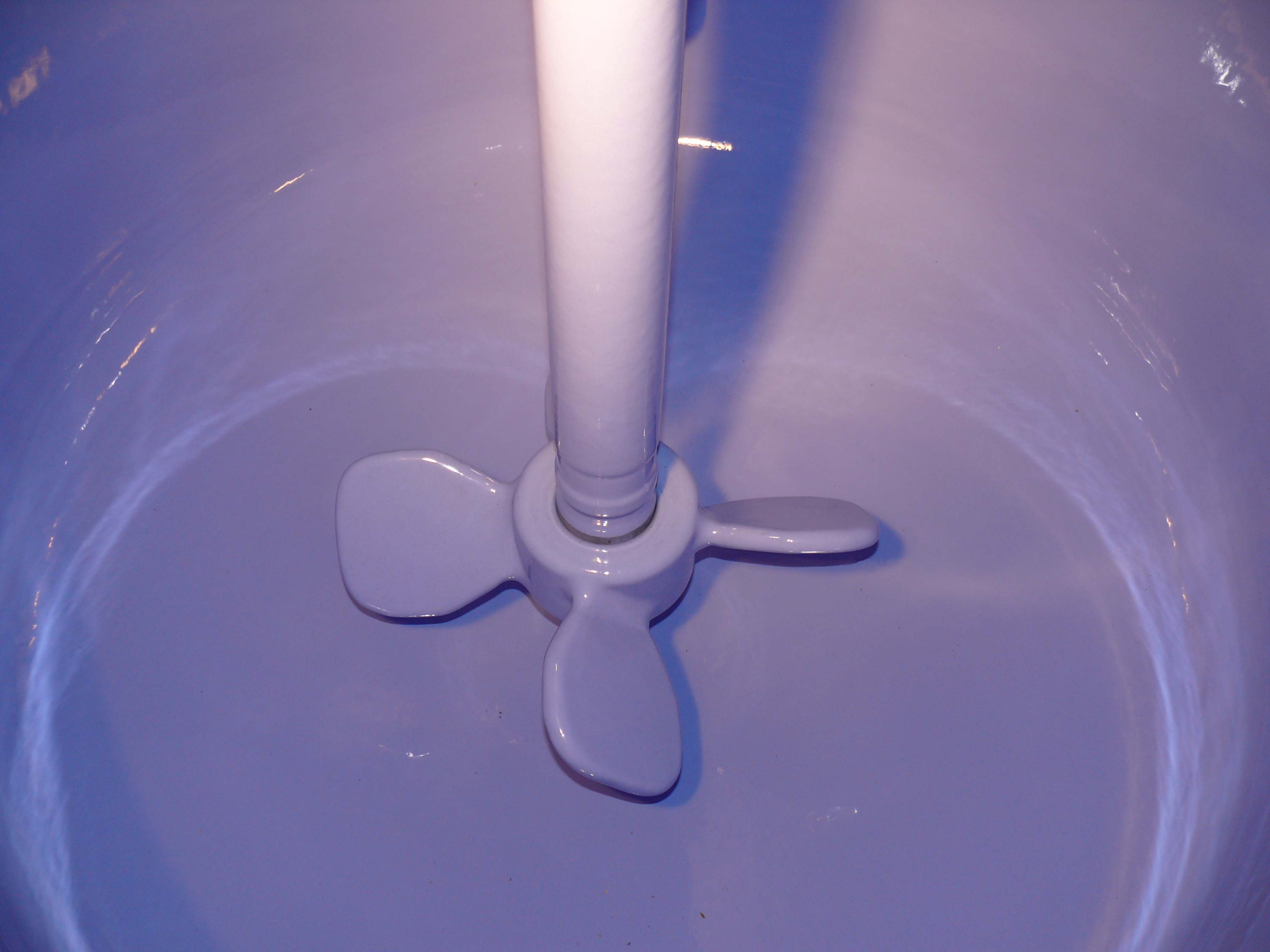
Turb-mixer in a glass-lined chemical reactor

== Techniques of artistic enameling ==
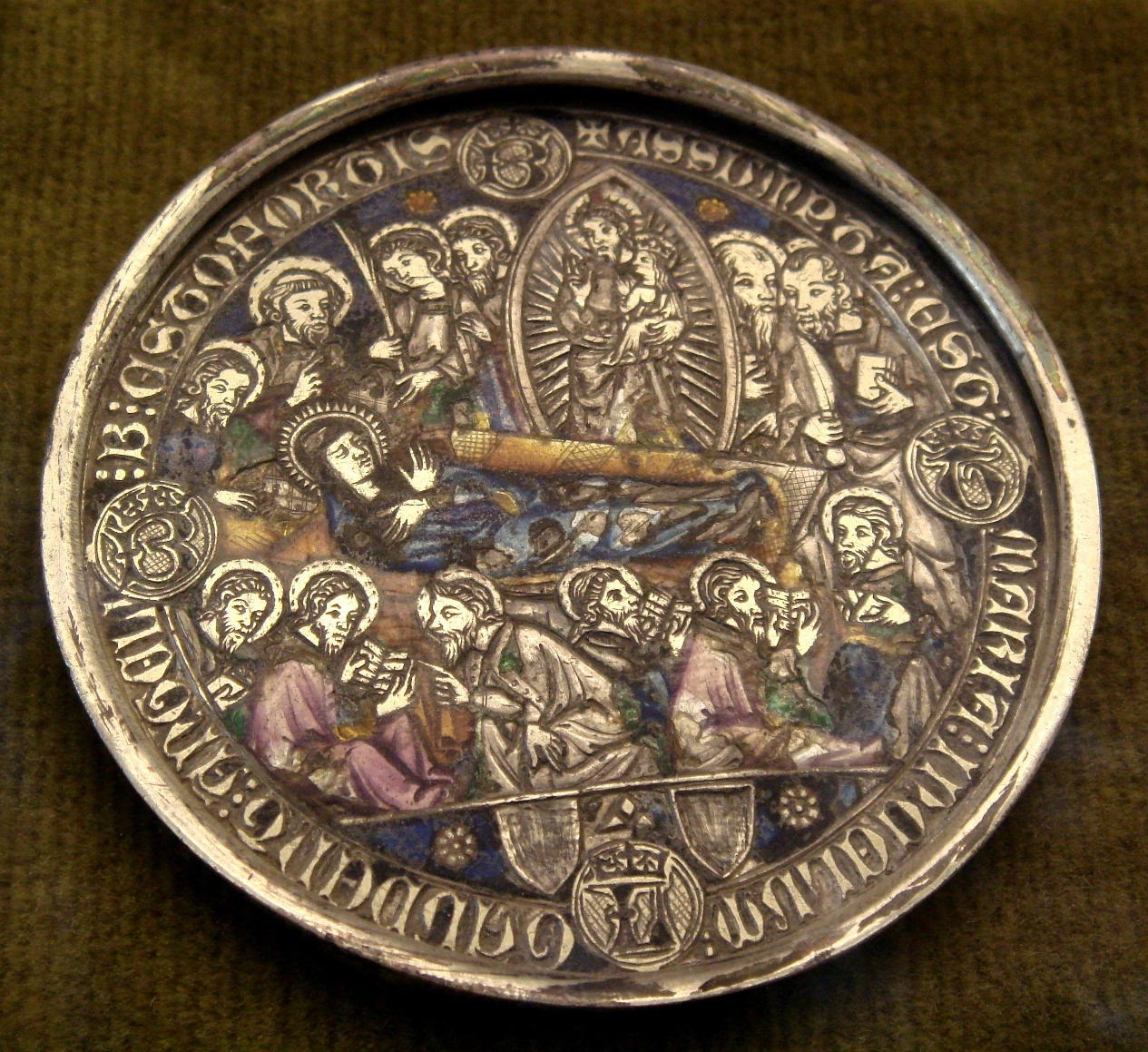
Medallion of the Death of the Virgin, with basse-taille enamel, partly fallen away

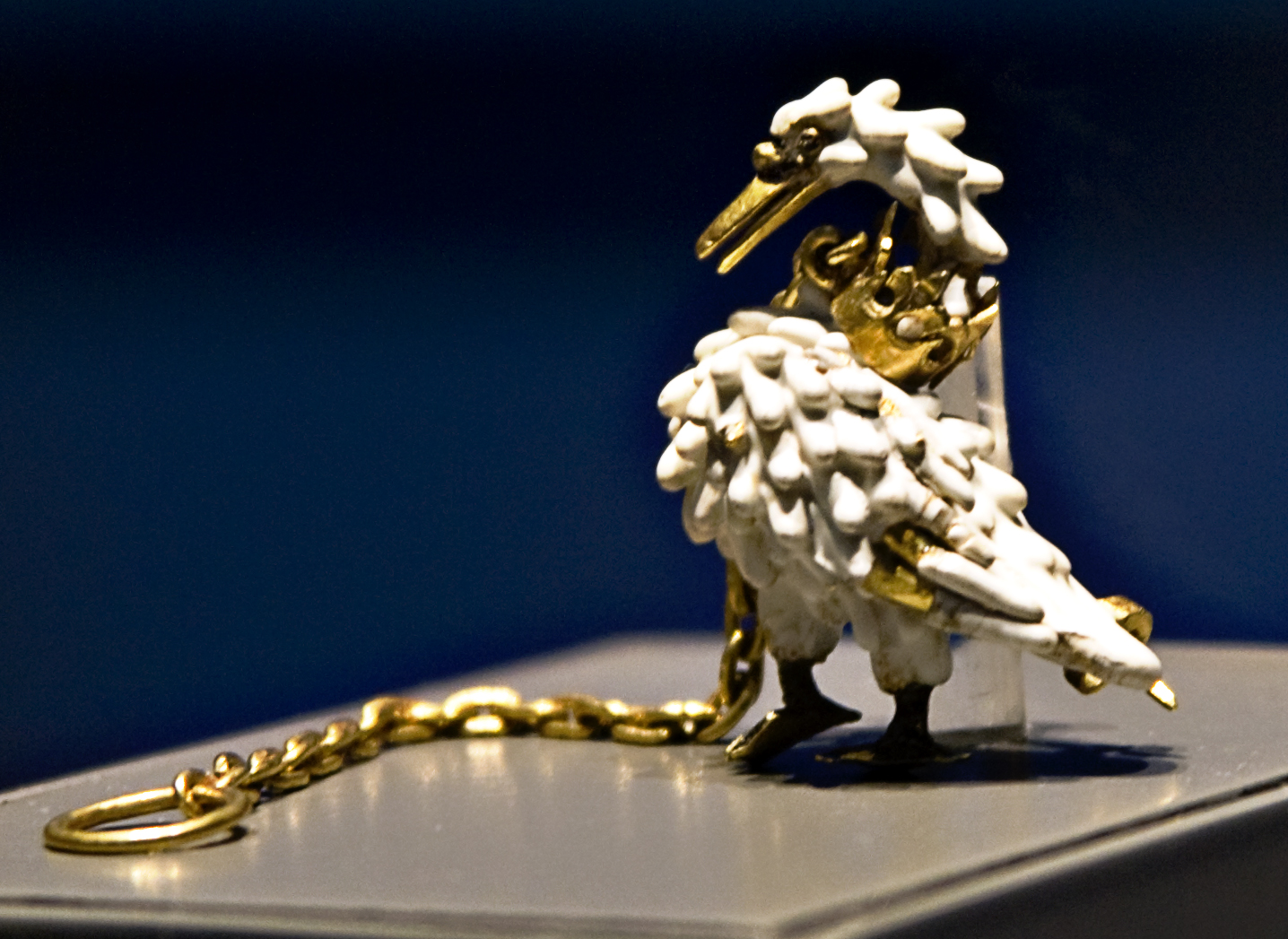
The Dunstable Swan Jewel, a livery badge in ronde bosse enamel, about 1400. British Museum

The three main historical techniques for enamelling metal are:

- Cloisonné, French for "cell", where thin wires are applied to form raised barriers, which contain different areas of (subsequently applied) enamel. Widely practiced in Europe, the Middle East and East Asia.
- Champlevé, French for "raised field", where the surface is carved out to form pits in which enamel is fired, leaving the original metal exposed; the Romanesque Stavelot Triptych is an example.
- Painted enamel, a design in enamel is painted onto a smooth metal surface. Limoges enamel is the best known type of painted enamel, using this from the 16th century onwards. Most traditional painting on glass, and some on ceramics, uses what is technically enamel, but is often described by terms such as "painted in enamels", reserving "painted enamel" and "enamel" as a term for the whole object for works with a metal base.

Variants, and less common techniques are:

- Basse-taille, from the French word meaning "low-cut". The surface of the metal is decorated with a low relief design which can be seen through translucent and transparent enamels. The 14th century Royal Gold Cup is an outstanding example.
- Plique-à-jour, French for "open to daylight" where the enamel is applied in cells, similar to cloisonné, but with no backing, so light can shine through the transparent or translucent enamel. It has a stained-glass like appearance; the Mérode Cup is the surviving medieval example.
- Ronde bosse, French for "in the round", also known as "encrusted enamel". A 3D type of enamelling where a sculptural form or wire framework is completely or partly enamelled, as in the 15th century Holy Thorn Reliquary.
- Grisaille, version of painted enamel, French term meaning "in grey", where a dark, often blue or black background is applied, then a palescent (translucent) enamel is painted on top, building up designs in a monochrome gradient, paler as the thickness of the layer of light colour increases.
- En résille (Émail en résille sur verre, French for 'enamel in a network on glass') where enamelled metal is suspended in glass. The technique was briefly popular in seventeenth-century France and was re-discovered by Margret Craver in 1953. Craver spent 13 years re-creating the technique.

Other types:

- Enamelled glass, in which a glass surface is enamelled, and fired to fuse the glasses.
- Stenciling, where a stencil is placed over the work and the powdered enamel is sifted over the top. The stencil is removed before firing, the enamel staying in a pattern, slightly raised.
- Sgraffito, where an unfired layer of enamel is applied over a previously fired layer of enamel of a contrasting colour, and then partly removed with a tool to create the design.
- Serigraph, where a silkscreen is used with 60–70in grade mesh.
- Surrey enamel, a 17th-century type for brass objects such as candlesticks; effectively champlevé.
- Counter-enamelling, not strictly a technique, but a necessary step in many techniques, especially painted enamel on thin plaques; introduced in 15th-century Europe. Enamel is applied to the back of a piece as well – sandwiching the metal – to equalize the rates of expansion under heat, and so create less tension on the glass so it does not crack.
- Safed chalwan, where jewels are set in white enamel

See also Japanese shipōyaki techniques.

== Industrial enamel application ==
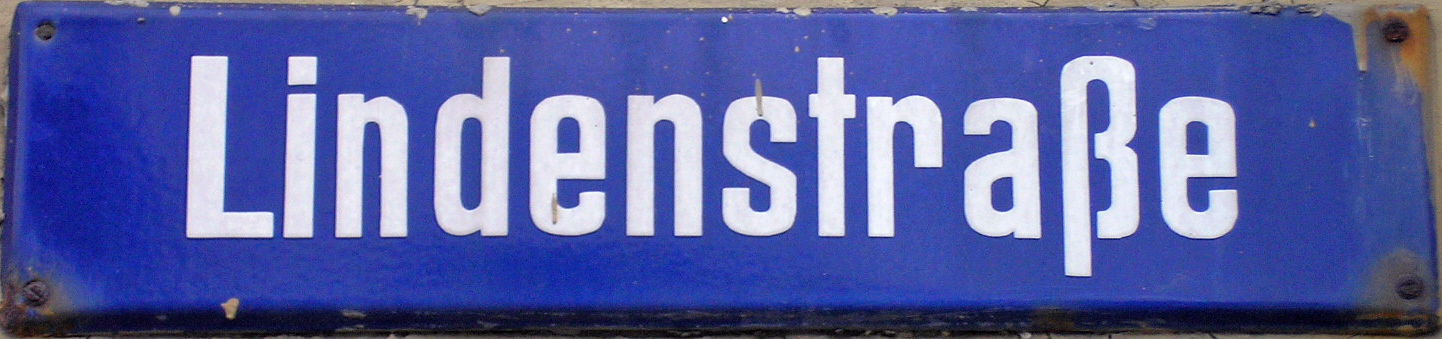
Old German enamel street sign

On sheet steel, a ground coat layer is applied to create adhesion. The only surface preparation required for modern ground coats is degreasing of the steel with a mildly alkaline solution. White and coloured second "cover" coats of enamel are applied over the fired ground coat. For electrostatic enamels, the coloured enamel powder can be applied directly over a thin unfired ground coat "base coat" layer that is co-fired with the cover coat in a very efficient two-coat/one-fire process.

The frit in the ground coat contains smelted-in cobalt and/or nickel oxide as well as other transition metal oxides to catalyse the enamel-steel bonding reactions. During firing of the enamel at between 760 and 895 °C (1,400 and 1,643 °F), iron oxide scale first forms on the steel. The molten enamel dissolves the iron oxide and precipitates cobalt and nickel. The iron acts as the anode in an electrogalvanic reaction in which the iron is again oxidised, dissolved by the glass, and oxidised again with the available cobalt and nickel limiting the reaction. Finally, the surface becomes roughened with the glass anchored into the holes.

== Building cladding ==
Enamel coatings applied to steel panels offer protection to the core material whether cladding road tunnels, underground stations, building superstructures or other applications. It can also be specified as a curtain walling. Qualities of this structural material include:

- Durable
- Withstands extreme temperatures and is non-flammable
- Long lasting UV, climate and corrosion resistance
- Dirt-repellent and graffiti-proof
- Resistant to abrasion and chemicals
- Easy cleaning and maintenance

== Gallery ==
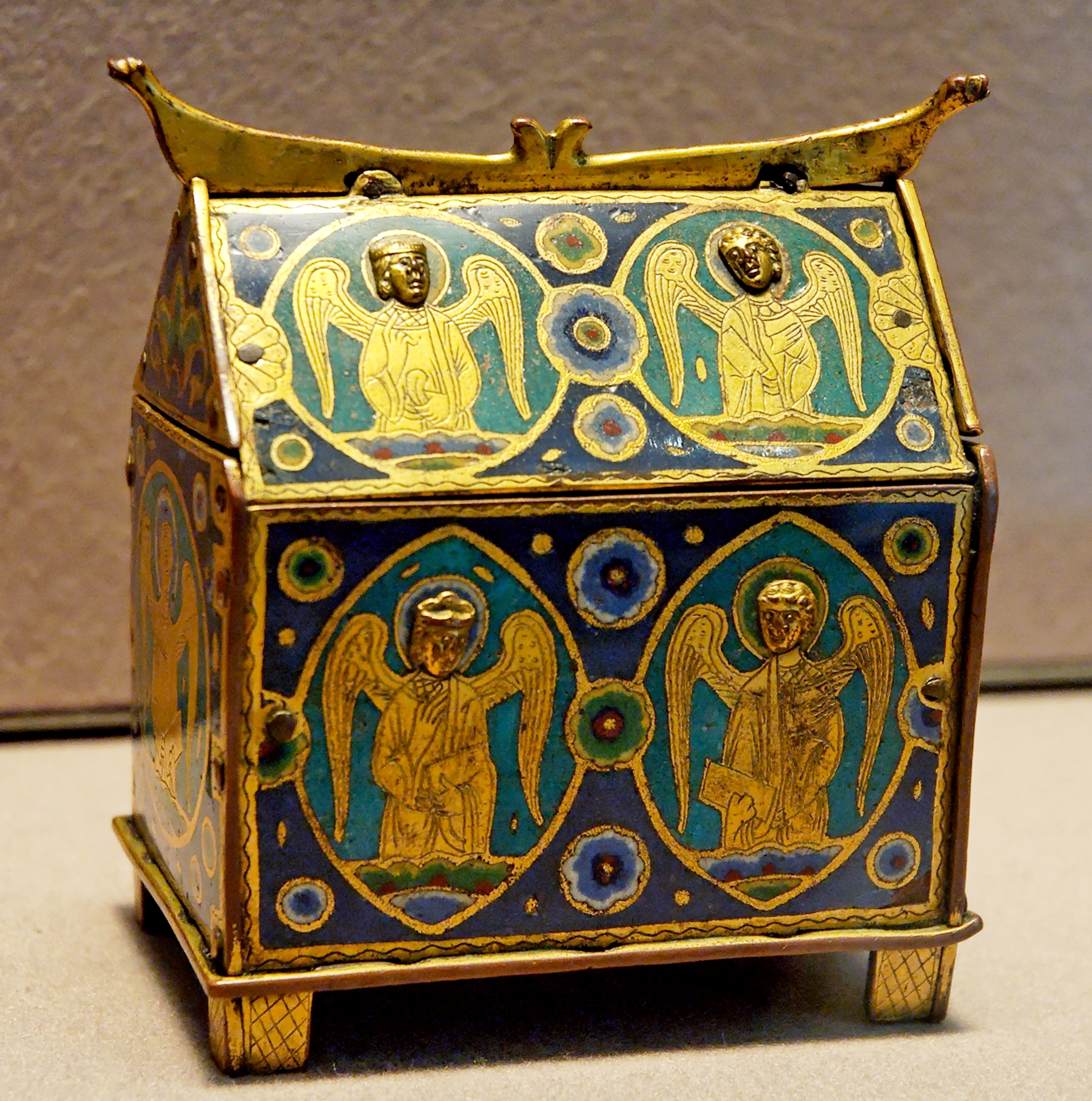
Early 13th century Limoges chasse used to hold holy oils; most were reliquaries.

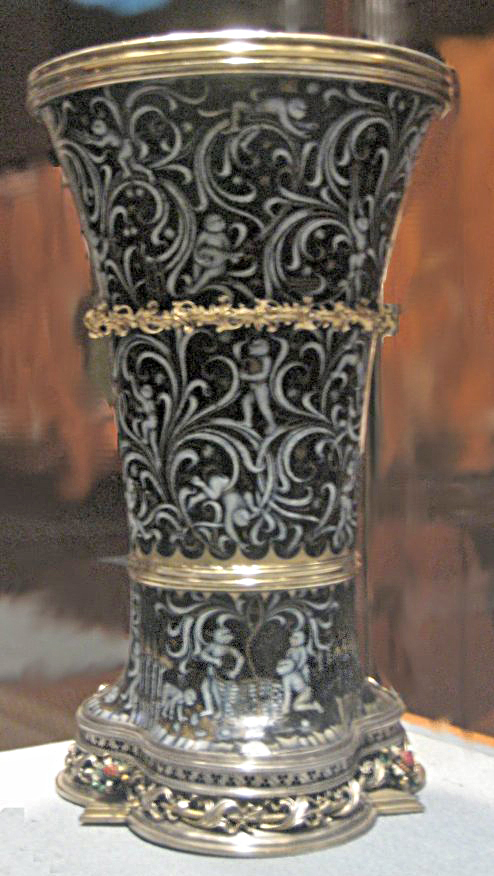
Silver, silver gilt and painted enamel beaker, Burgundian Netherlands, c. 1425–1450, The Cloisters, nyc

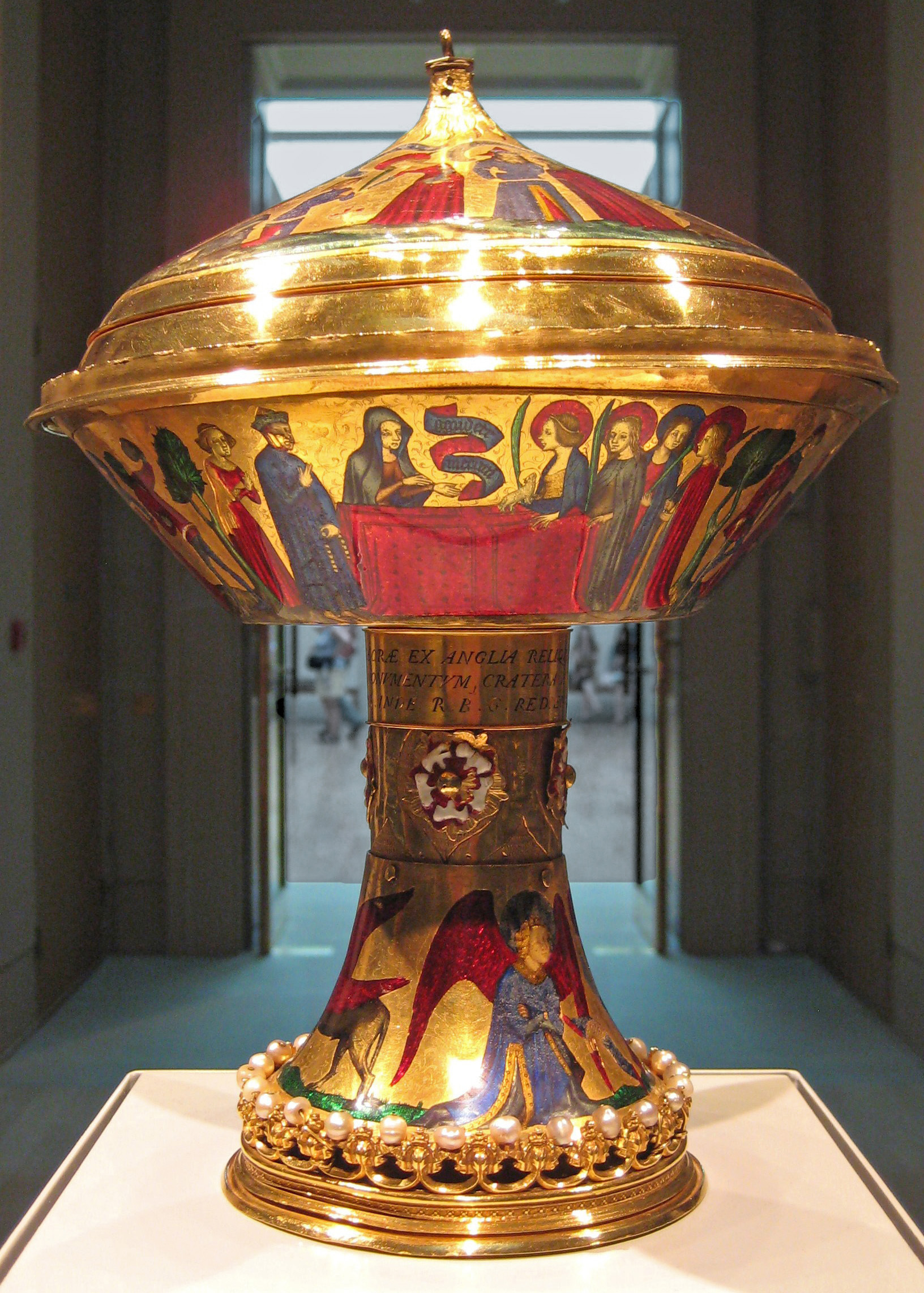
The Royal Gold Cup with basse-taille enamels; weight 1.935 kg, British Museum. Saint Agnes appears to her friends in a vision.

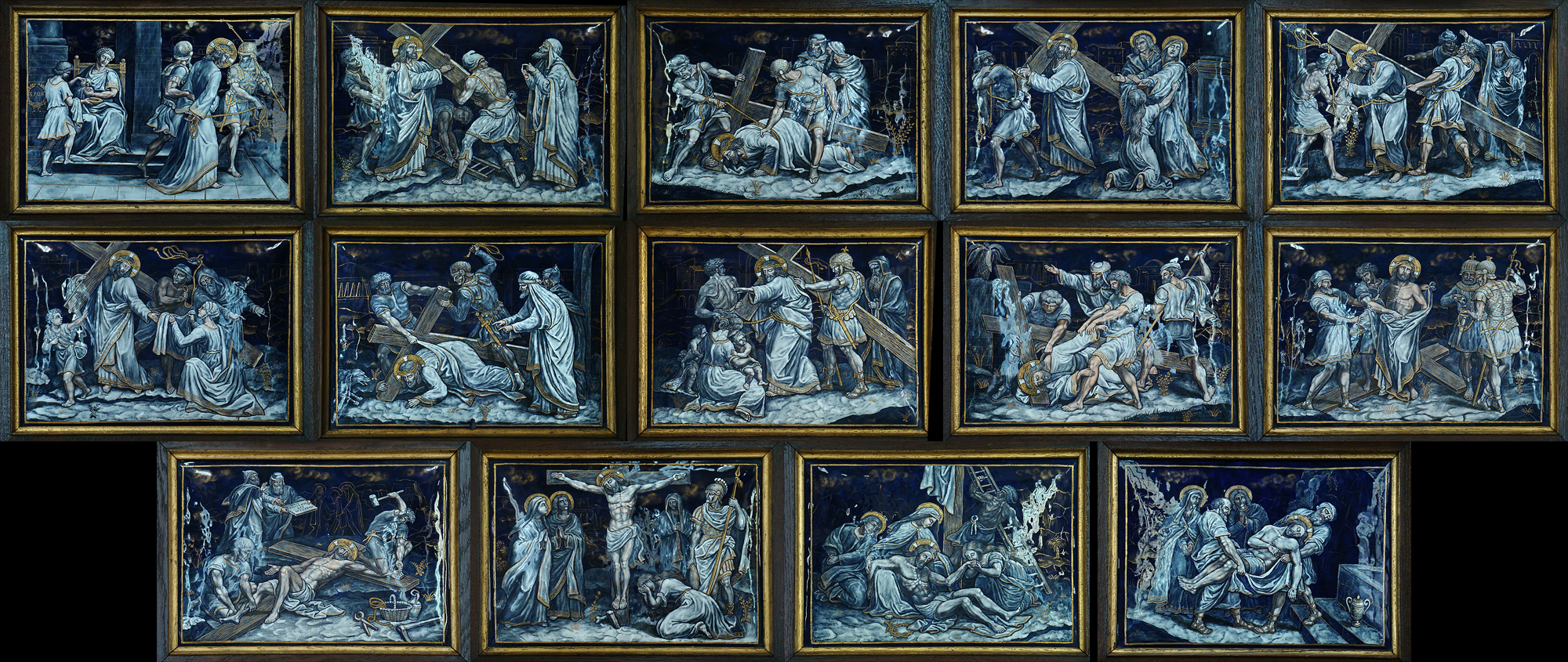
Limoges? grisaille painted Stations of the Cross, Notre-Dame-des-Champs, Avranches

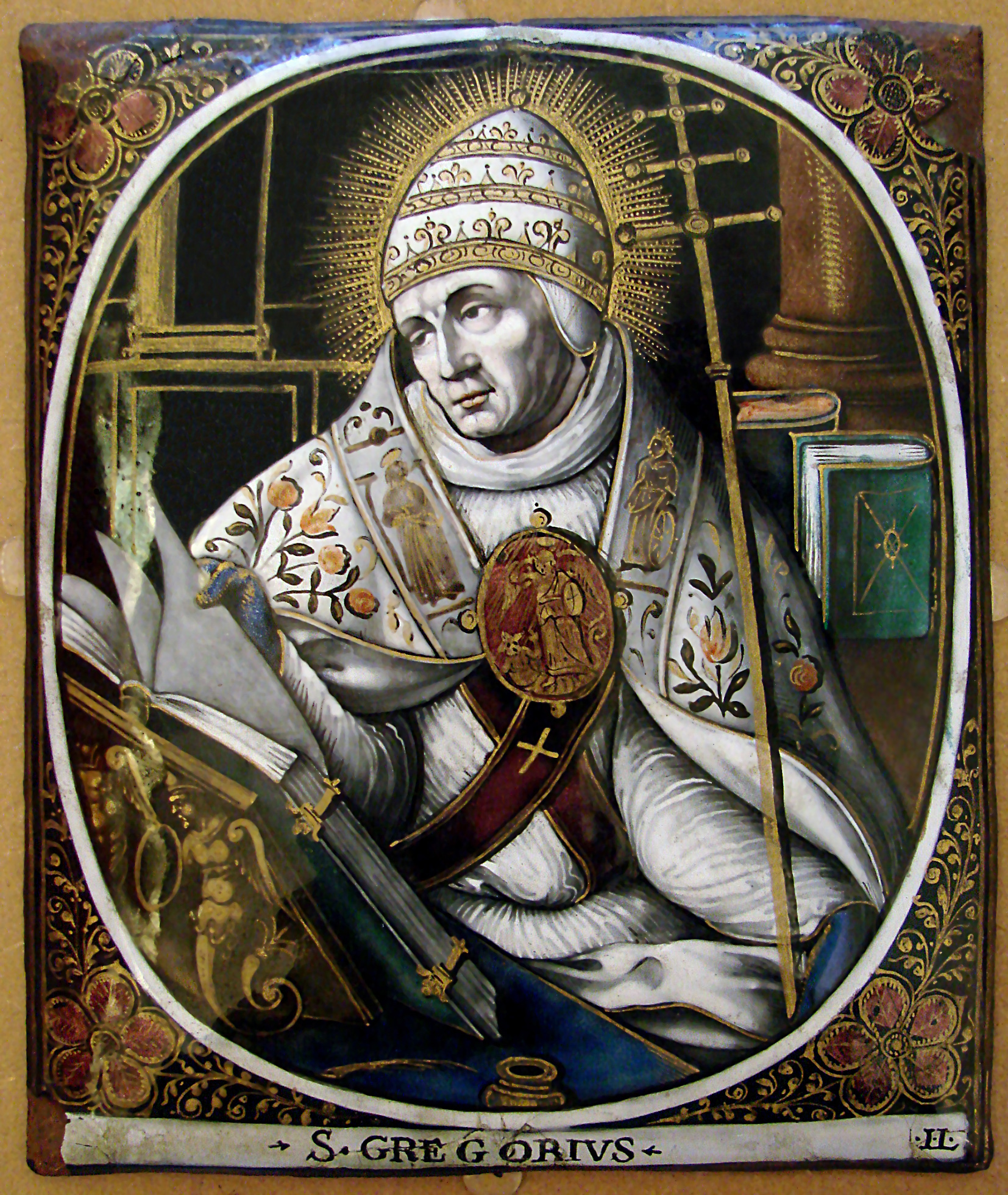
St. Gregory the Great in painted Limoges enamel on a copper plaque, by Jacques I Laudin

A freehand enameled painting by Einar Hakonarson. In the forest, 1989

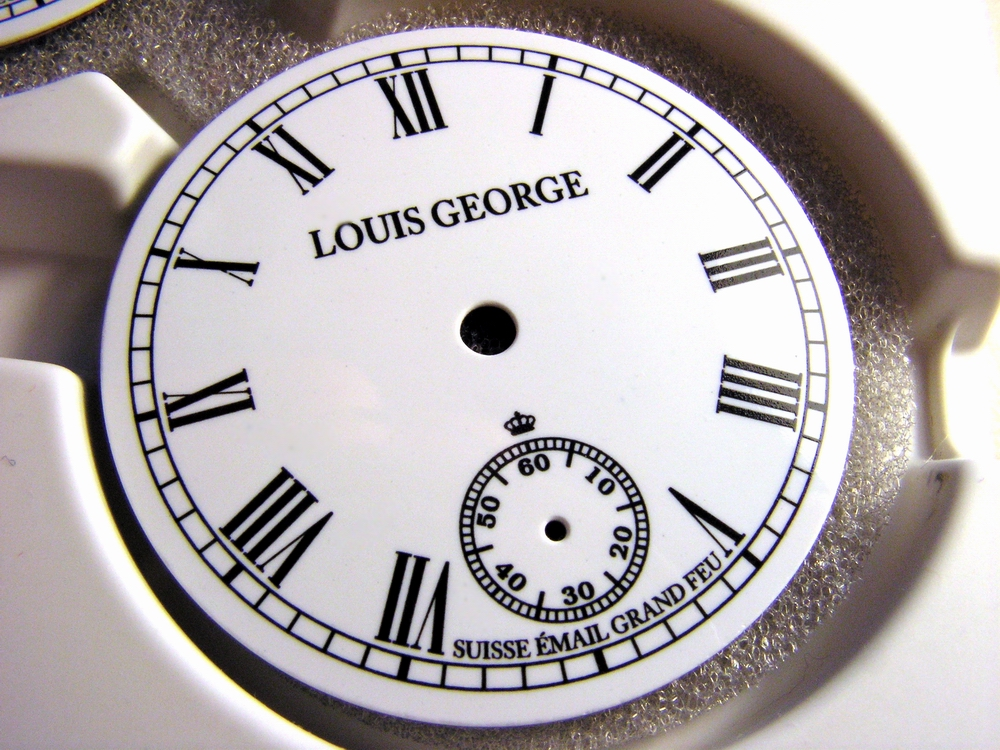
Louis George enamel watch dial

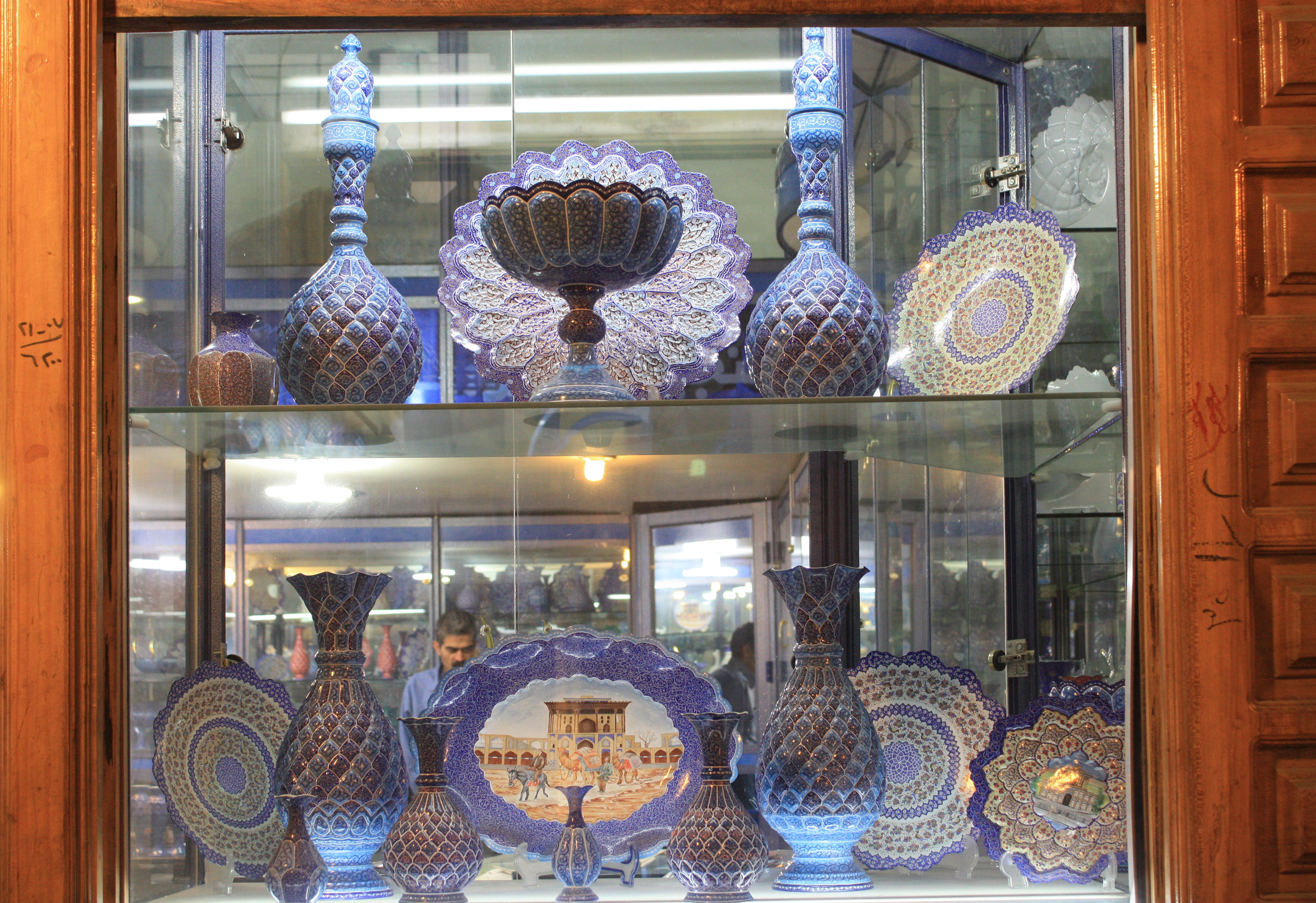
Iranian enamel

== See also ==
- Fred Uhl Ball (1945–1985) – American enamellist who created the largest known enamel mural
- Oskar Schindler
- Rostov in Russia, with Moscow a centre of the Russian industry
