= Efros =

Efros is a surname. Notable people with the name include:

- Alexei A. Efros, American computer scientist
- Alexei L. Efros, American physicist
- Anatoly Efros, Russian and Soviet theatre producer
- Cristian Efros, Moldavian footballer
- Leonid Efros, Russian painter

== See also ==
- Mirele Efros, an 1898 Yiddish play by Jacob Gordin
