= Leonid Efros =

Russian oil painter and enamellist

Leonid Efros (Леонид Эфрос) is a Russian oil painter and enamellist. His work includes drawings and paintings of European royalty, including Britain's Queen Elizabeth II, the Queen Mother, Princess Anne and Princess Michael of Kent. He drew the Queen during a two-hour sitting in March 1992 alongside long-time collaborator Alexei Maximov.

His drawings formed the basis of an exhibition of enamels at the Kremlin Armoury in 1994. Examples of his work are held in the Kremlin's permanent collection as well as other important Russian galleries. His work has been exhibited at the Moscow City Museum and the F.M. Dostoevsky Literary and Memorial Museum in Leningrad (St. Petersburg).
