= Alexei Maximov =

Russian oil painter (born 1952)

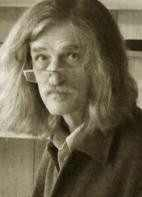
Alexei Maximov

Alexei Maximov (born 1952) is a Soviet-born oil painter, enamellist and portrait painter of European royals. He is known as a painter on canvas and enamel and a graphic artist, working in the genres of portraiture, landscape and still life. Alexei Maximov's works are in many art museums in Russia and abroad. In 1987, he became a member of the Union of Artists of Russia; in total, his works have been presented at more than 100 art exhibitions around the world. Larisa Peshekhonova of the State Museums of the Moscow Kremlin described Maximov as an artist who "transformed the traditions of the past to create [his] own unique artistic style and world images."

== Career ==
In his work Maximov has used traditional methods of enamel art production, without contemporary digital set ovens. During the late 20th-century, Maximov led a resurgence of enamel-based art in Russia. The first exhibition of Maximov's work occurred at the Podolsk Town Museum in 1979, and the second was held in 1979 at the State Literature Museum in Moscow. Another exhibition Maximov's work took place at the Kremlin Armoury. In 2012 an exhibition of his work was held in the William Kent House in London, showing his enamel miniature portraits of members of the royal families of the UK, the Netherlands, and Norway. This included the twentieth anniversary of his portrait of Queen Elizabeth II as well as her Diamond Jubilee.

Following the exhibition of the works, which can only be seen by appointment, they were put up for auction. Queen Elizabeth II recommended that Princess Anne sit for Maximov the following week, and Queen Elizabeth, The Queen Mother later that month. His work has been a part of around one hundred art exhibitions.

== Gallery ==
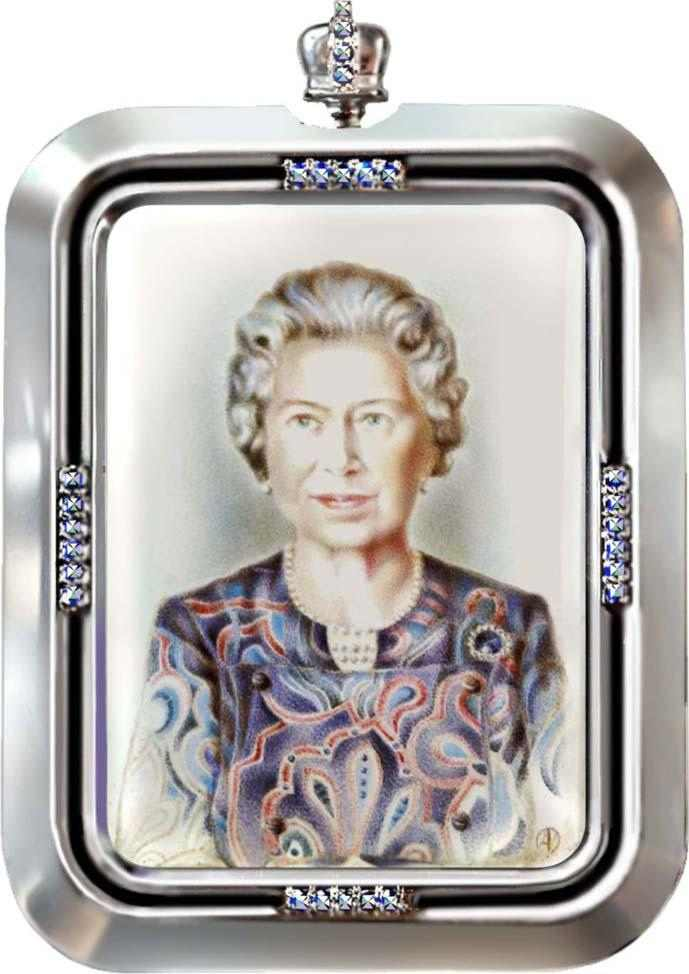
Queen Elizabeth II

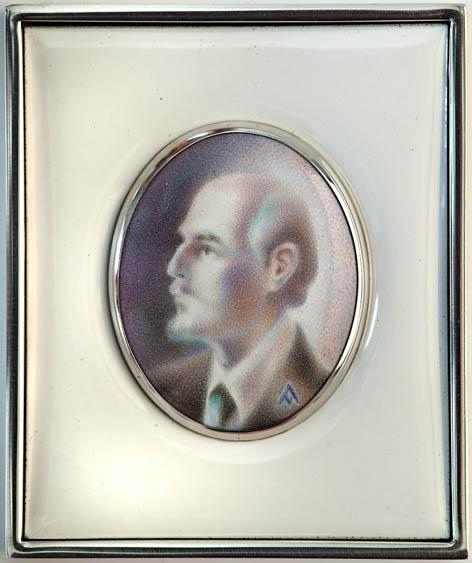

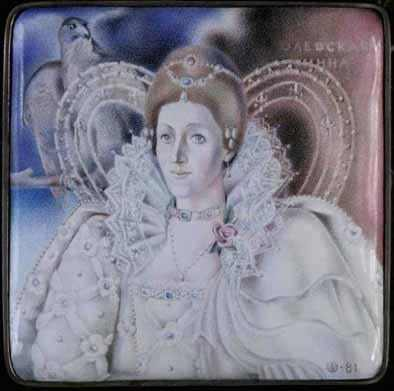

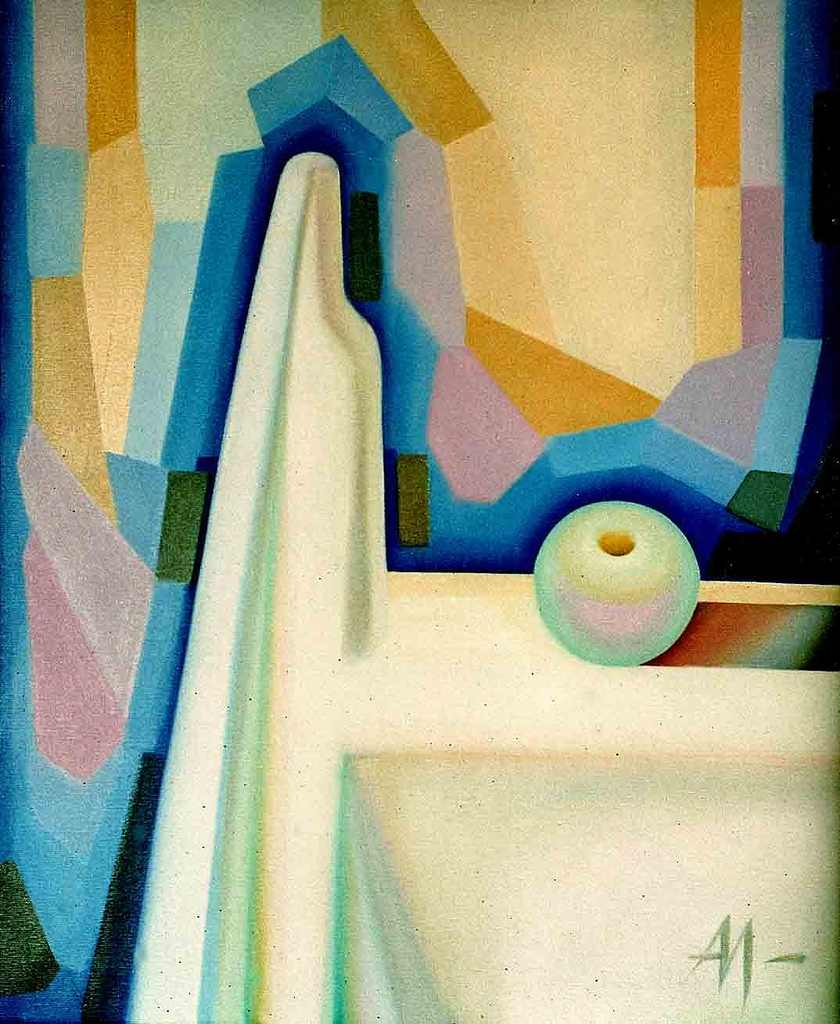

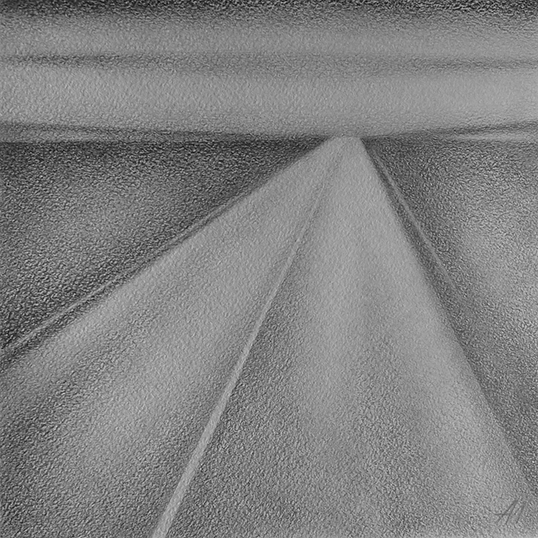

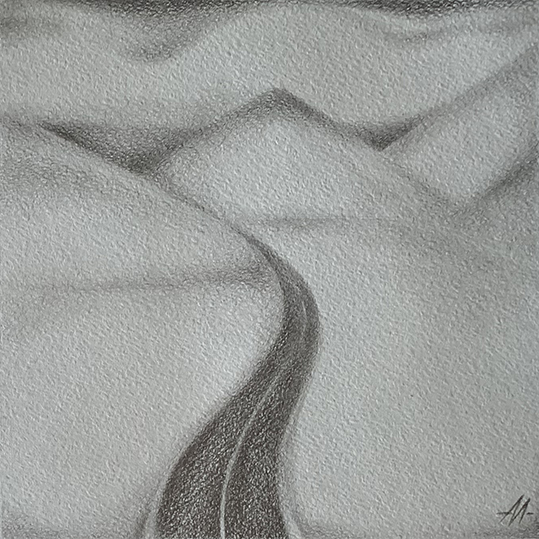

== Museums ==
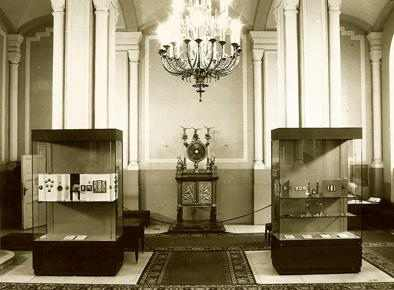
Exhibition at the armory of the museums of the Moscow Kremlin

Maximov's works are presented in the collections of museums:

- Moscow Kremlin Museums. Moscow
- The State Hermitage Museum, St Petersburg
- State Historical Museum. Moscow
- State Museum of the History of St. Petersburg. St. Petersburg
- State Literary Museum. Moscow
- Literature Museum of Dostoyevsky, St Petersburg
- The Museum & Nature Reserve «Tsaritsyno». Moscow
- All-Russian Museum of Decorative and Applied Arts. Moscow
- Enamel Museum Limoges. France
- Collection of Queen Elizabeth II, London

== Personal life ==
Maximov spent his childhood and youth in the Moscow region village of Aleksandrovka. In 1980, he moved from Moscow to Leningrad (Saint Petersburg).From 1989 to 2000 he lived in Witten (Germany) and Amsterdam (Netherlands). He currently lives in Saint Petersburg, Russia.

== Awards ==
In 1982 Maximov was awarded the International Award for Remarkable Artistic Achievement on the III Quadriennale of Applied Arts in Erfurt, Germany.

In 1988 he was awarded the Grand Prix of the Leningrad Committee of The Union of Russian Artists. That same year, the miniature "Vernissage", after receiving the purchase prize, was placed in the exposition of the Enamel Museum in Limoges (France).
