= En résille =

Émail en résille sur verre ("enamel in a network on glass") is a rare and difficult enameling technique first practiced for a brief period in seventeenth-century France. It was later revived by American metalsmith Margret Craver, who encountered the technique in 1953 and spent 13 years re-creating and perfecting it.

== Method ==
The technique involves etching a design in a piece of glass, which is then lined with gold foil and the hollow filled with powdered enamel. It is difficult to accomplish in part because of the extremely careful regulation of temperature required to fuse the enamel without damaging the glass in which it is embedded. The edges of the foil form a frame for the enamel, giving the appearance, as artist William Claude Harper described it, of "the most delicate cloisonné that you can imagine".

== 1950s rediscovery ==
In 1953, metalsmith Margret Craver saw a pin decorated using the technique. Craver began studying the technique, researching and testing it over the course of about thirteen years to reproduce it. Because the technique was not being practiced, and there were no instructional texts in existence, the work was slow, and Craver had to design her own tools. On the technique, Craver said "it took forever, because this was such an ancient technique and no one knew a darn thing about it. I just had to start out and do it myself."

== See also ==
- Creativity techniques
- List of art techniques
