= Sarpech =

Turban ornament

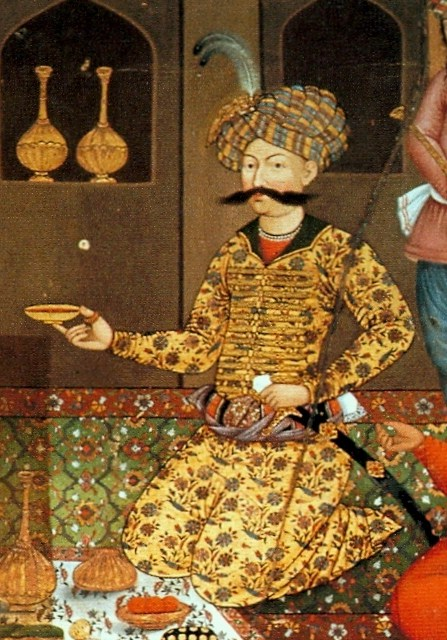
Shah Abbas I of Safavid Persia

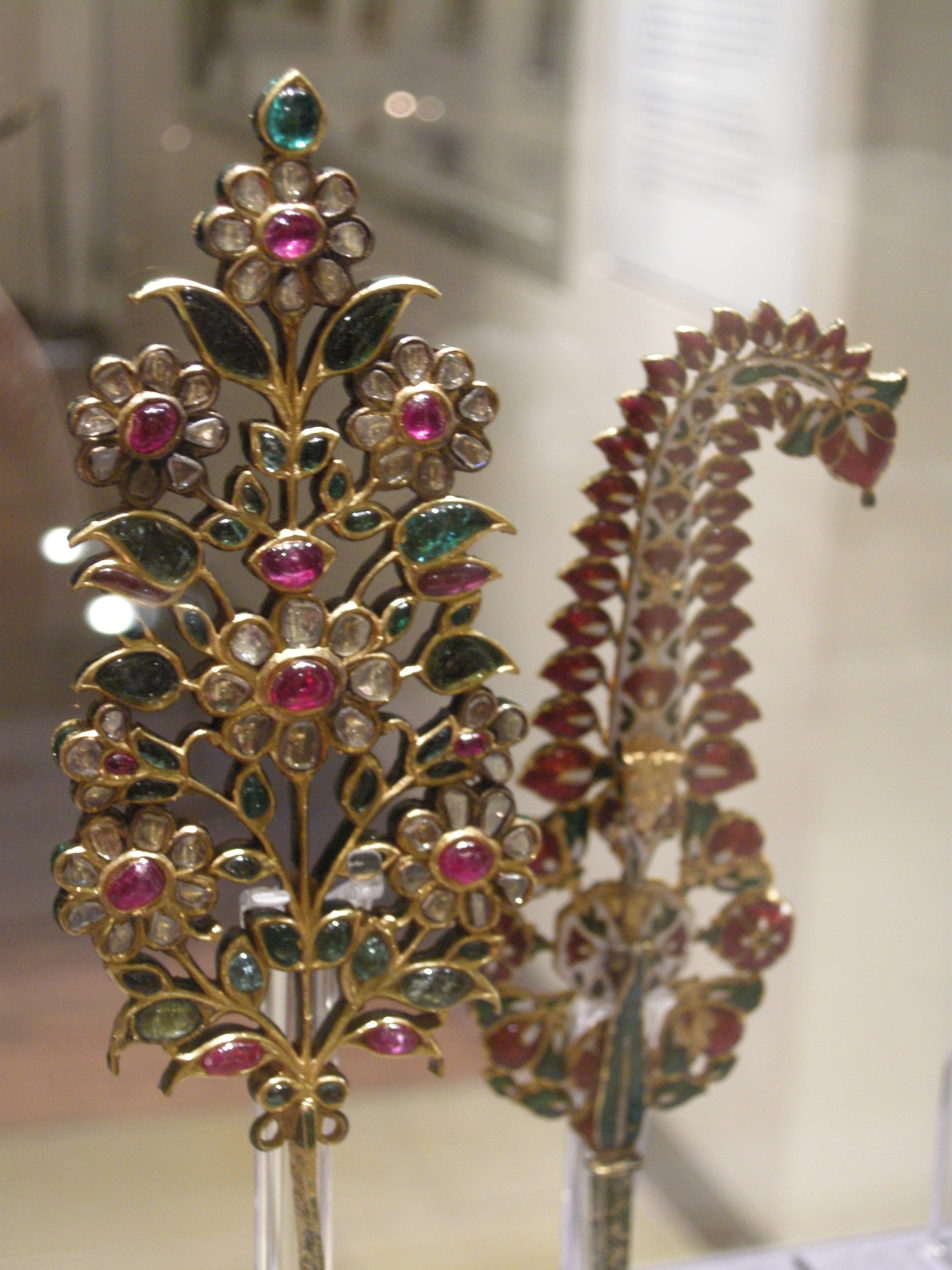
Sarpech (Turban ornament) with Safed chalwan back

The sarpech (Urdu: سرپیچ/Hindi: सरपेच, from Persian), is a turban ornament that was worn by significant Hindu, Sikh and Muslim princes. Sar means "head" or "front" and pech means "screw", giving the word "sarpech" the literal meaning "that which is screwed onto the front (of the turban)". The sarpech was also worn in Persia, where it was known as jikka or jiqa (Persian: جقه), meaning "crest" or "tuft", and in Turkey, where it was known as the sorguch, a name considered a corrupt form of the Persian word sarpush.

In India, dominantly two kinds of turban ornaments exist: the sarpech and the Kalgi (ornament).

== Origin and etymology ==
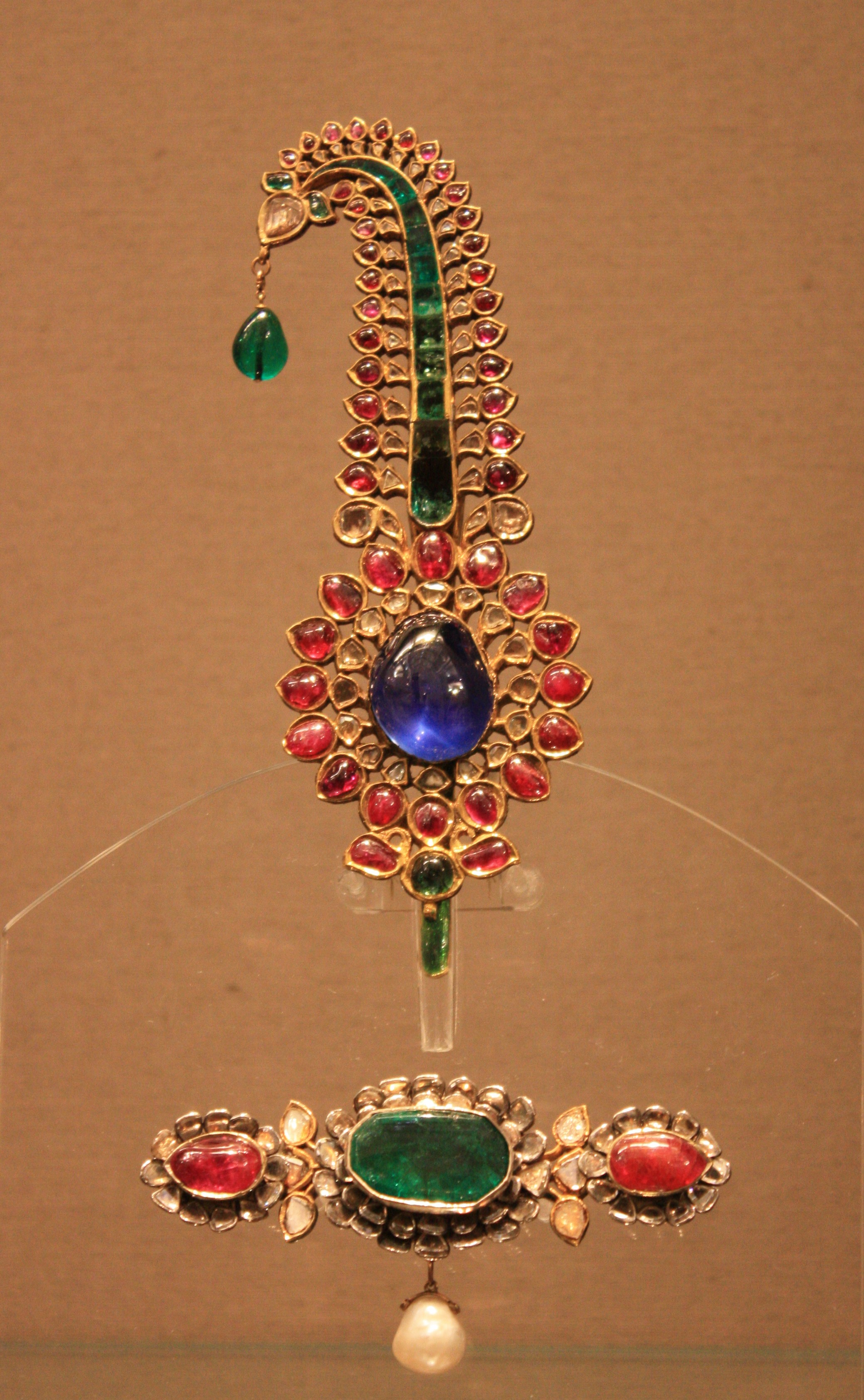
Jadau sarpech (turban ornament), 18th-century

In India, various types of Sarpech are found depending on their time of production. Those produced in the 16th and 17th centuries resembled a plume and were worn on the right side of the turban. Their material depended on the occasion. The original 16th-century Sarpech was a single unit; then, in the 18th century, two side units were added. With the 19th century, emphasis on elaborate jewelry increased and there were Sarpech big enough to cover half the turban.

== Structure ==
This is a general description of the Sarpech. The basic structure of a gold Indian Sarpech is flat (hamwar). It is a single sheet of metal with gemstones set in its hollow construction. Designs are usually symmetrical (ba-qarina) and gemstones are set (jadau) on the front (rukh). The backside is exquisitely enameled too but remains hidden from the viewer. Sarpeches with one upward rising unit are known as ek kalangi while those with three projections are called tin kalangi. Most Sarpech patterns are floral in nature and seem to have borrowed from the existing textile vocabulary in Mughal India.

== See also ==
- Chelengk
