= Margret Craver =

American metal artist, educator (1907–2010)

- Born: October 11, 1907; Kansas City, Missouri, U.S.
- Died: November 22, 2010 (aged 103); Cambridge, Massachusetts, U.S.
- Known for: Metalwork, jewelcrafting
- Movement: Studio Jewelry Movement
- Spouse(s): Charles C. Withers (married 1950; died 1985)

Margret Craver (October 11, 1907 – November 22, 2010) was an American artist and arts educator. She was noted for her jewelry and holloware as well as her educational and technical manuals on metalwork.

== Early life and career ==
Craver was born in Kansas City, Missouri on October 11, 1907.

She became interested in metalwork while studying at the University of Kansas, and after graduation traveled to Europe for study, as training in metalworking techniques was not available in the United States at the time. There she studied under Baron Erik Fleming, at the time the court silversmith to the King of Sweden. Craver established the department of jewelry and metalsmithing at the Wichita Arts Association in 1935, and throughout the 1930s she continued to travel the US and abroad for further training in the craft of metalwork.

She was introduced to Charles Withers, president of Massachusetts-based Towle Silversmiths, in 1949, and the two were married the next year. She continued to be known professionally under her maiden name.

== Influence on US metalwork ==
While working in a military hospital during World War II, Craver became interested in the teaching of metalworking as occupational therapy for wounded veterans, finding that the repetitive movements were useful in rehabilitation. She left Wichita to organize metalworking workshops in veteran's hospitals in New York.

In the late 1940s and early 1950s, Craver developed a series of summer workshops, modeled on similar programs in England, to allow teachers of metalwork to develop advanced skills. She also created a number of films and manuals on metalworking techniques for use by instructors. Because of her efforts, Craver has been credited as instrumental in the revitalization of the craft of silversmithing in the United States.

== En résille ==
In 1953, Craver first encountered the disused enameling technique en résille, in which enamel-coated metal foil is embedded in glass. Craver revived the technique, researching it over the course of about thirteen years to reproduce and perfect it. Because the technique was not being practiced, and there were no instructional texts in existence, the work was slow, and Craver had to design her own tools. On the technique, Craver said, "it took forever, because this was such an ancient technique and no one knew a darn thing about it. I just had to start out and do it myself."
