= Safed chalwan =

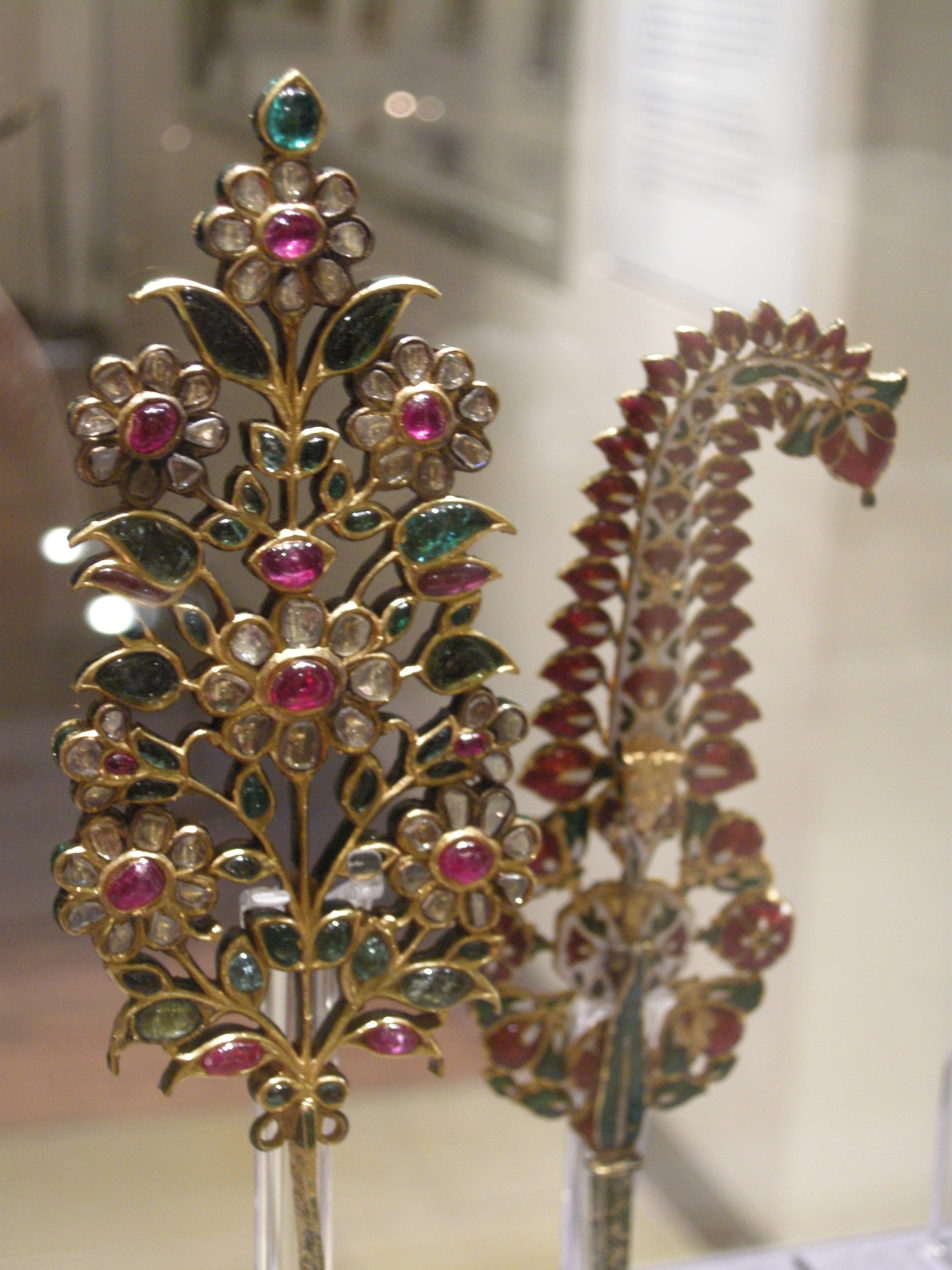
Sarpech (Turban ornament) with Safed chalwan back

Safed Chalwan is a kind of white translucent enamel used for encrusting gems and precious stones for making jewels.

This enamel is used at the reverse side of the jewels in order to contrast the color of the gems (usually ruby or jade) with a stark white background.

== Technique of enameling ==
In this technique of enameling, an opaque white outlined cartouche is fired and leveled with the stone to be embedded. On cooling down the enamel develops a hard coating around and the stone is set in it.
