= Dostoevsky Museum =

Museum in Saint Petersburg, Russia

Coordinates: 59°55′38″N 30°21′03″E

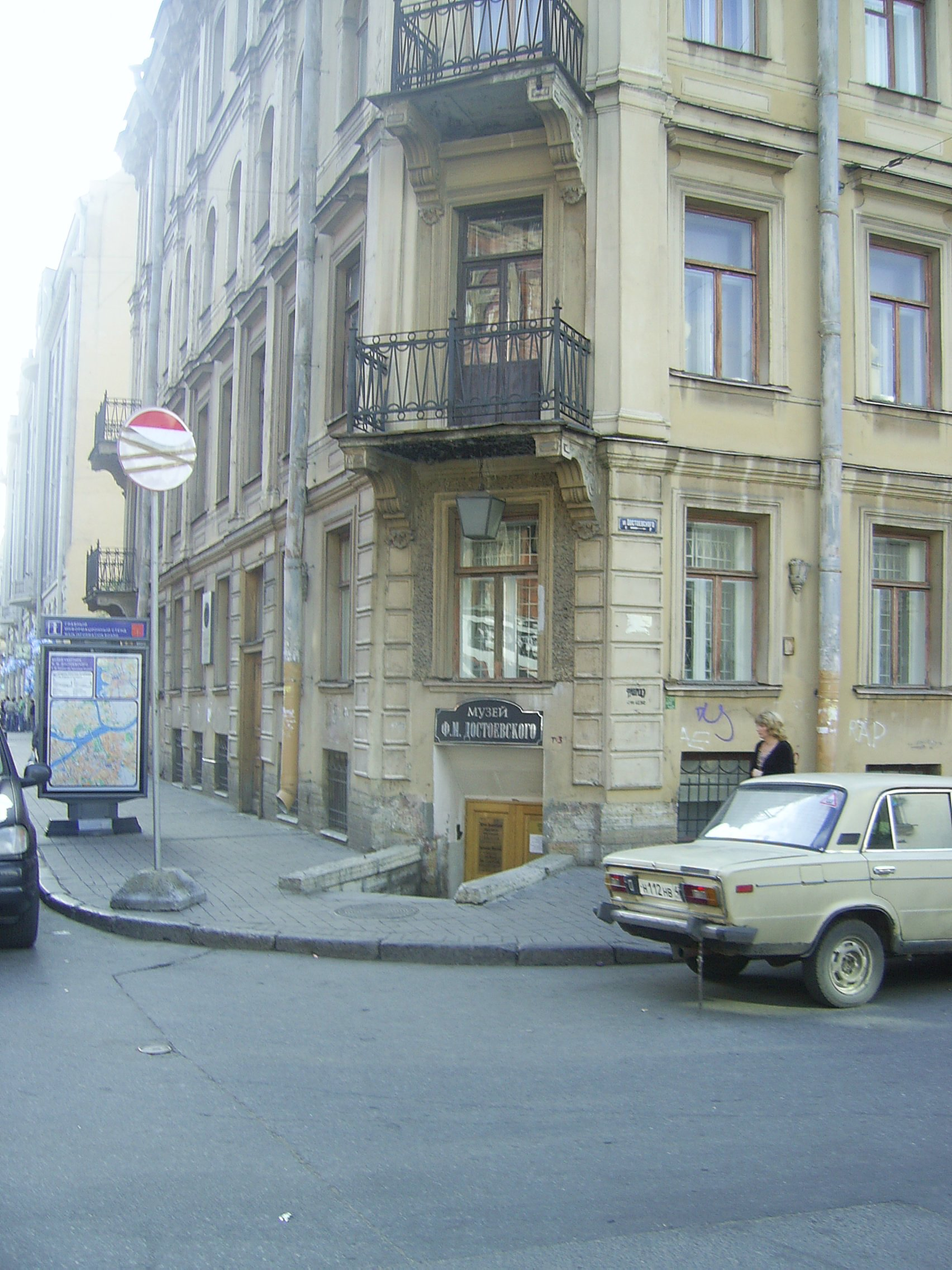
The Dostoevsky Museum at the corner of Kuznetsjny Pereulok and Dostoevskogo Ulitsa.

The F. M. Dostoyevsky Literary Memorial Museum (Государственный Литературно-мемориальный музей Ф. М. Достоевского), located on Kuznechny Lane 5/2 in Saint Petersburg, was opened on November 12, 1971 in the former apartment of the Russian writer Fyodor Dostoyevsky.

Dostoyevsky lived in the apartment twice during his life: first for a short period in 1846 in the beginnings of his career, and later from October 1878 until his death in January 1881. The apartment was his home during the composition of some of his most notable works, including The Double: A Petersburg Poem (1846) and The Brothers Karamazov (1879–1880). The apartment has been reconstructed based on the memoirs of the writer's second wife, Anna Dostoyevskaya, and his friends.

== Museum features ==
The museum library holds about 24,000 volumes and a small collection of manuscripts.

Every November, the museum hosts an international scholarly conference, Dostoyevsky and World Culture, and a journal of the same name is published with the conference proceedings.

The museum is included in cultural tours in Saint Petersburg, some specifically focusing upon Dostoevsky.

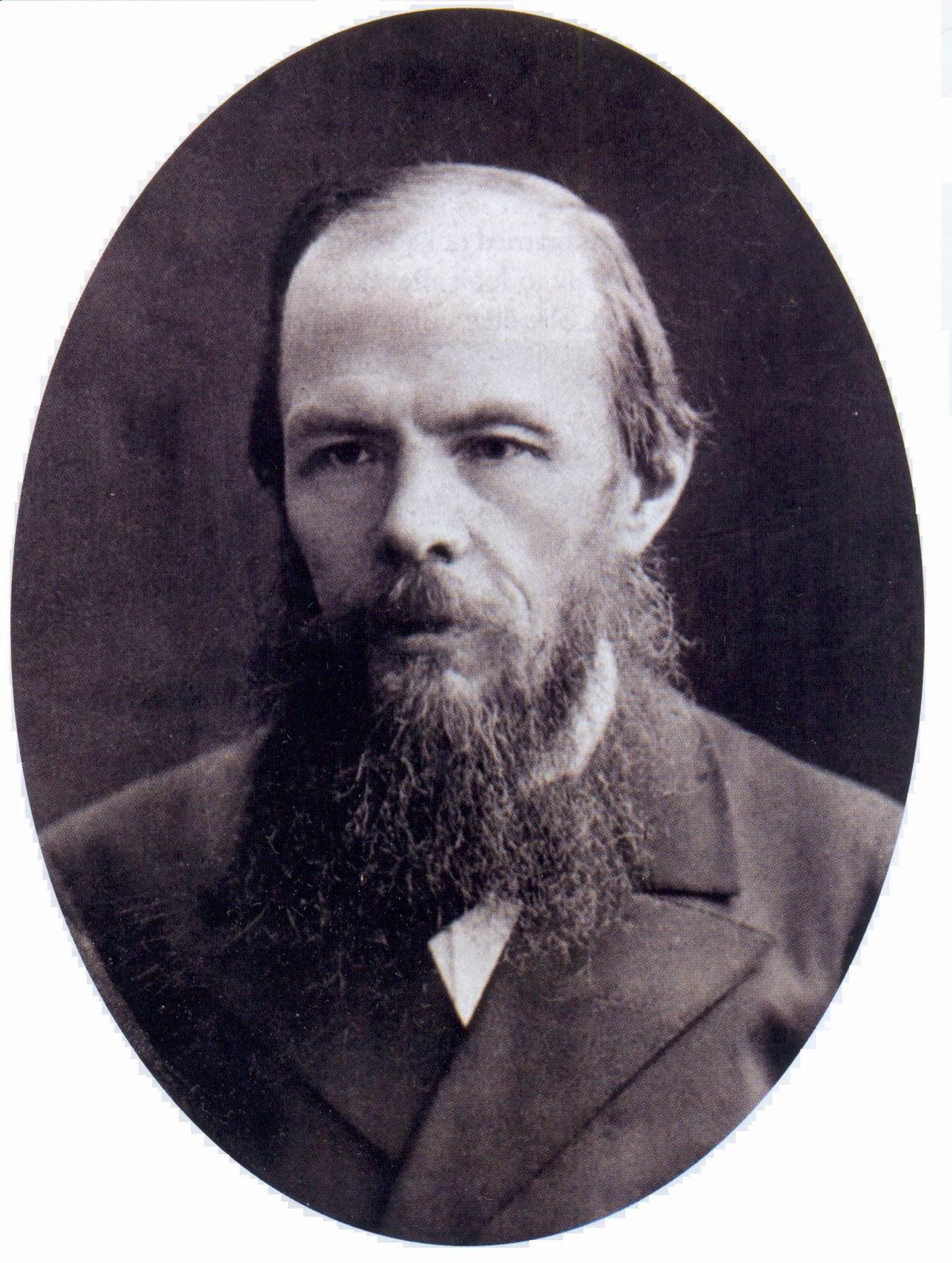
Fyodor Mikhailovich Dostoyevsky, pictured in 1871.

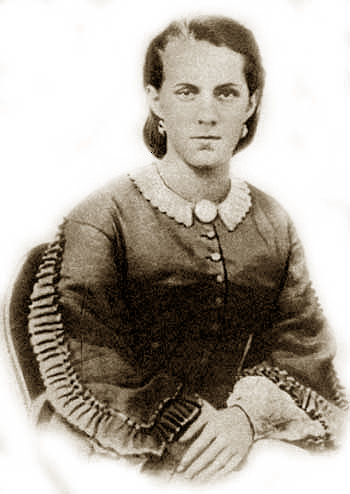
The author's second wife, Anna Dostoyevskaya.

== See also ==
- List of museums in Saint Petersburg
