= Thesmar =

Thesmar is a surname. Notable people with the surname include:

- André Fernand Thesmar (1843–1912), French enameler
- David Thesmar (born 1972), French economist
- Ghislaine Thesmar (born 1943), French ballet dancer and choreographer
