= Kawade Shibatarō =

Japanese cloisonné artist (1856–1921)

Kawade Shibatarō (川出柴太郎, 1856–1921) was a Japanese artist working in shippo (cloisonné enamel). (Note: Shippo is a portmanteau of shichi ("seven") and ho ("treasures") (Harada 1911, p. 271)) As head of the Ando Cloisonné Company, he introduced a number of technical innovations, expanding the colours that could be rendered in enamel and bringing the company to a new level of success. Under his leadership, the company exhibited at world's fairs, winning multiple awards. It was also appointed as an official supplier of cloisonné works for the Japanese imperial family.

== Biography ==
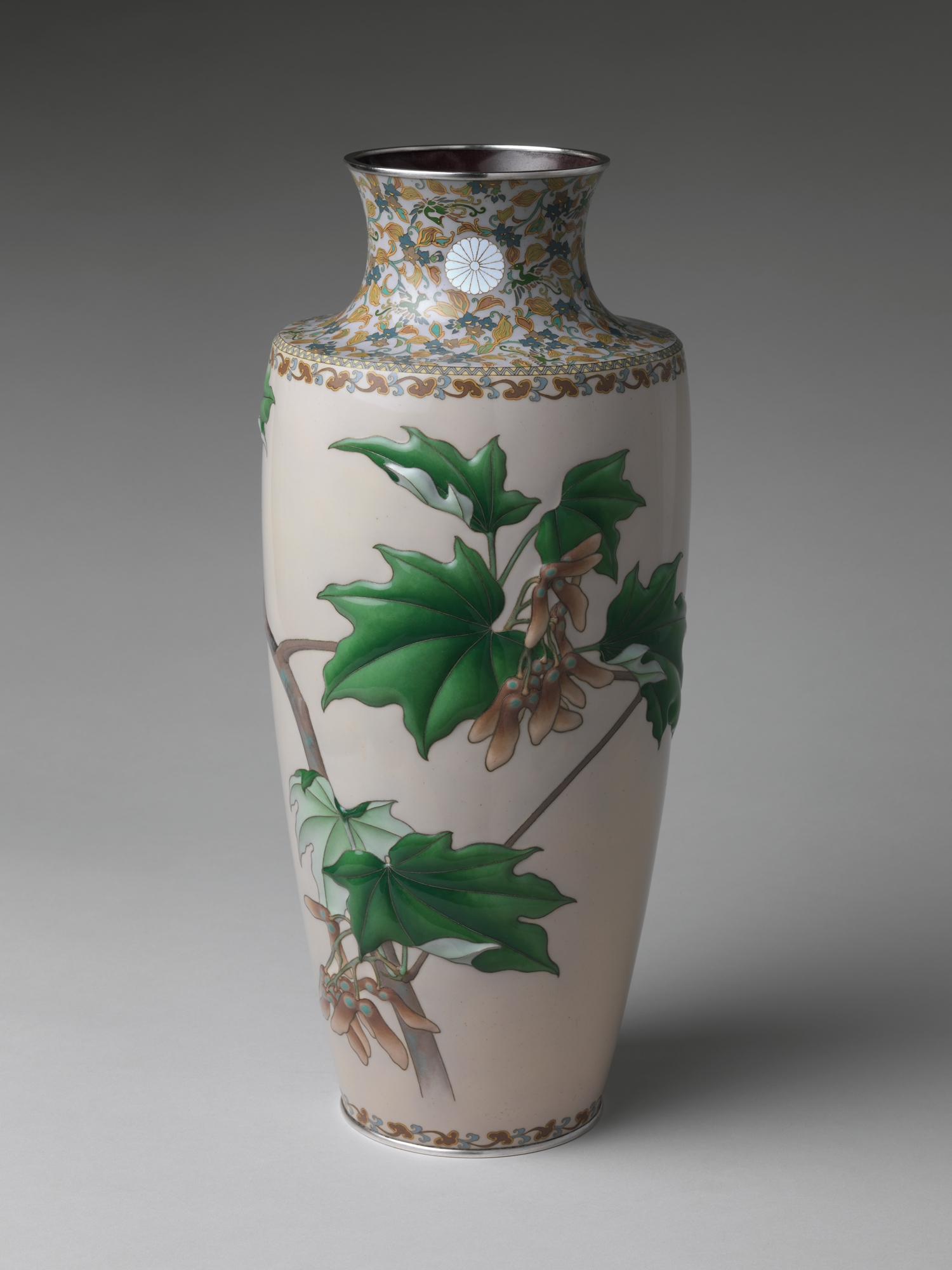
Imperial presentation vase with maple branches and Imperial Seal of Japan, standard and repoussé cloisonné enamel with silver wires and rims, by Kawade Shibatarō and Ando Cloisonné Company (c. 1906)

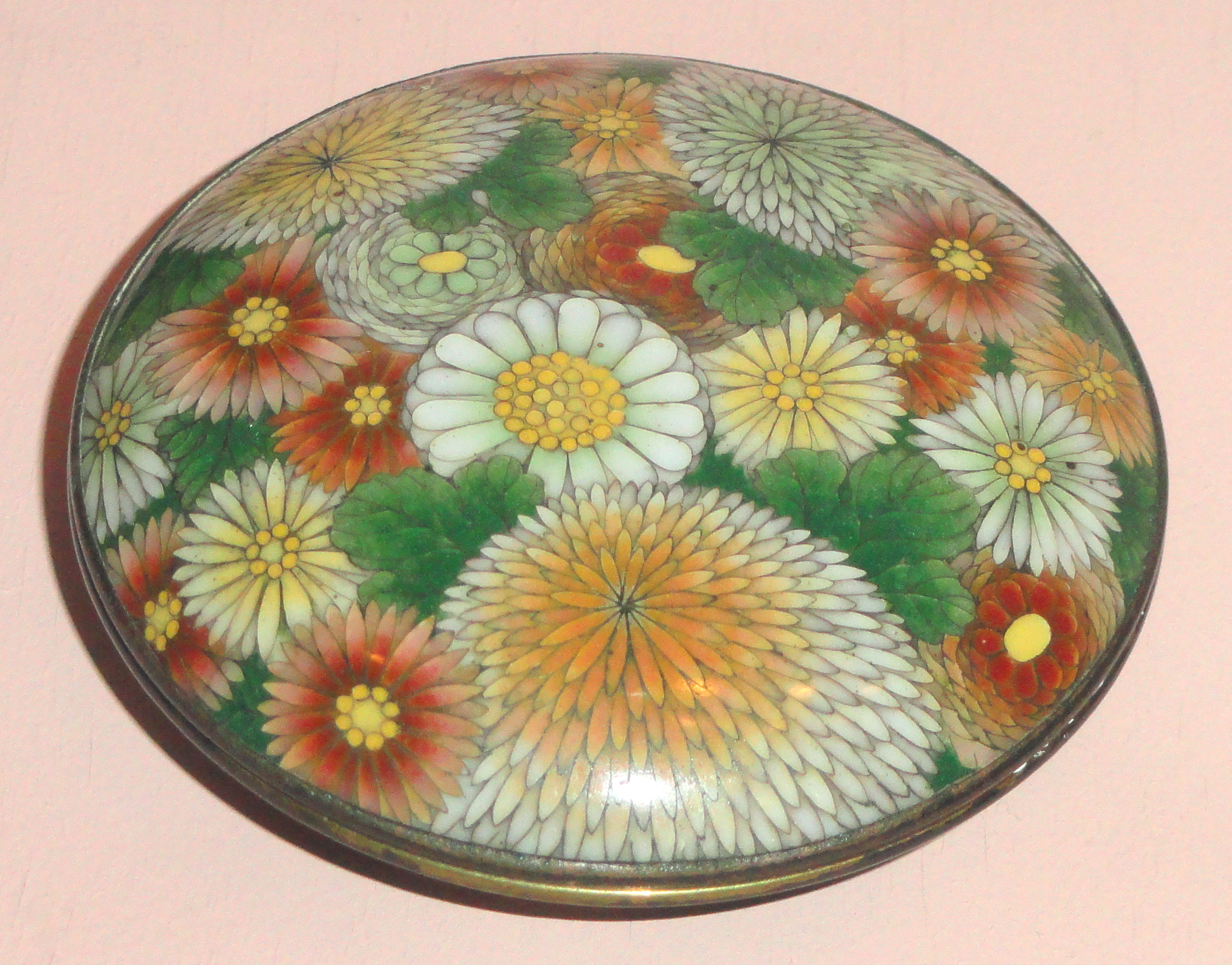
Cloisonné circular box with colourful flowers in yūsen shippō (有線七宝) technique

Kawade came to prominence during the "Golden Age" of Japanese cloisonné in the late Meiji era. This was a time of experimentation and technical innovation, when Japanese artists produced works more advanced than had been achieved before, which could not be replicated with modern techniques. During the 1880s he ran his own workshop and also worked for the Ando Cloisonné Company in Nagoya. In 1902 he became the head of the company, succeeding Kaji Satarō.

Along with Hattori Tadasaburō, Kawade developed the moriage (盛上七宝 "piling up") technique which places layers of enamel upon each other to create a three-dimensional effect, often used in depicting flowers or blossoms. Another technique he invented was nagare-gusuri (drip-glaze), which produces a rainbow-coloured glaze. In 1902, he was the first Japanese artist to use the uchidashi (repoussé) technique, in which the metal foundation is hammered outwards to create a relief effect. He also used the new plique-à-jour technique (shōtai-jippō 省胎七宝in Japanese) which creates panels of transparent or semi-transparent enamel. Enamel cloisons, linked by wires, are prepared on a copper surface which is then burned away with acid while the enamel itself is protected by lacquer. This was invented in France and came to Japan when Ando Jubei, one of the founders of the Ando Cloisonné Company, bought an enamel by André Fernand Thesmar at the Paris Exposition of 1900. Kawade analysed this piece to replicate and then further develop the technique.

== Recognition ==
In 1911 the art historian Jiro Harada wrote that Kawade was

deservedly considered the greatest enamel expert in the manufacture of shippo at the present time. [...] He has been engaged in the shippo industry for the last forty years, and the advantage of his scientific knowledge and his indefatigable devotion to the work have enabled him to invent new colours in enamels.

Kawade exhibited works at the World's Columbian Exposition of 1893 in Chicago, at Japan's fifth National Industrial Exposition in 1903, at the Louisiana Purchase Exposition of 1904, at the Universal and International Exposition in Liège in 1905, and at the Japan-British Exhibition of 1910 in London. He won a gold medal at the Panama–Pacific International Exposition of 1915 in San Francisco.

The Ando Cloisonné Company was chosen as a supplier of art for the Imperial family and as such was commissioned to make works, bearing the Imperial chrysanthemum seal, that the family could present as gifts. One such work, executed by Kawade in 1906, was a pair of vases presented by the Emperor to the American cartoonist Henry Mayer, thanking him for cartoons on the Russo-Japanese War published in The New York Times.

He is considered one of the four great masters of Japanese cloisonné, along with Namikawa Yasuyuki, Namikawa Sosuke and Hayashi Kodenji.

Outside of Japan his works are in collections including the Metropolitan Museum of Art, the George Walter Vincent Smith Art Museum, the Los Angeles County Museum of Art, and the Khalili Collection of Japanese Art of the Meiji Era.

== Gallery ==
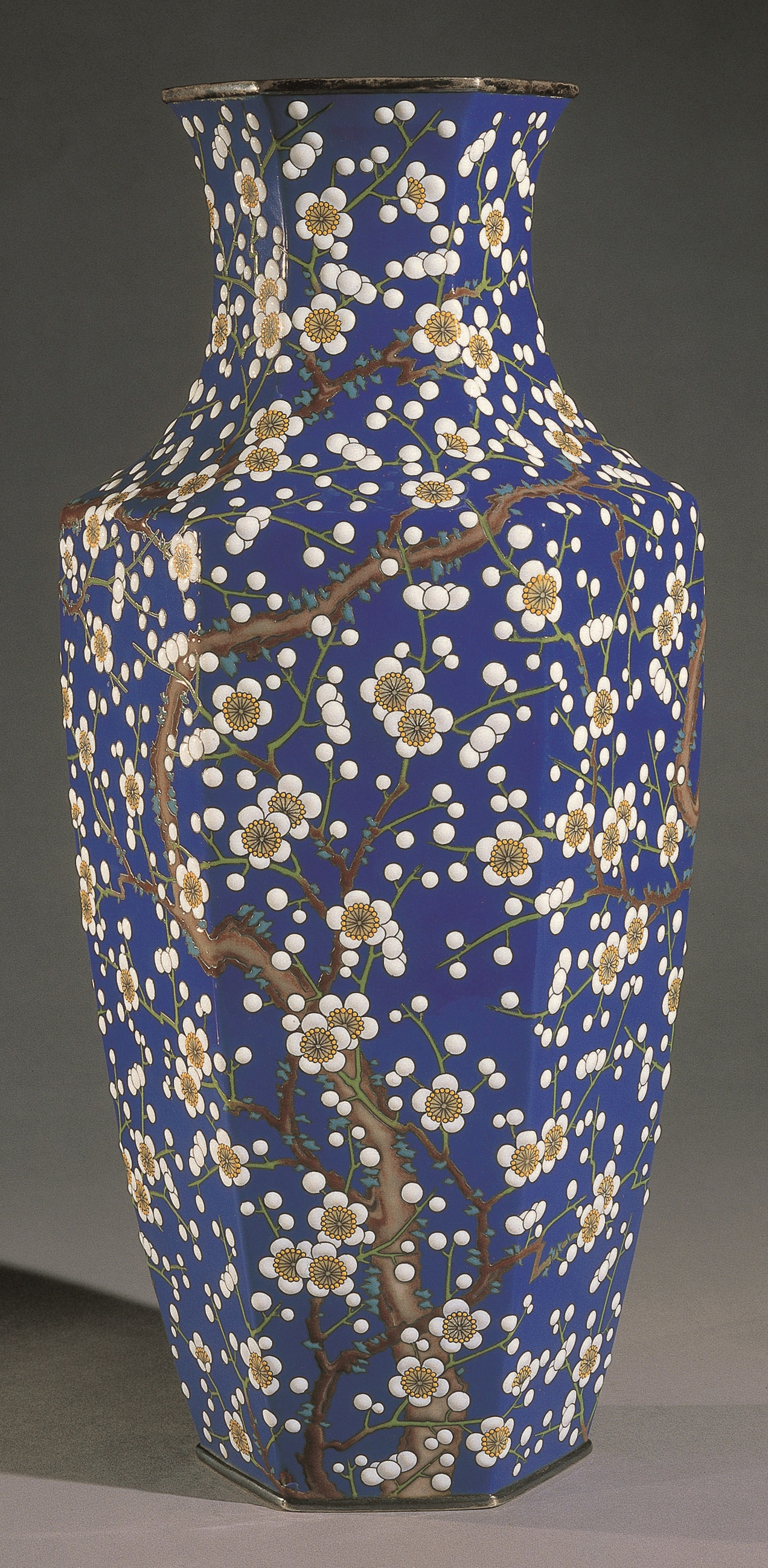
Vase using moriage shippō (盛上七宝) technique to raise the plum blossom and branches (c. 1905)

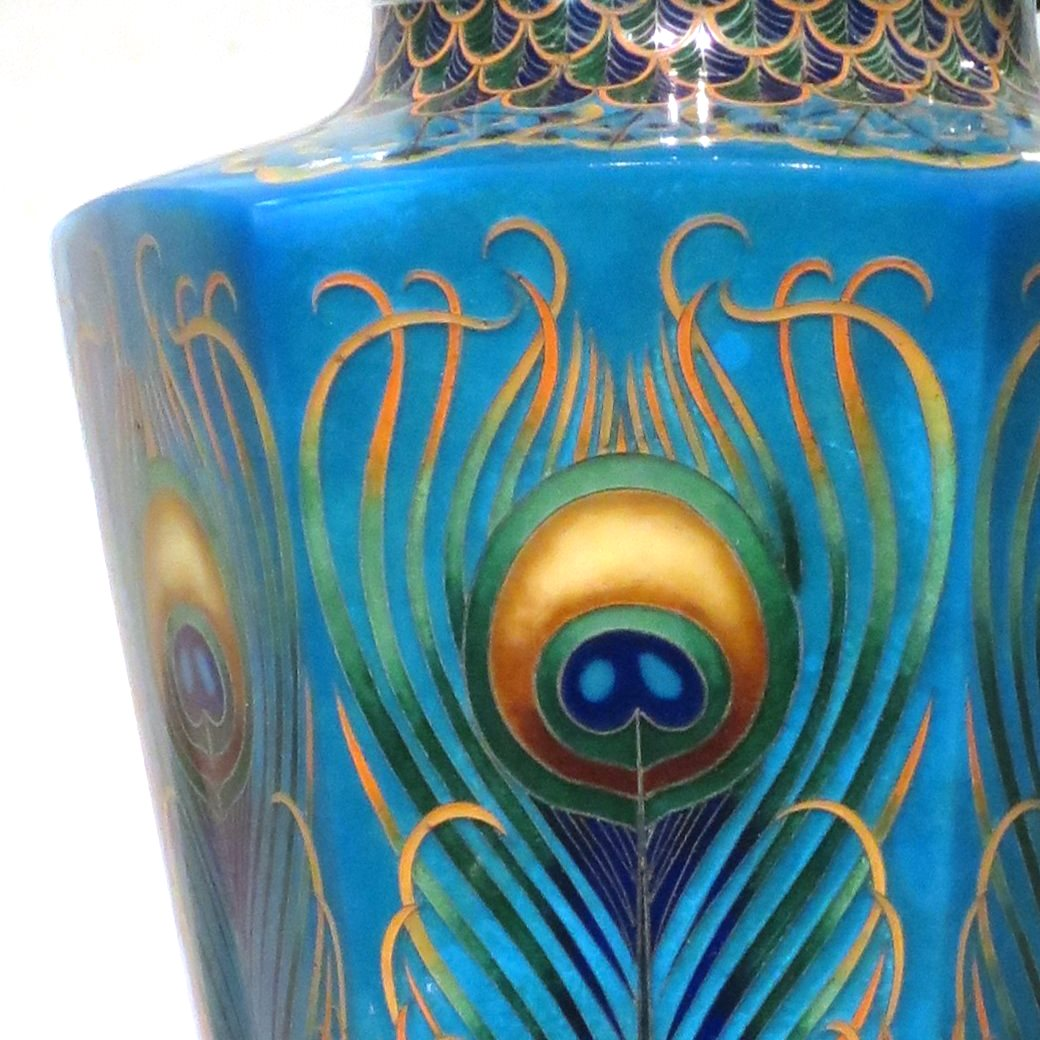
Detail of a vase with design of peacock feathers in gintai shippō (銀胎七宝) silver enamel

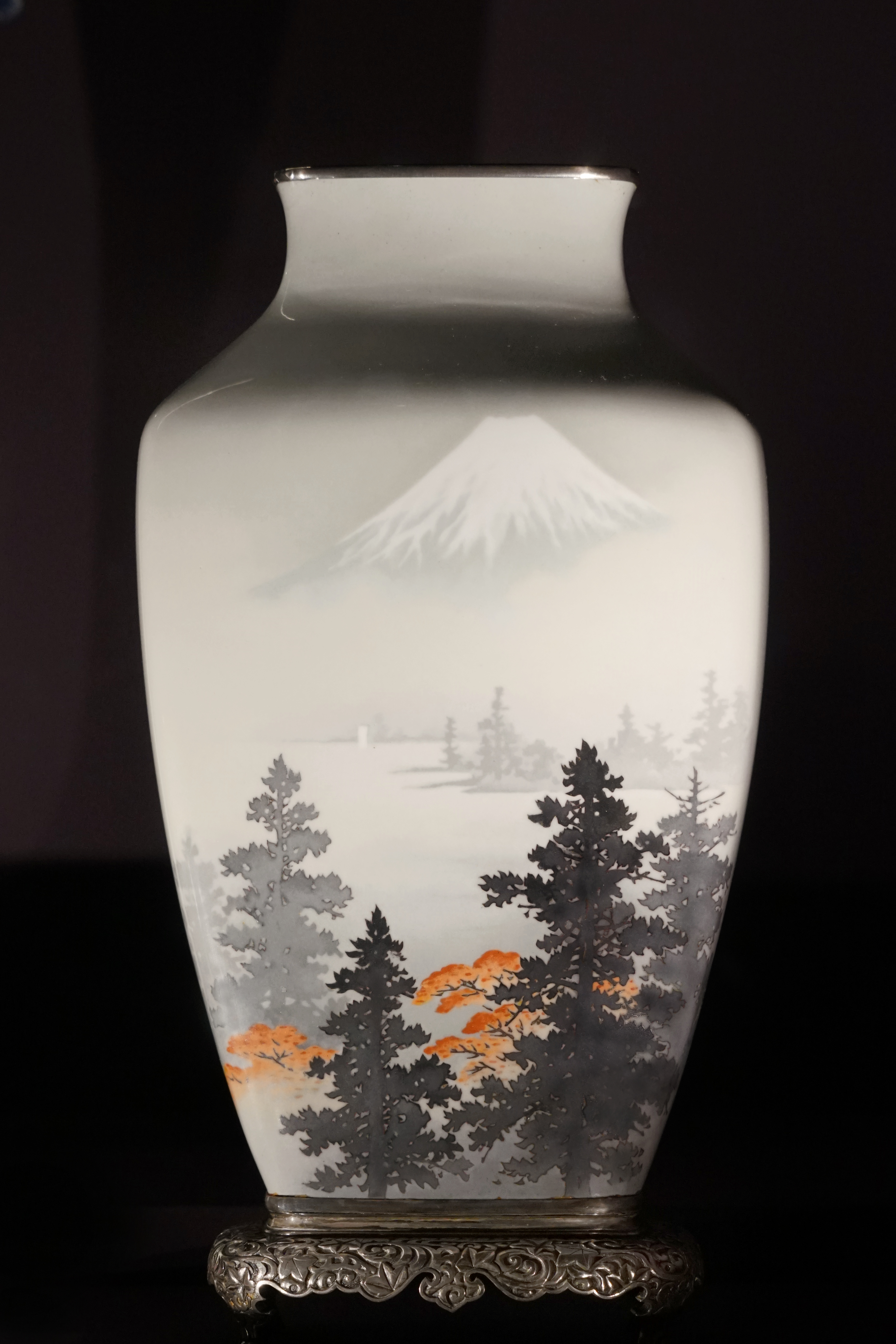
Vase depicting Mount Fuji (c. 1910)

== Bibliography ==
- Earle, Joe (1999). Splendors of Meiji : treasures of imperial Japan : masterpieces from the Khalili Collection. St. Petersburg, Fla.: Broughton International Inc. ISBN 1874780137. OCLC 42476594.
- Harada, Jiro (1911). "Japanese Art & Artists of To-day VI. Cloisonné Enamels". The Studio. 53: 271–286 – via Internet Archive.
