= Kin'unken =

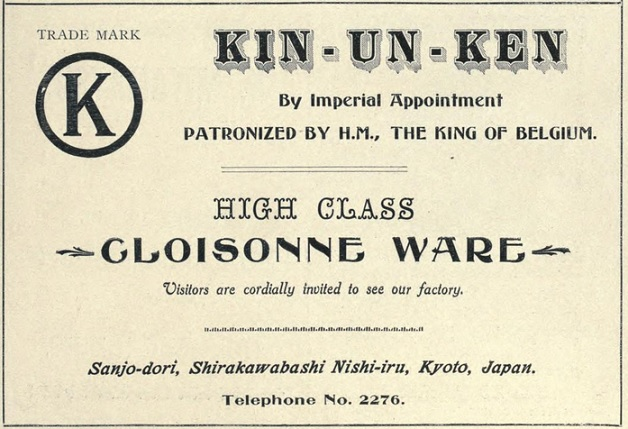
Advertisement for the Kin'unken cloisonné company (c. 1910)

Kin'unken (錦雲軒七宝焼 Kin'unken Shippōyaki) was a Japanese cloisonnéーmaking company located in Kyoto, Japan.

The company was given an imperial warrant of appointment to the Japanese court and was also patronized by the King of the Belgians.

Objects from Kin'unken are traded at auctions for high prices.

== See also ==
- Ando Cloisonné Company
- Japanese craft
- List of Traditional Crafts of Japan
