= Ando Cloisonné Company =

Japanese enamelling company in Sakae, Nagoya

Ando Cloisonné 安藤七宝店
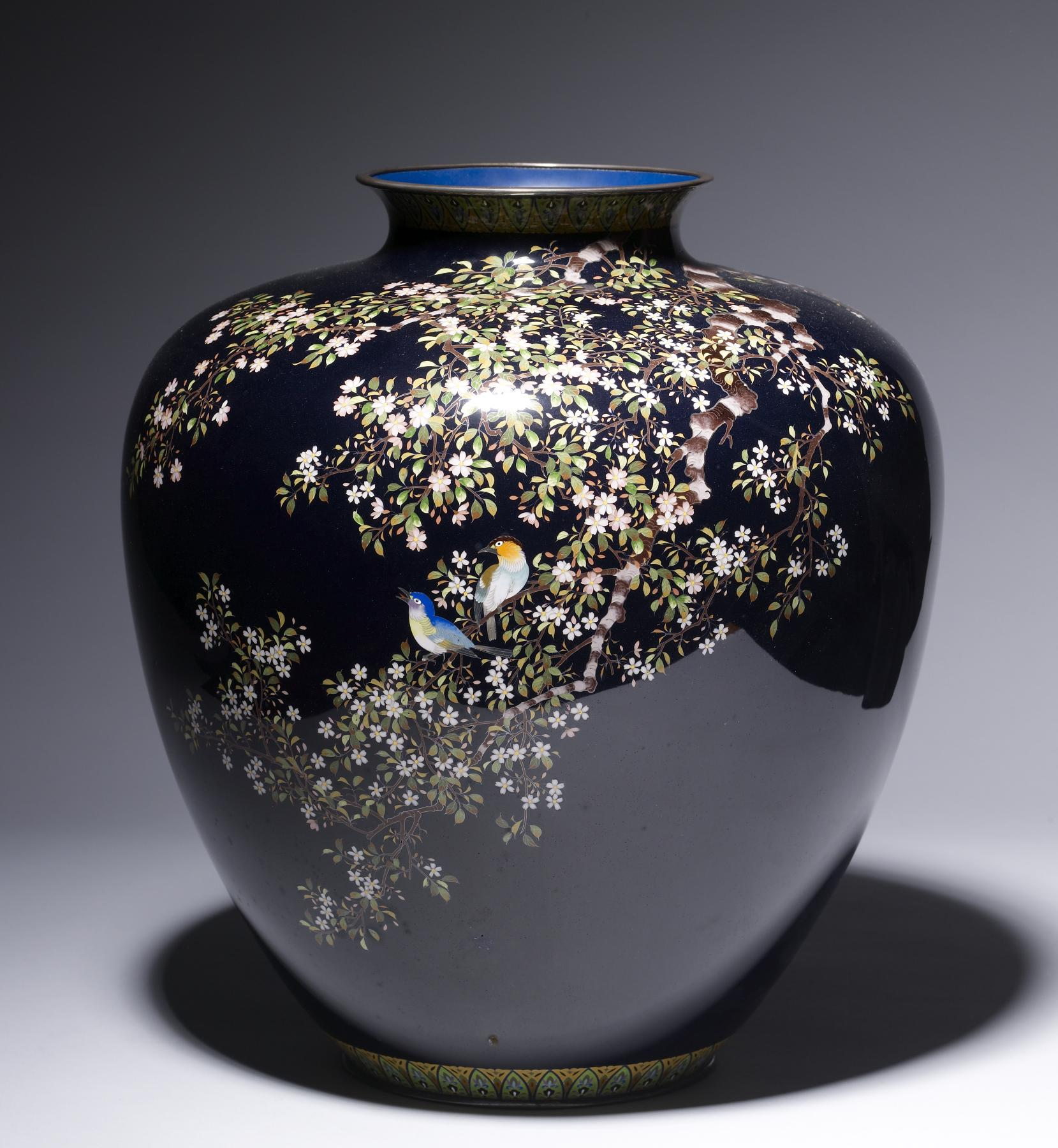
- Vase with flowering cherry and birds motif (c. 1910)
- Type: Private
- Industry: Japanese craft
- Founded: 19th century
- Founder: Andō Jubei
- Headquarters: Sakae, Nagoya, Japan
- Key people: Andō family, Kawade Shibatarō
- Products: Enamelware (Japanese: Owari Shippo)
- Website: ando-shippo.co.jp

Ando Cloisonné Company (安藤七宝店, Andō Shipōyaki) is a Japanese: Owari Shippo cloisonné making company located in Sakae, Nagoya, central Japan.

== History ==
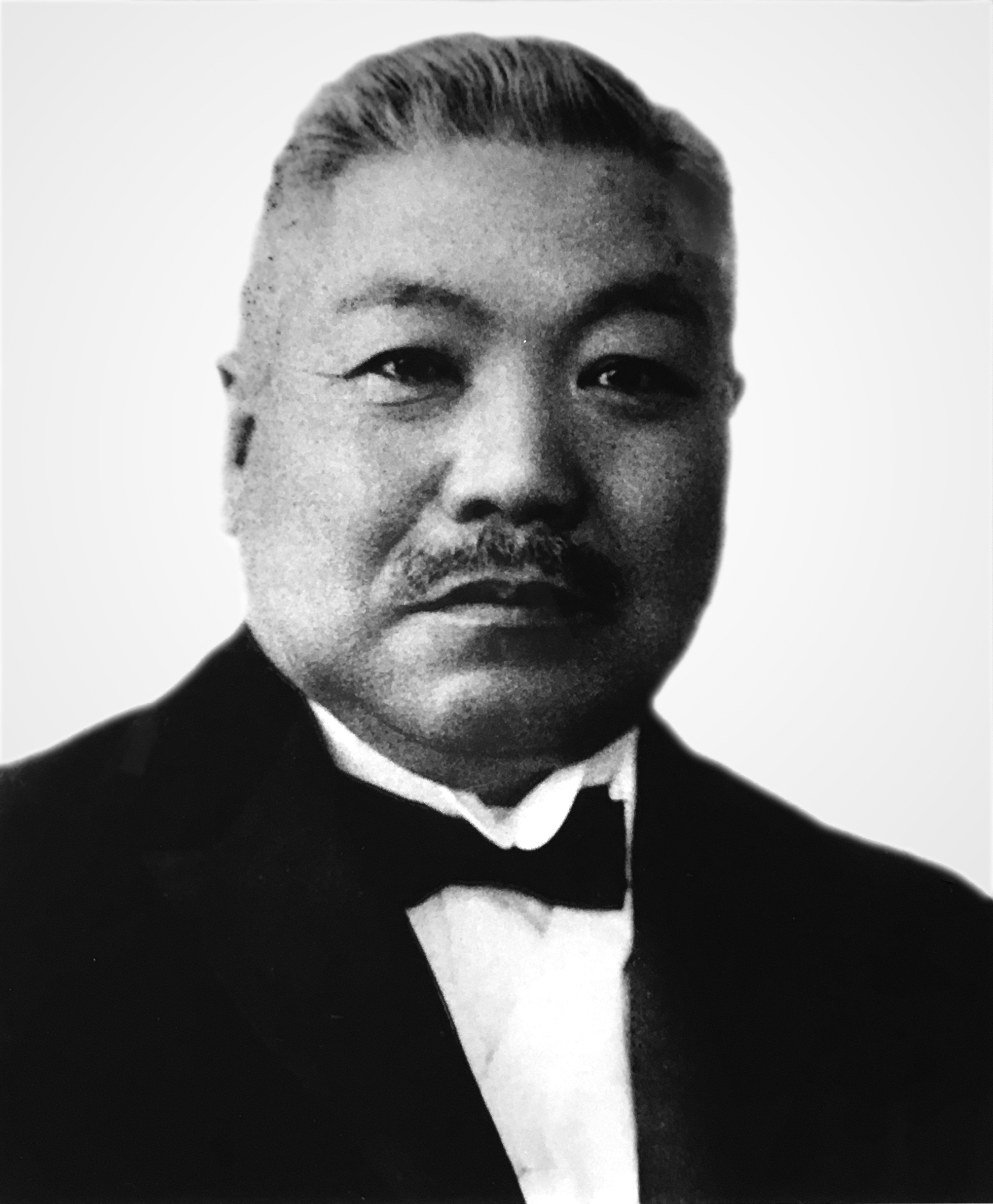
Andō Juzaemon, one of the founders of the company

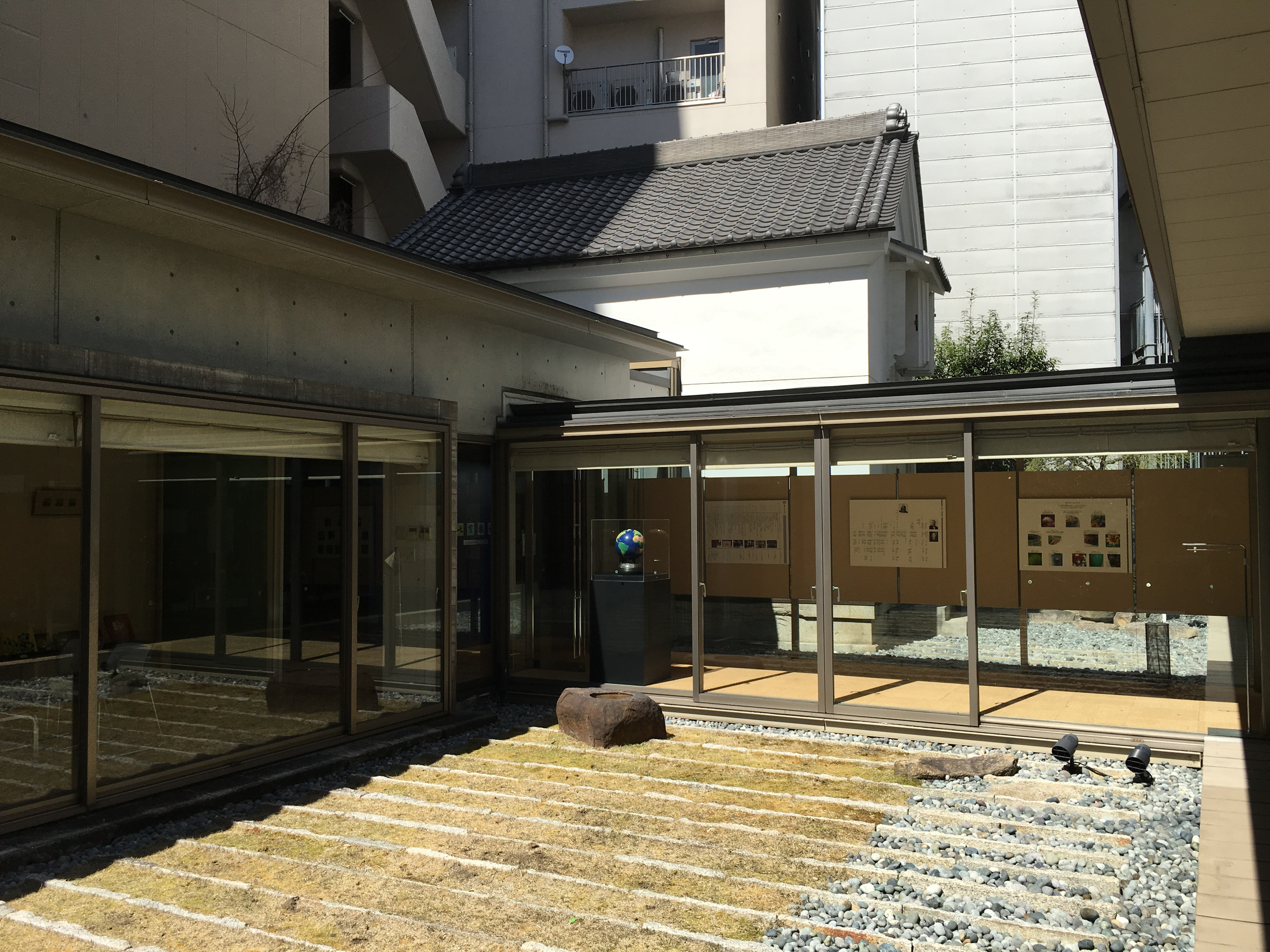
Main store and museum in Sakae, Nagoya

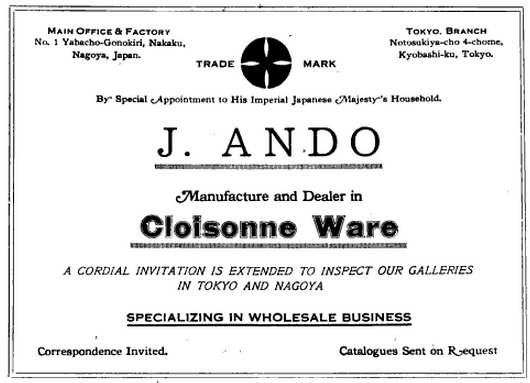
1920s advertisement for the company

Owari province was one of the foremost production centres of enamel in the country. During the Edo period the Andō family operated a pipe shop called "Murata-ya". Andō Jubei (Jusaburo) (1876–1953) was born in Nagoya as the fourth child, with three elder sisters. His mother died in May 1877 following an illness, and his father followed in September 1877. Orphaned at less than one year old, he was raised according to his father's will by staff employers. His older sister married Andō Juzaemon, whose birth name was Matsukichi. Together with his brother-in-law, they made the cloisonné company a success. In 1893, Andō Juzaemon went to the World's Columbian Exposition in Chicago. It was his first time to travel overseas, and he used the opportunity to study the market. In 1901, Andō Jubei went to the Glasgow International Exhibition, which was his first overseas travel, and he stayed for two years in a British home to study the market.

After they returned to Japan, they invited Kawade Shibatarō (1856–1921) as head of the studio, who further developed plique-à-jour. Cloisonné experienced strong growth around the time of the Paris Exposition Universelle in 1900. Japanese enamel work became sought after in the West, and many pieces were sourced from Toshima, which is the origin of Owari cloisonné.

As of 1918, at least fifty cloisonné artists were working there. The company was given an Imperial Warrant of Appointment to the Japanese court. Andō cloisonné was also presented as state gifts. Manchukuo Prime Minister Zheng Xiaoxu (1860–1938) wrote four Chinese characters in calligraphy in praise of a vase that was presented to him as a gift.

It is one of the very few traditional cloisonné companies still left in Japan. The main store in Sakae has a small museum with objects by various artisans and designers of the Andō company, as well as Namikawa Sōsuke. Objects from Ando are held in the collection of the Walters Art Museum and in the Victoria and Albert Museum.

=== Collaborations and contemporary practice ===
In 2008, the company entered into a collaboration with Grand Seiko to produce cloisonné dials. More recently, Ando Cloisonné made the dials for Seiko's 110th Anniversary limited edition of its "Presage" wristwatches in 2018. Ando has collaborated with Japanese and international artists and designers such as Hella Jongerius and Philippe Malouin, and was selected in 2025 to take part in the second edition of the Craft x Tech initiative. The programme is an exploration of how traditional "aesthetic sensibilities embedded in Japanese craft can be reimagined through a thoughtful and skilful creative process" and reinterpreted through the lens of contemporary technology and design. Ando Cloisonné has also collaborated with companies like Toyota, and has worked on the restoration of historical monuments such as Nagoya Castle's Honmaru Palace, and the ornamentation of important new buildings including the Kyoto State Guest House.

== Types ==
Shipōyaki is a kind of cloisonné, in which the base is covered by enamel and fused. The different types and techniques which are the marks of Andō include:

- Musen shippō (無線七宝) wireless cloisonné; enamel is applied to the body or the wire while being painted, the wire is then removed before firing the object
- Yūsen shippō (有線七宝) wired cloisonné with silver, a typical technique from Owari province
- Moriage shippō (盛上七宝) is raised cloisonné above the wires. Kawade Shibatarō was a master in this area, producing wares for the Tokyo Imperial Palace.
- Tōtai shippō (透胎七宝) parts are cut into an object's body, then filled with semi-translucent or translucent enamel resembling stained glass
- Shōtai shippō (省胎七宝) uses translucent enamels applied through yūsen shippō, but the metal is then dissolved in nitric acid
- Saiyū shippō / tsuiki shippō (彩釉七宝 / 鎚起七宝) is when the vessel has raised contours that have been hammered out, with coloured cloisonné applied on it
- Émail shippō (エマイル七宝), the term is a composite of the French term for enamel and the Japanese term, which is a double glaze to prevent corrosion
- Dōtai shippō (銅胎七宝) copper enamels
- Gintai shippō (銀胎七宝) sterling silver enamels
- Tōmeiyū shippō (透明釉七宝) transparent enamels
- Han-tōmeiyū shippō (半透明釉七宝) translucent or semi-transparent enamels
- Fu-tōmeiyū shippō (不透明釉七宝) opaque enamels
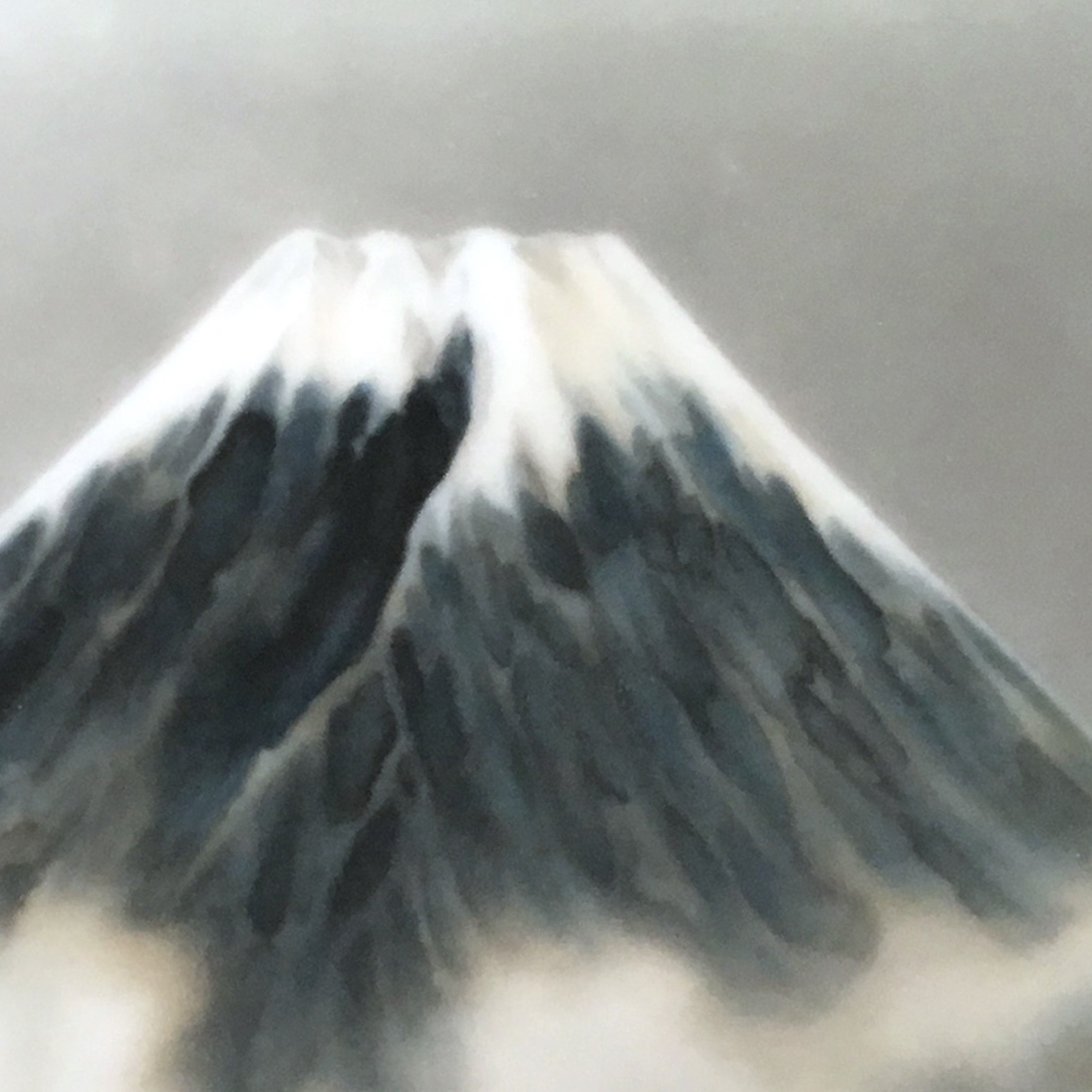
Musen shippō

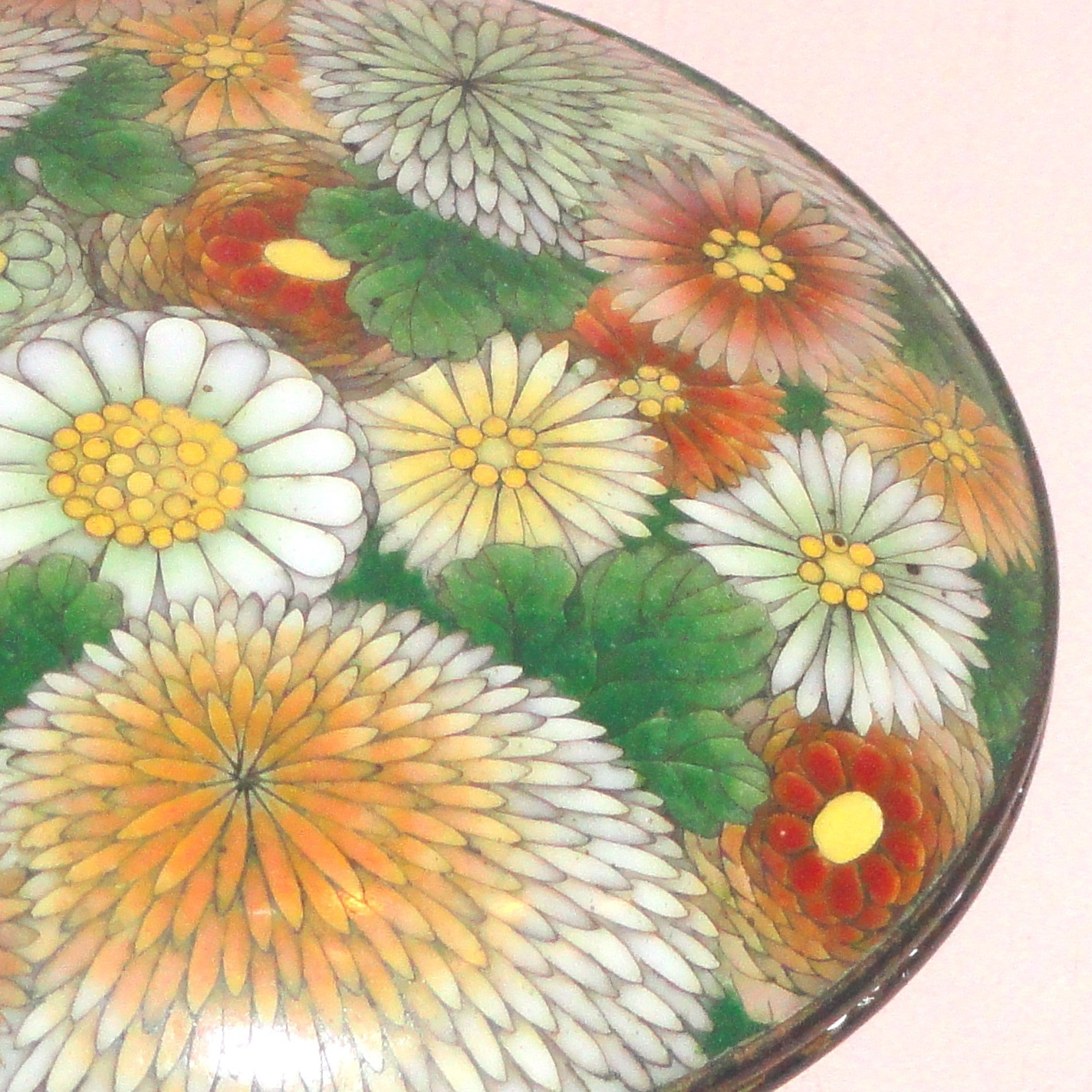
Yūsen shippō

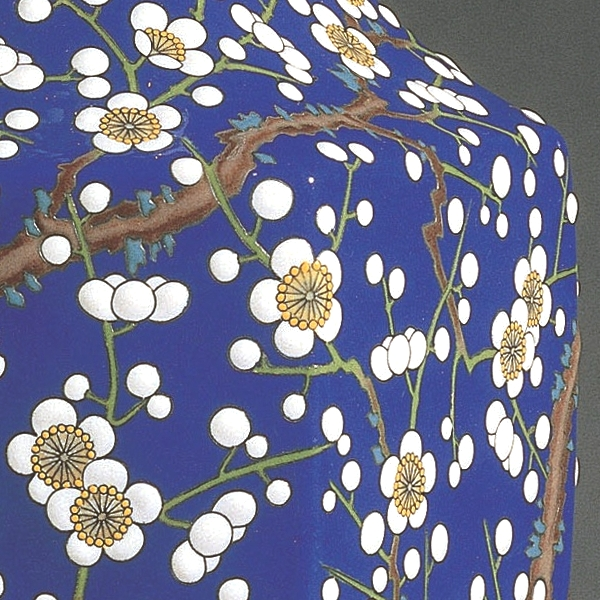
Moriage shippō

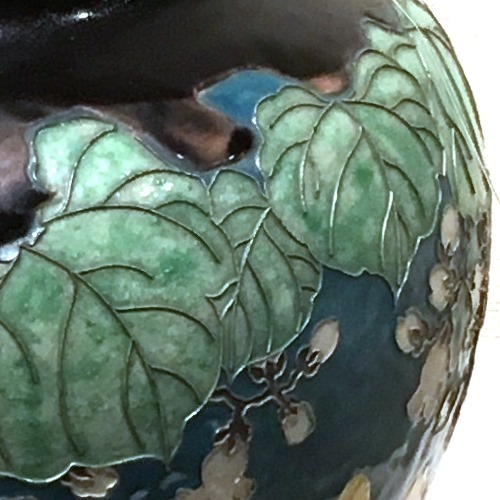
Tōtai shippō

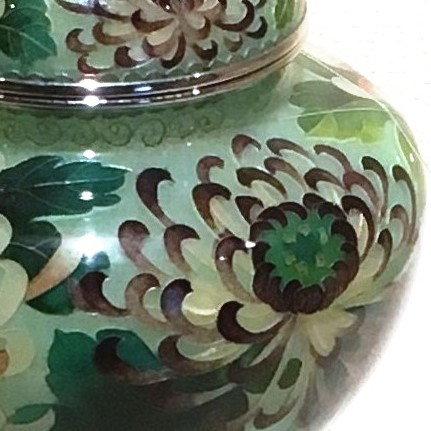
Shōtai shippō

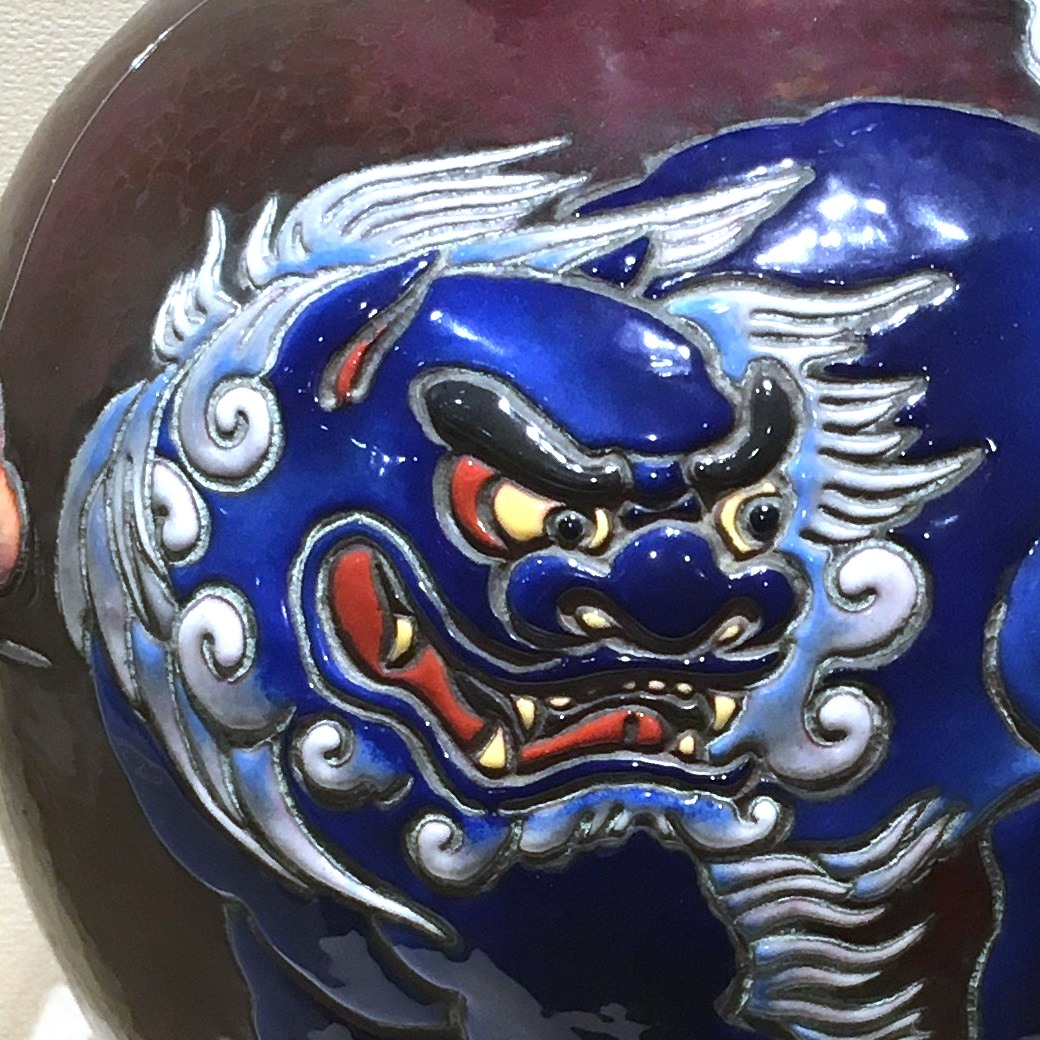
Tsuiki shippō (saiyū shippō)

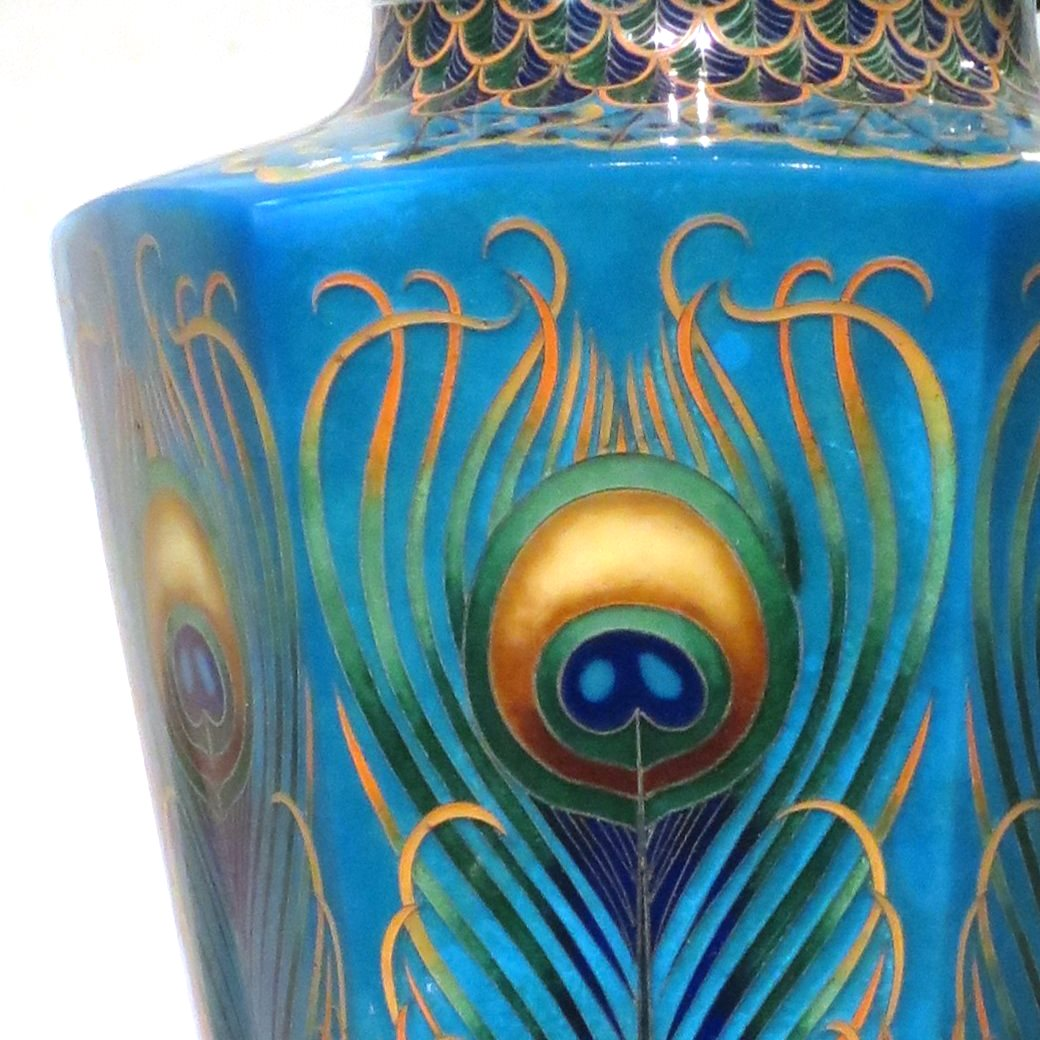
Gintai shippō

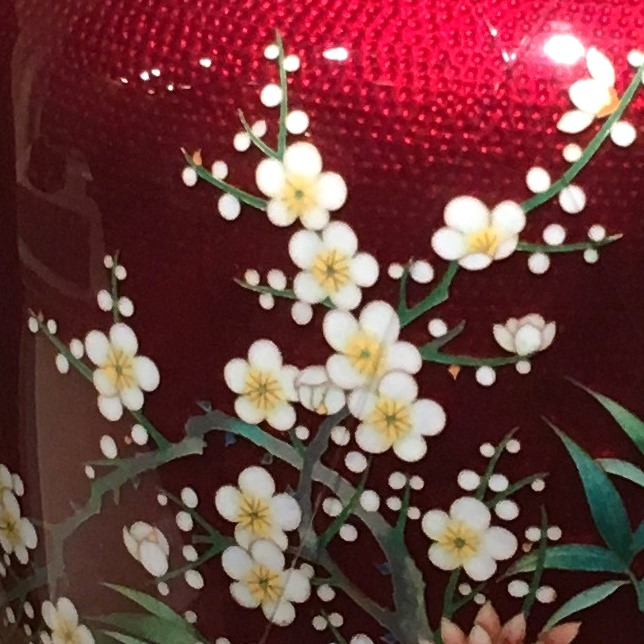
Tōmeiyū shippō

== See also ==
- Kin'unken, a cloisonné company in Kyoto
- Japanese craft
- List of Traditional Crafts of Japan
