= Philippe Malouin =

Anglo-Canadian designer (born 1982)

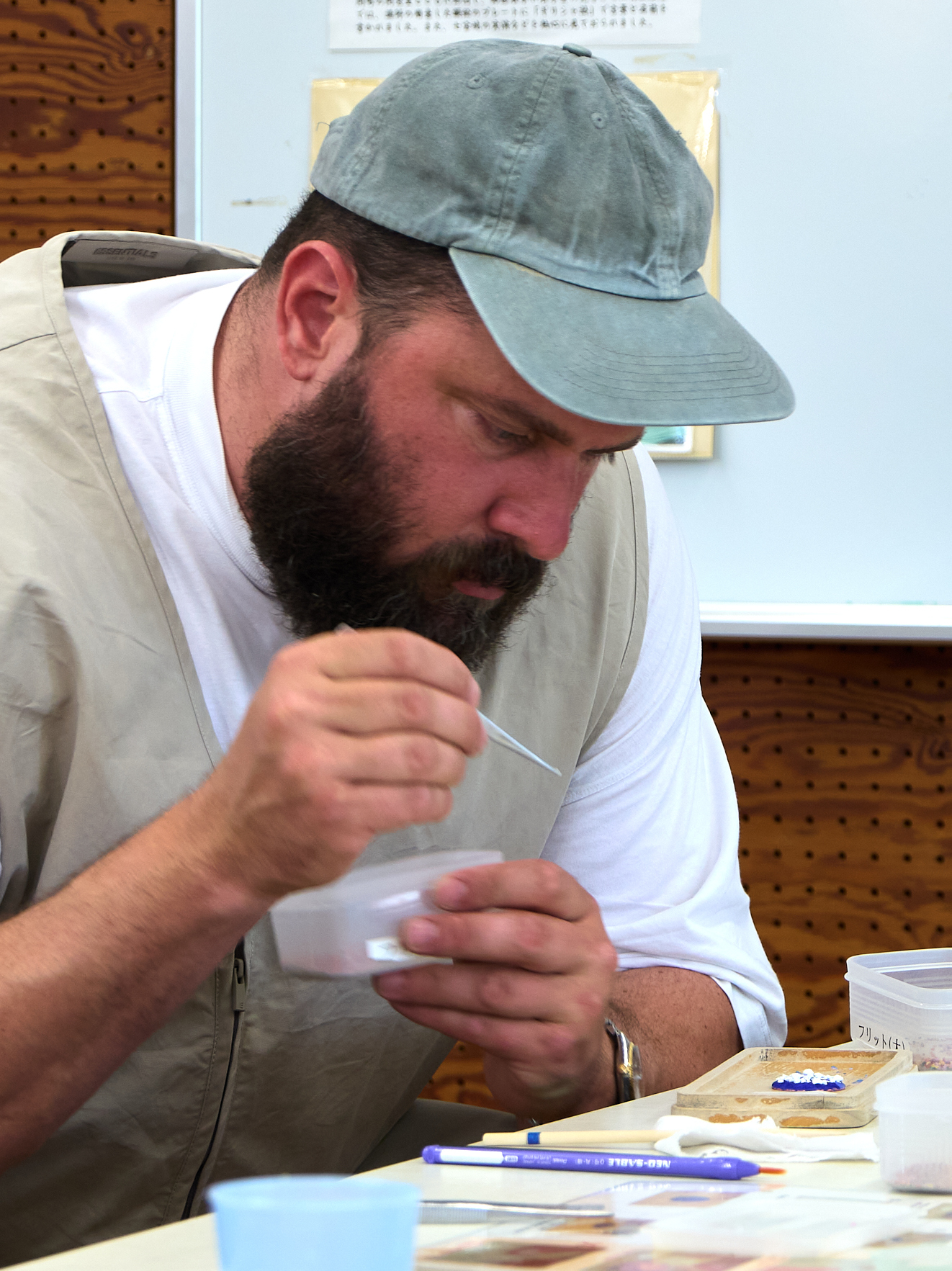
- Malouin in 2025
- Born: 1982 (age 43–44); Laval, Quebec, Canada
- Education: University of Montreal; École Nationale Supérieure de Création Industrielle; Design Academy Eindhoven
- Occupation: Designer
- Awards: Compasso d'Oro (2026)
- Website: philippemalouin.com

Philippe Malouin (born 1982) is a British-Canadian designer.

== Early life and education ==
Malouin was born in Laval, Quebec. He studied at the University of Montreal, École Nationale Supérieure de Création Industrielle in Paris, and the Design Academy Eindhoven. Malouin worked for Tom Dixon, and then opened his own studio in 2008. He lives and works in London.

== Work and career ==
Malouin has designed objects, lighting, and furniture for companies such as Alessi, Flos, SCP, and Zanotta,

His 2021 exhibition titled Steel Works presented pieces made from reworked salvaged steel components he found in junkyards in Brighton and Athens. He returned to the theme of salvage and recycling several years later with a group of expresso coffee pots designed for the Italian homewares company Alessi.

Malouin won Wallpaper* magazine's "Designer of the Year" award in 2018 as well as an award for best use of materials (he returned as a judge for the award the following year); W Hotels named him ''Designer of the Future" in 2012, and he was the president of the jury at Villa Noailles' Design Parade in France. In 2026 he was awarded a Compasso d'Oro for his Bilboquet light, which was described as "a Future-Proof Classic."

Bilboquet lamp by Malouin for Flos

His work has been widely exhibited and is in both private and public collections such as the Musée national des beaux-arts du Québec, the Triennale di Milano, and the Vitra Design Museum. In 2016 Malouin was part of the Friends+Design show at the Dresden Kunstgewerbemuseum. The exhibition was curated by Tulga Beyerle and Maria Cristina Didero, and featured works by designers including, Richard Hutten, Michael Young, and Bethan Laura Wood working together on specially commissioned pieces that "testify to the time, the affection and the trust that form the bond between ... very different people." In 2025 he was selected to participate in the Craft x Tech Tokai Project, the second edition of the Japanese cultural initiative. The project is an exploration of how traditional "aesthetic sensibilities embedded in Japanese craft can be reimagined through a thoughtful and skillful creative process" that, according to the programme's creative director "views craft not as a fixed tradition, but as a dynamic practice that continuously evolves over time." Malouin's contribution, a piece made by the Ando Cloisonné Company using the Owari Shippo technique was a group of intricately detailed modular containers titled Kasane .

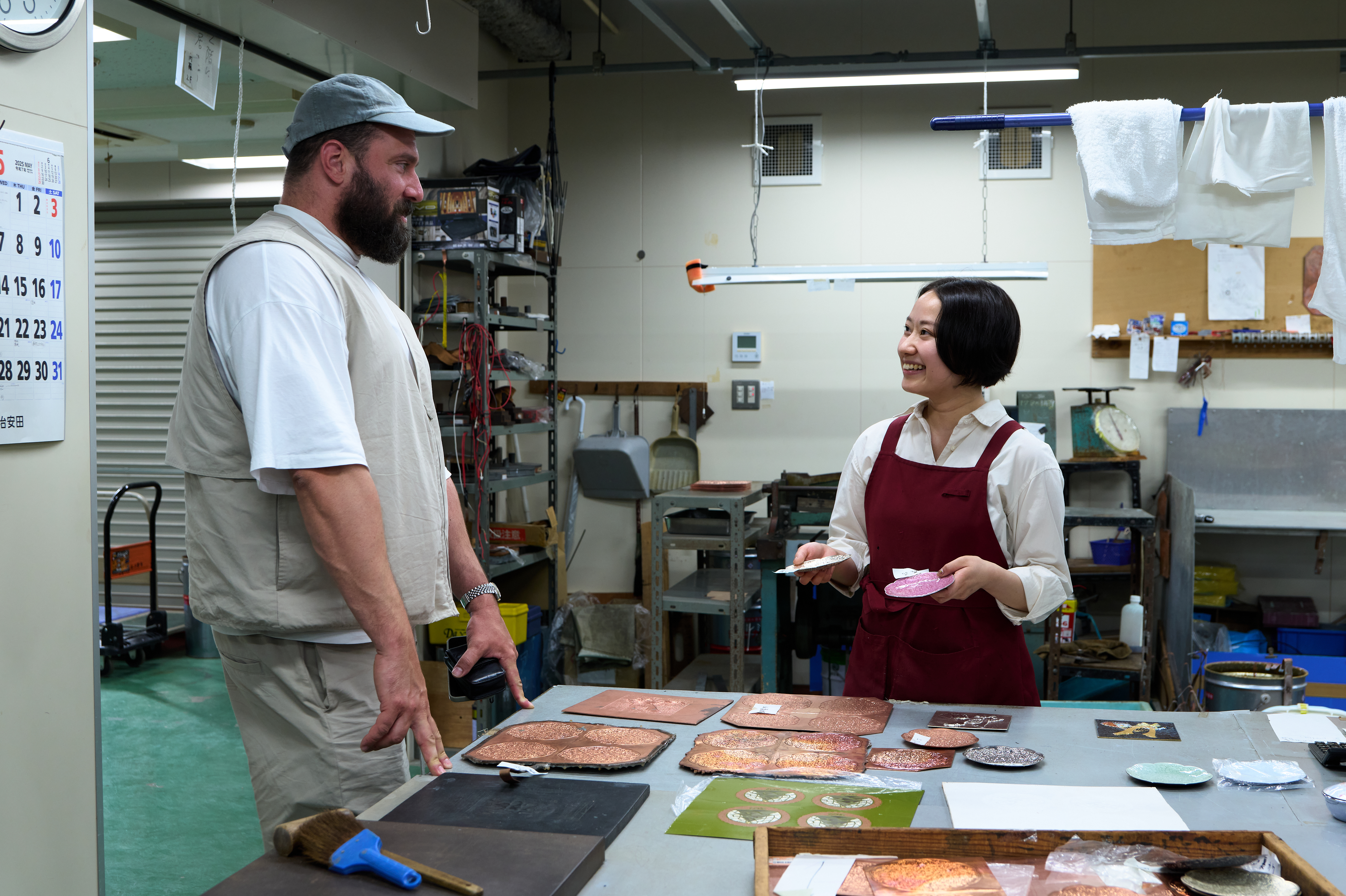
Malouin visits Ando cloisonné workshop, Nagoya, Japan, 2025

Malouin's Bilboquet desk lamp for Flos was awarded the Compasso d'Oro in 2026. Malouin has taught, lectured, and participated on award juries and academic panels at the RCA in London, ÉCAL in Lausanne, Switzerland, and the University of Tokyo, amongst other institutions.

== Publications ==
- Malouin, Philippe (2022). Steel Works. Nero. ISBN 978-88-8056-179-8.
