= André Fernand Thesmar =

French enameler (1843–1912)

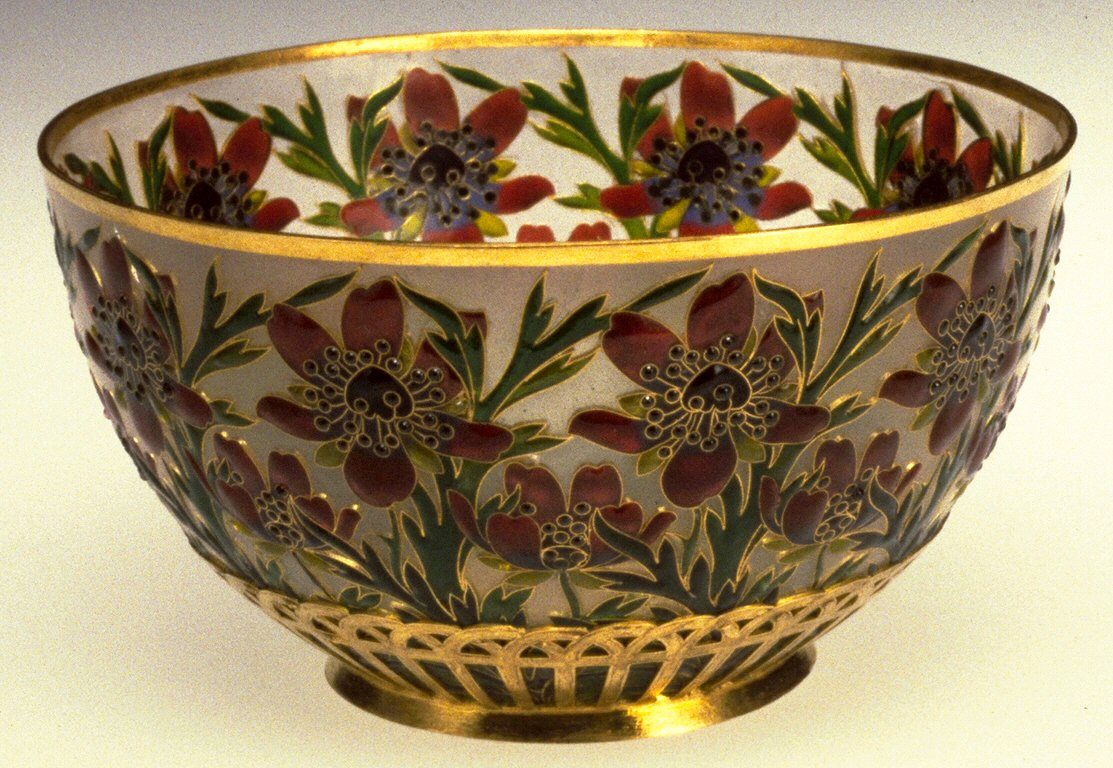
Cup with Poppies, 1903, Walters Art Museum

André Fernand Thesmar (2 March 1843 – 5 April 1912) was a French enameler. He is credited with bringing the style of soft-paste porcelain back into style, alongside sections with gold foil backings, in the 20th century. He also used the method of plique-à-jour, (French for "braid letting in daylight") including works that were often inspired by Japanese and Chinese enameling. This artistic work required great deal of expertise, skill and delicacy. He showed his work at the 1900 Paris Exposition Universelle. His work is found in the collections of the Walters Art Museum, the Hessian State Museum, and the Toledo Museum of Art.

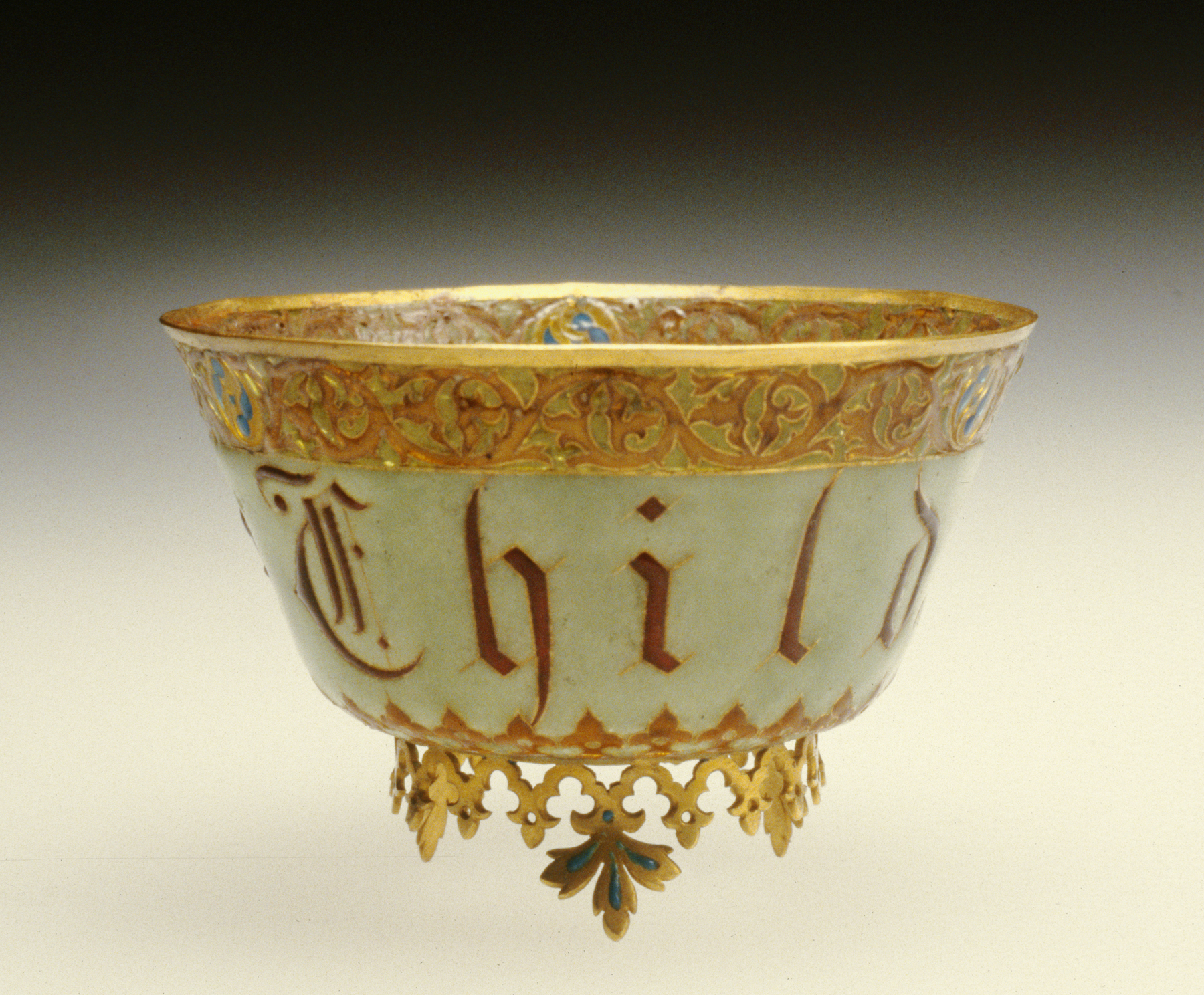
Memorial Cup, (circa 1892). The Walters Art Museum, Baltimore.

== Artistic Creations ==
The following are some of the works by André Fernand Thesmar.

1. Cup with Poppies (1903): Also known as Bowl of Anemones. Place of Origin is Neuilly-sur-Seine, France. It is a technical tour de force that requires glass enamels to be suspended within a filigree framework of gold or silver without a metal backing.
2. Memorial cup (circa 1892):
3. Japanese ornamental plate (circa 1872–1880): On a blue background, there are 3 birds on a small branch, surrounded by vegetation and a butterfly, created in a Japanese style.
4. Cornflower bowl (circa 1891): Made with cloisonné enamel.
5. Fuchsia vase (circa 1907): Made of an attractive milky white color, it has translucent enamel set in gold cloisonné.
