= Buddhist art in Japan =

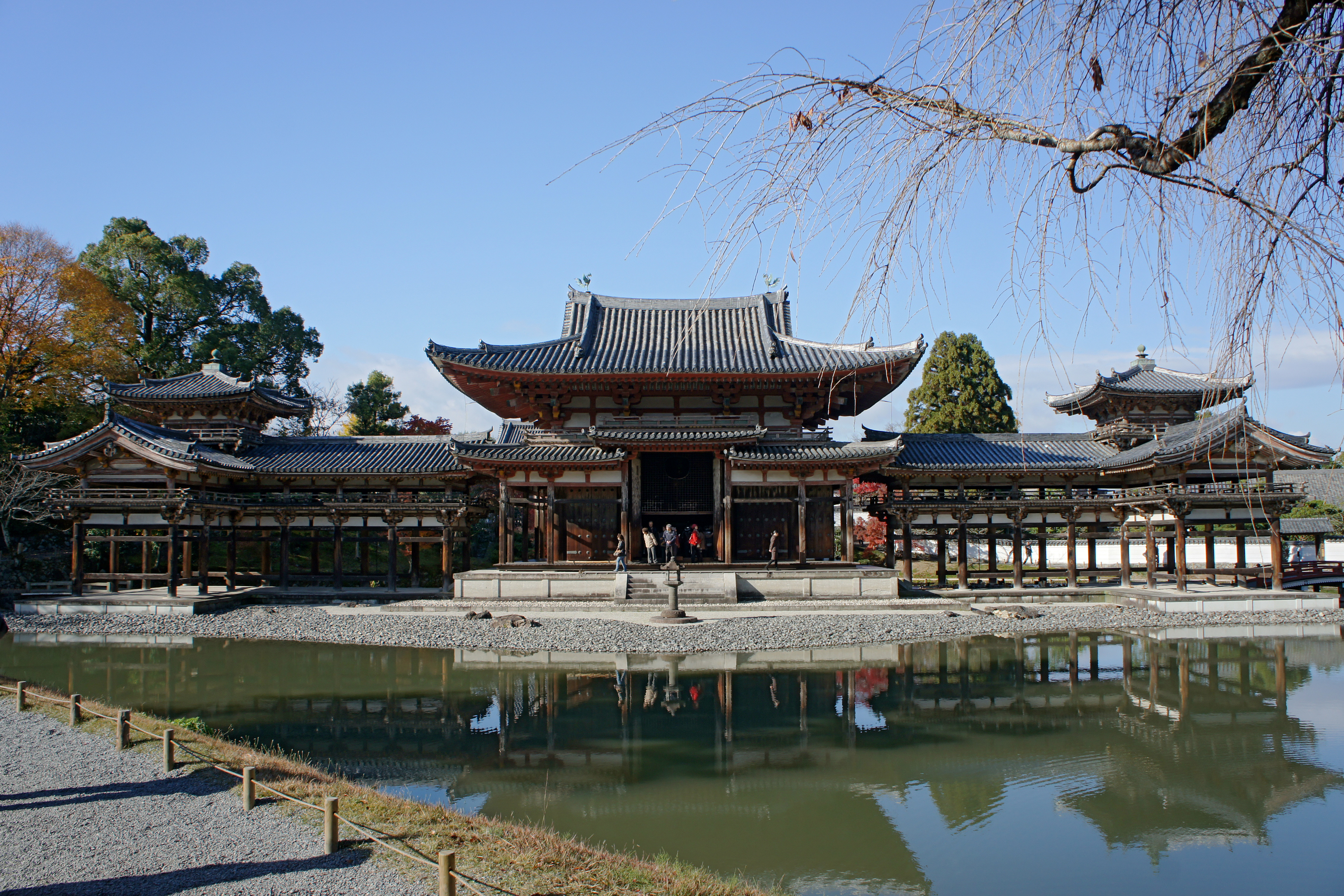
The Phoenix Hall of Byōdō-in. This architecture in "Japanese" (和様, wayō) that is Japanese original design. It was built in 1059.It was registered as part of the UNESCO World Heritage Site "Historic Monuments of Ancient Kyoto".

Buddhism played an important role in the development of Japanese art between the 6th and the 16th centuries. Buddhist art and Buddhist religious thought came to Japan from China through Korea. Buddhist art was encouraged by Crown Prince Shōtoku in the Suiko period in the sixth century, and by Emperor Shōmu in the Nara period in the eighth century. In the early Heian period, Buddhist art and architecture greatly influenced the traditional Shinto arts, and Buddhist painting became fashionable among wealthy Japanese. The Kamakura period saw a flowering of Japanese Buddhist sculpture, whose origins are in the works of Heian period sculptor Jōchō. During this period, outstanding busshi (sculptors of Buddhist statues) appeared one after another in the Kei school, and Unkei, Kaikei, and Tankei were especially famous. The Amida sect of Buddhism provided the basis for many popular artworks. Buddhist art became popular among the masses via scroll paintings, paintings used in worship and paintings of Buddhas, saint's lives, hells and other religious themes. Under the Zen sect of Buddhism, portraiture of priests such as Bodhidharma became popular as well as scroll calligraphy and sumi-e brush painting.

== Asuka period ==
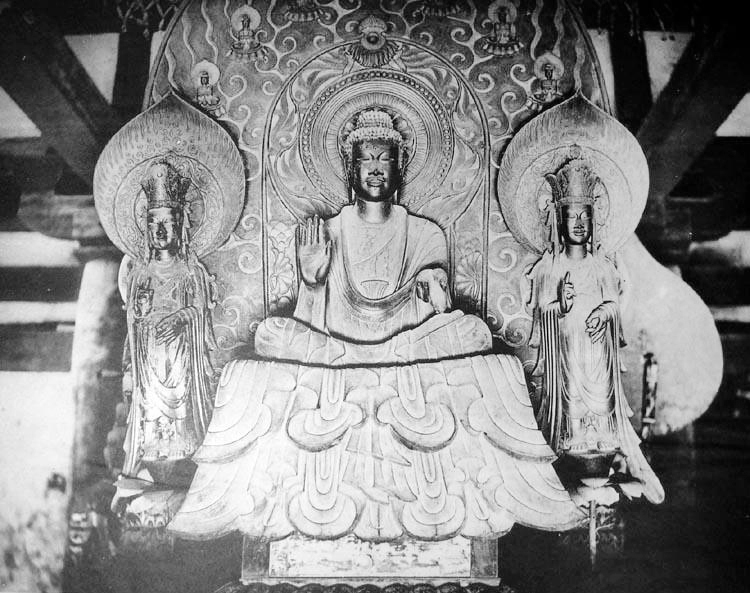
Shakyamuni Triad by Tori Busshi depicts the Buddha Shakyamuni in the traditional sixth-century Chinese style with an elongated head and in front of a flaming mandorla – a lotus petal shaped cloud.

The dates for the Asuka period are debated, however it is agreed upon that the period extends from mid 500s to early 700s AD. This period is marked by an emphasis on political and cultural relationships with Korea. The Asuka period (552–645) saw the gradual growth of Chinese and Korean artistic and religious influences on Japanese culture. Buddhist texts, implements of worship, and iconography were presented to Japan by Emperor Kimmei in 538 or 552 AD. However, it is likely that more casual introductions had already been made. It was during this period that Buddhism was established as the state religion. The Asuka period is characterized as the foundation for individualistic and public forms of Buddhist art. Specifically, during this period depictions of Buddha are rendered through key iconography such as a lotus, swirled hair, a third eye, mudras, and mandorlas. The sculpture of this period shows, as do most all subsequent sculpture, the influence of continental art. Tori Busshi a descendant of a Chinese immigrant followed the style of Northern Wei sculpture and established what has come to be known as the Tori school of sculpture. Notable examples of Tori works are the Sakyamuni Triad (or Shaka triad) which are the main icons of the Golden Hall of Hōryū-ji temple and the kannon Boddhisatva of Yumedono Hall of the same temple, also known as Guze Kannon. First built in the early 7th century as the private temple of Crown Prince Shōtoku, Hōryū-ji consists of 41 independent buildings. The most important ones, the main worship hall, or Kondō (Golden Hall), and Gojū-no-tō (Five-story Pagoda), stand in the center of an open area surrounded by a roofed cloister. Inside the Kondō, on a large rectangular platform, are some of the most important sculptures of the period including the Sakyamuni triad. In the Sakyamuni Triad, Sakyamuni, the center Buddha, is attended by two other figures, Bhaisajyaguru to its right and Amitābha to its left. The statues are dated to 623. The style of the statue is characterized by the two-dimensionality of the figure and the repetitive pattern-like depictions of the cloth the triad sits upon. This style is incredibly typical of the Asuka period. Key works include: the Shaka Triad, Yakushi Triad, Kannon, and Tamamushi Shrine.

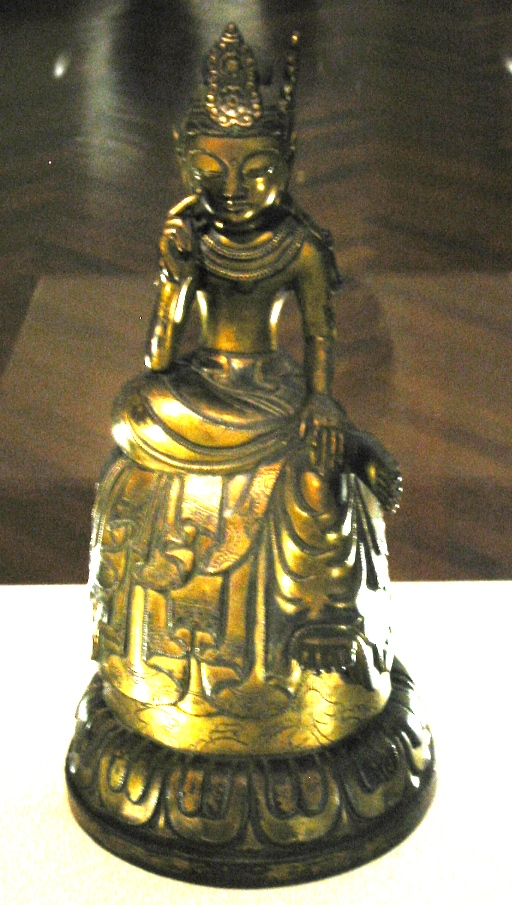
Bodhisattva, Asuka period, 7th century. Tokyo National Museum.

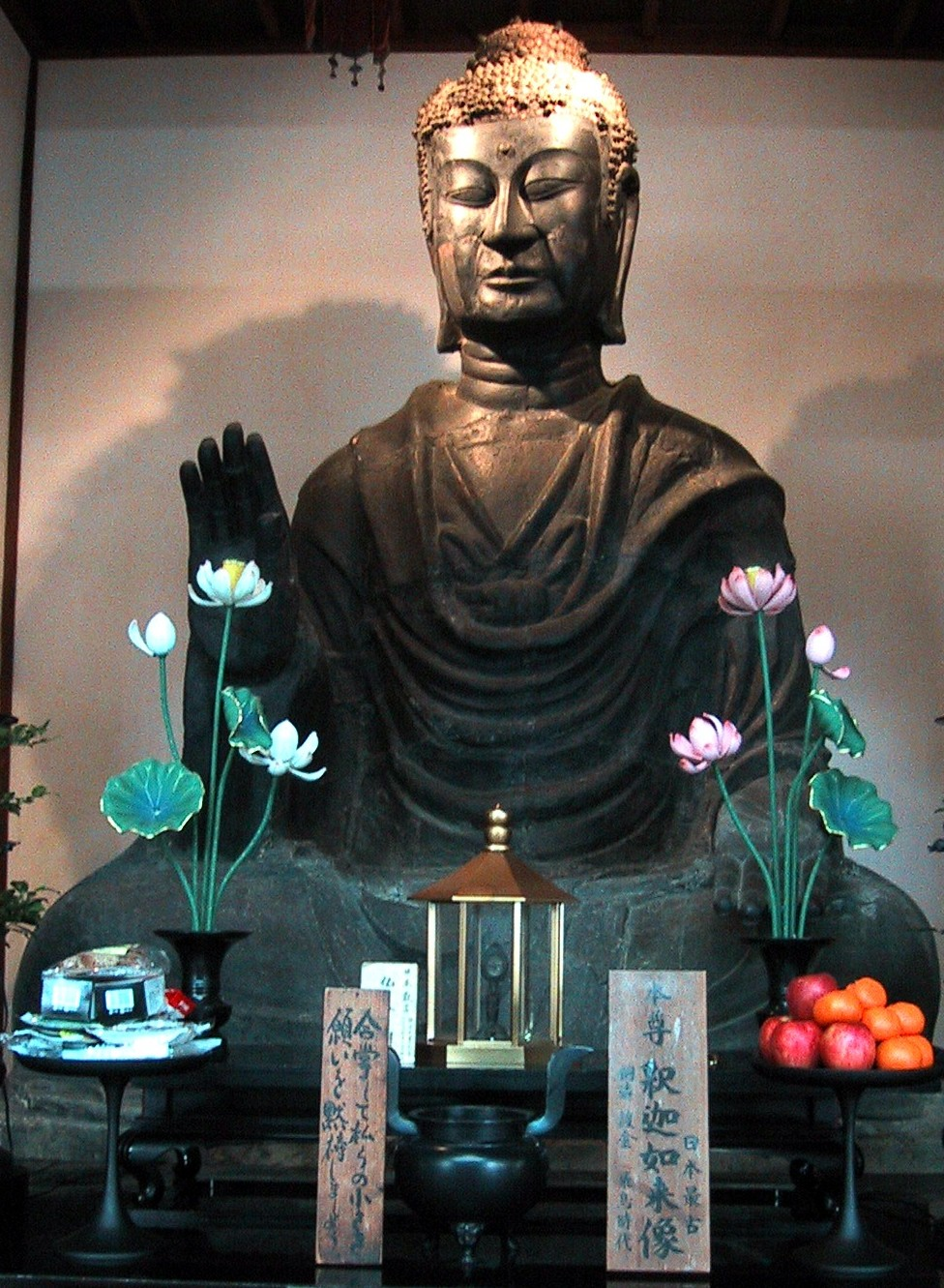
The Shakyamuni Daibutsu Bronze (4.8 metres) is the oldest known sculpture of Buddha in Japan cast by Tori Busshi in 609.

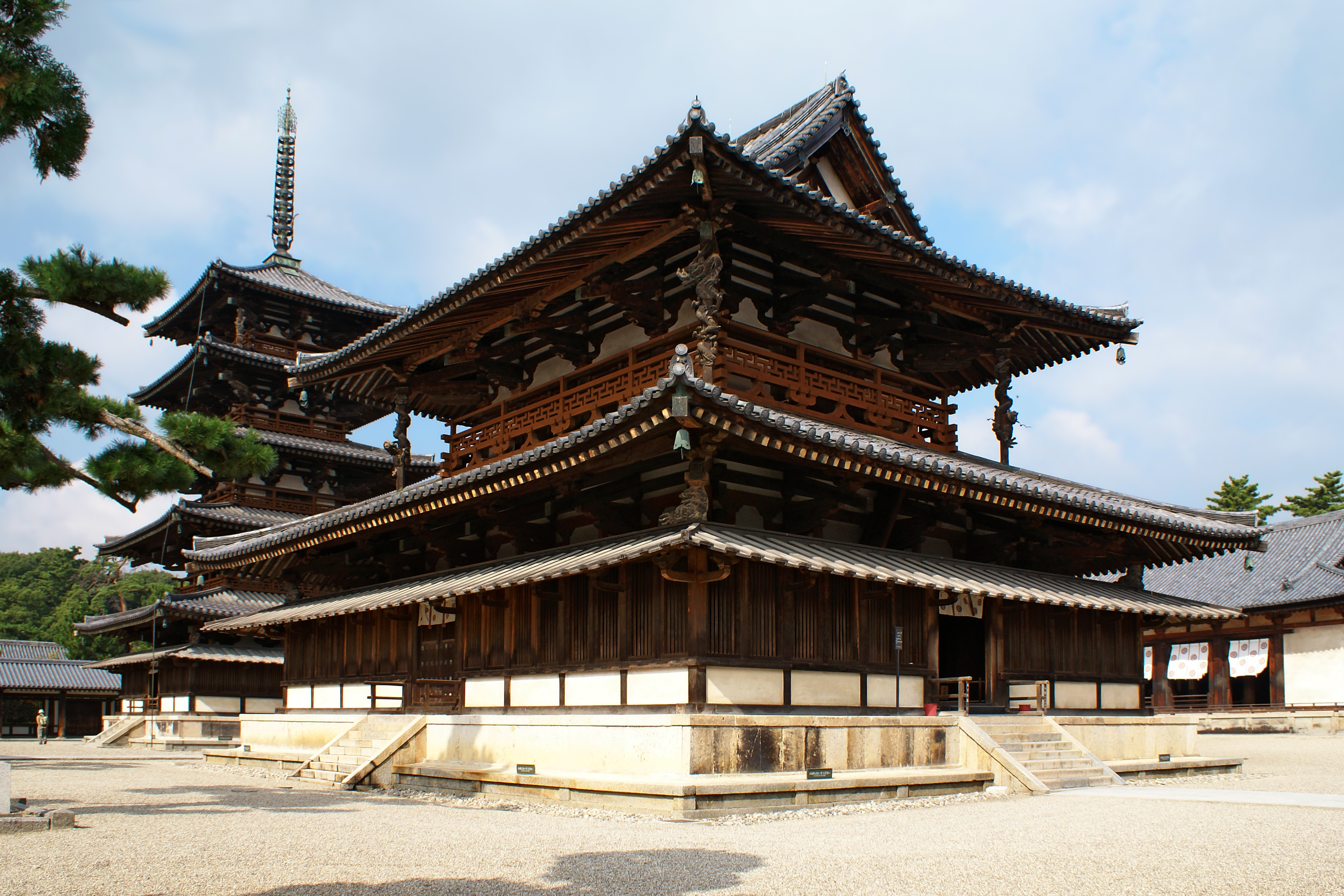
Golden Hall of Hōryū-ji

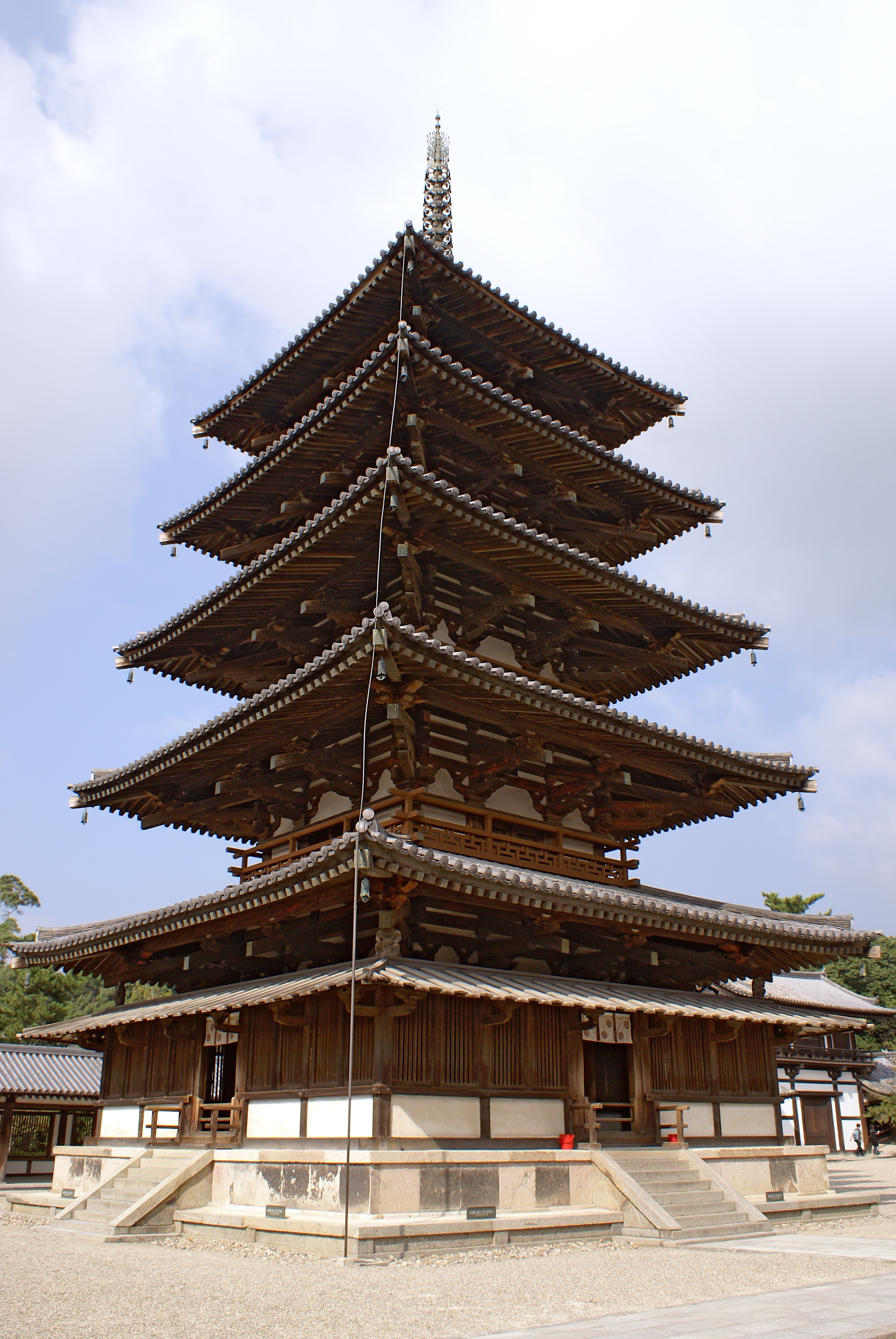
Five-storied Pagoda of Hōryū-ji

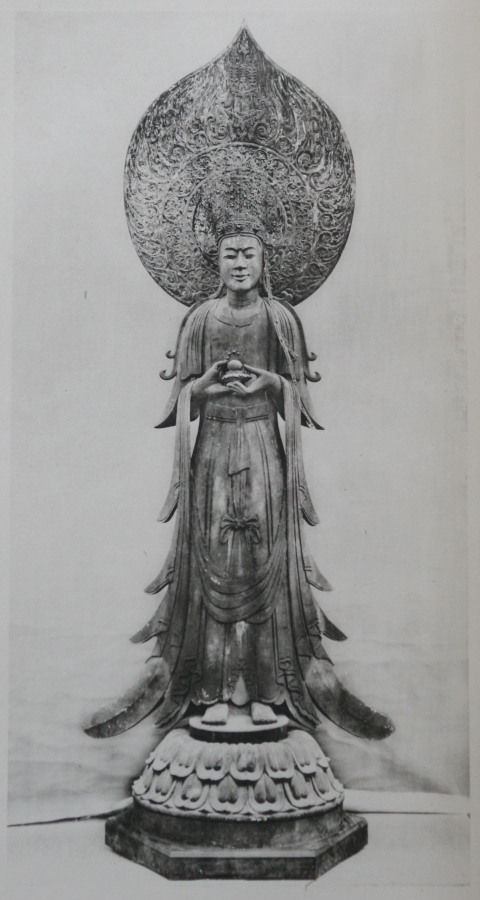
Kannon(Avalokitesvara) or Guze Kannon, wood plated with gold, crown: bronze openwork gilt. Early CE 7th century, Horyu-ji, Nara

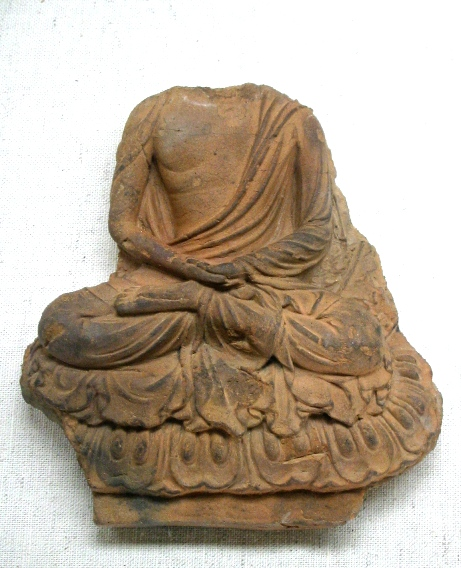
Tile with seated Buddha

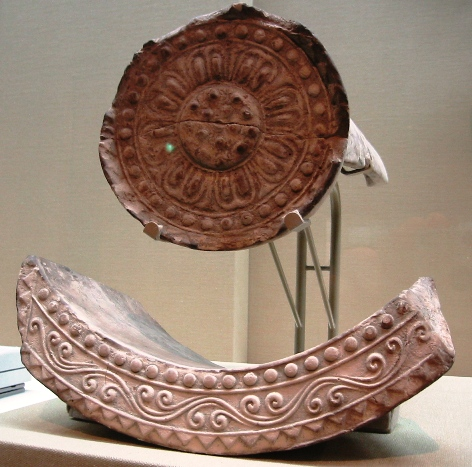
7th century Nara temple roof tile showing Greco-Buddhist influence

== Nara period ==
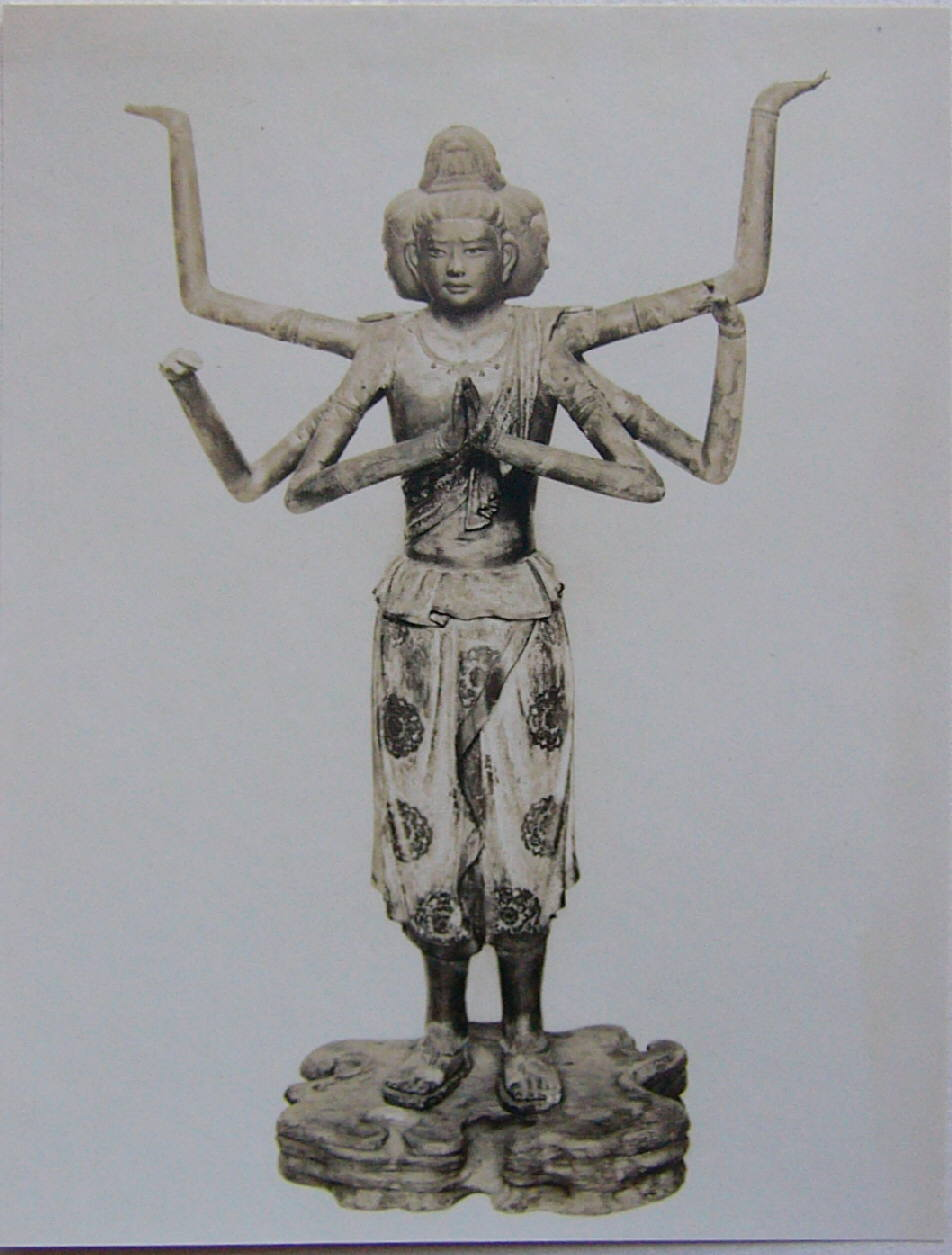
Asura. 734, Kofuku-ji in Nara

The dates for the Nara period are thought to be around 710–784. The beginning of this period is marked by the relocation of Japan's capital to Nara. It was during this period that Japanese society took on a more hierarchical structure with all power proceeding the emperor. In addition there was a merging of Buddhism and state which led to the commission of large scale temple complexes with monuments such as pagodas. In terms of sculpture, this period marked the adoption of the hollow- core dry lacquer technique – it has been suggested that this technique was used in an effort to reduce the use of bronze. Rather than merely depicting Buddha and bodhisattvas, renderings of deities and guardian figures begin to appear with individualistic and expressive features. The Early Nara period saw a move towards more naturalistic styles emerging from China. The Triad of Yakushi shows the healing Buddha which presides over the Eastern Pure Land attended by two Bodhisattvas Nikko and Gakko. The triad, housed in the Yakushiji temple (7th century in Nara), reveals Chinese and central Asian influences in its anatomical definition, naturalism and realistic drapery. The technique known as hompa-shiki was a new way to render drapery in a more solid and fleshy form. This technique later rose in popularity during the Heian period. The end of the nara period is marked by a stylistic shift in sculpture. In terms of painting, Buddhist works emulated the Chinese Tang style, which was characterized by elongated and rounded figures and broad brush strokes.

Temple building in the 8th century was focused around the Tōdai-ji in Nara. Constructed as the headquarters for a network of temples in each of the provinces, the Tōdaiji is the most ambitious religious complex erected in the early centuries of Buddhist worship in Japan. Appropriately, the 16.2 m (53 ft) Buddha (completed 752) enshrined in the main Buddha hall, or Daibutsuden, is a Rushana Buddha, the figure that represents the essence of Buddhahood, just as the Tōdaiji represented the center for Imperially sponsored Buddhism and its dissemination throughout Japan. Only a few fragments of the original statue survive, and the present hall and central Buddha are reconstructions from the Edo period. Under the Ritsuryō system of government in the Nara period, Buddhism was heavily regulated by the state through the Sōgō (僧綱, Office of Priestly Affairs). During this time, Tōdai-ji served as the central administrative temple for the provincial temples for the six Buddhist schools in Japan at the time. Key works include: Todai Temple Complex with statue of the Great Buddha and Great Buddha Hall and Kofuku Temple.

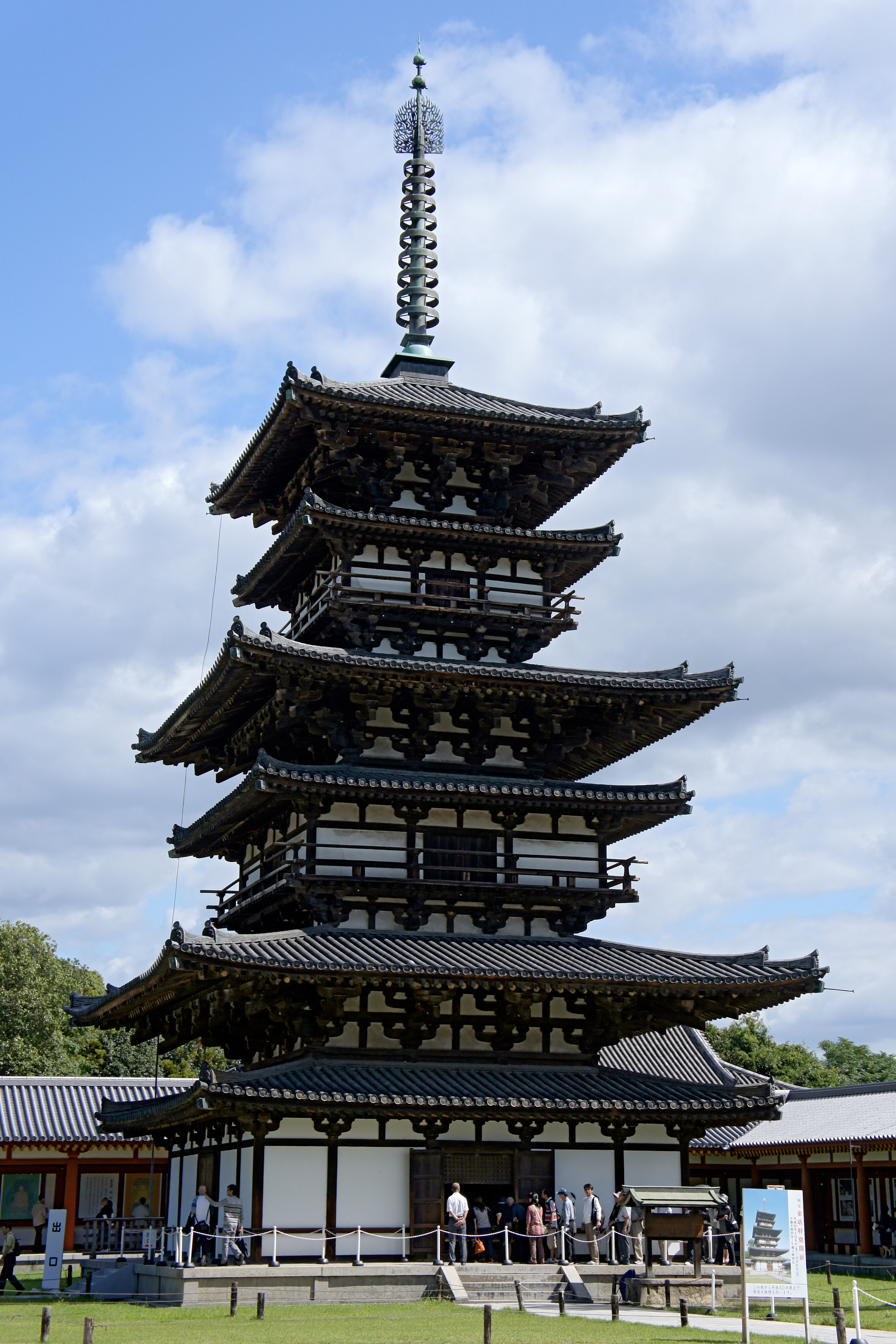
Yakushi-ji's East Pagoda built in the Nara period of the 8th century

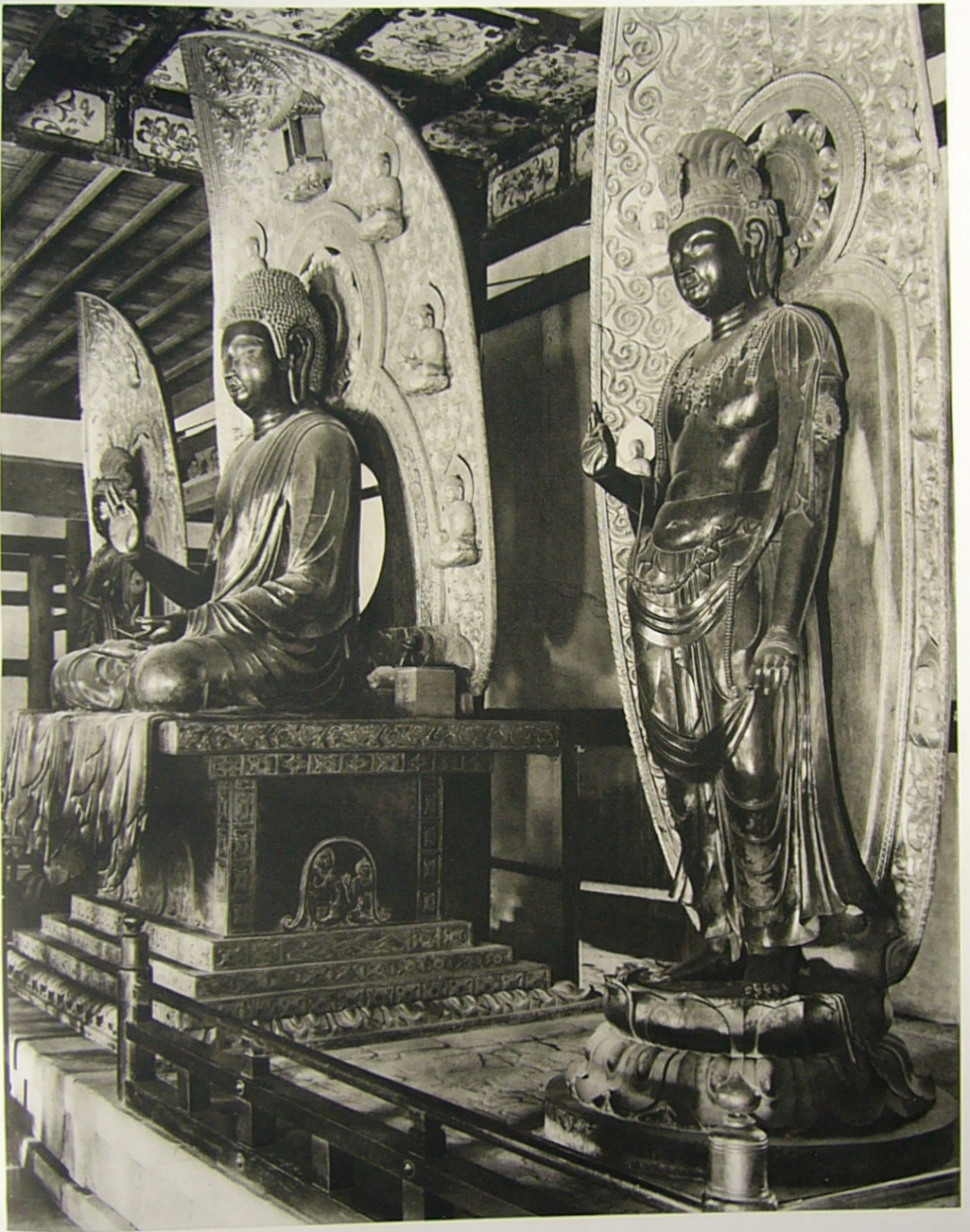
Triad of Yakushi at Yakushi-ji

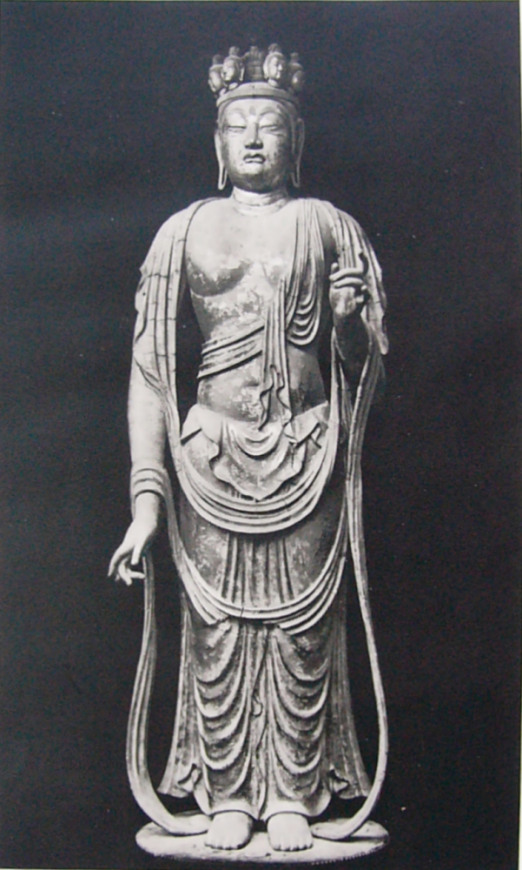
Jūichimen kannon. 8th century, Shōrin-ji in Nara

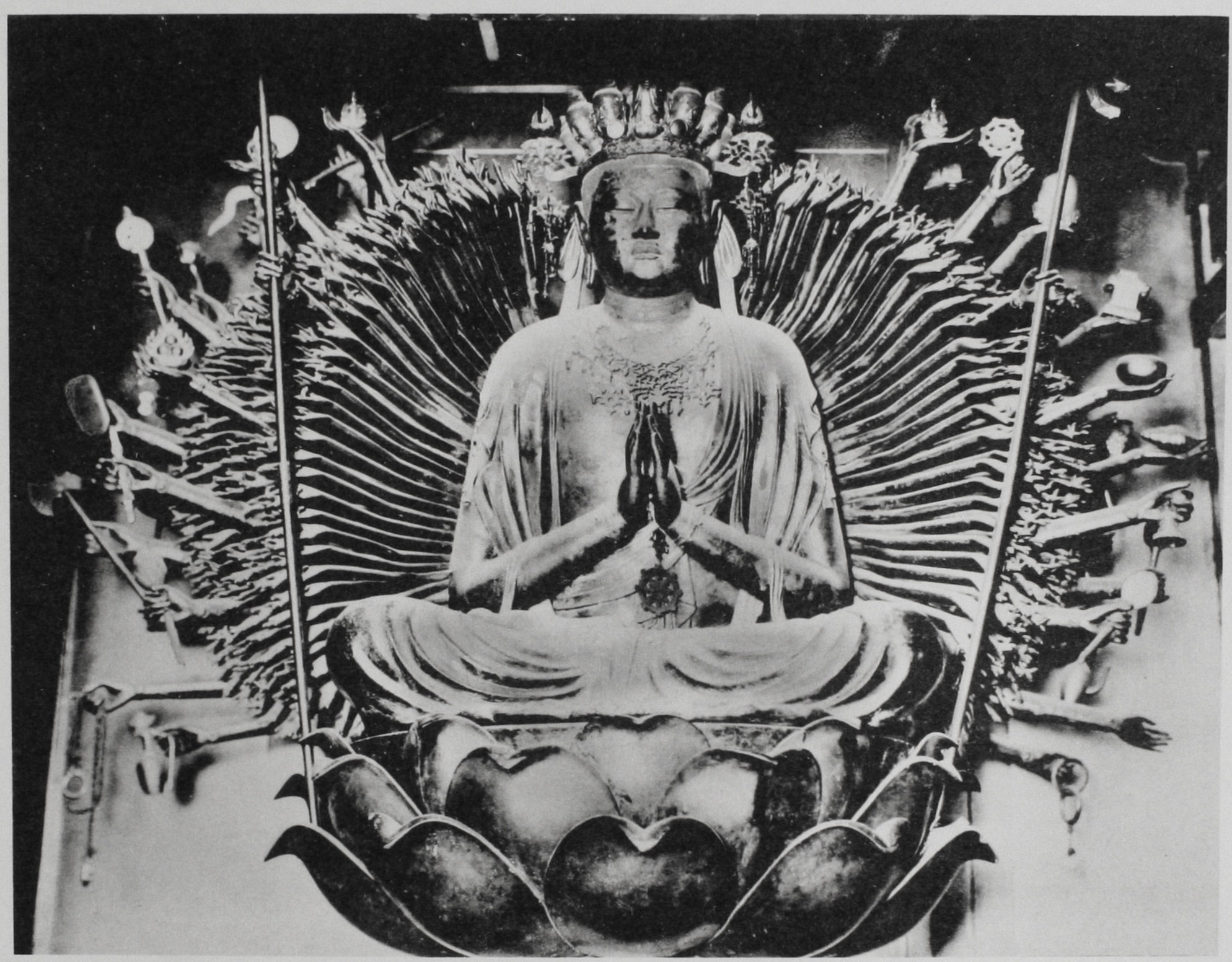
Senju Kannon of Fujii-dera in Osaka

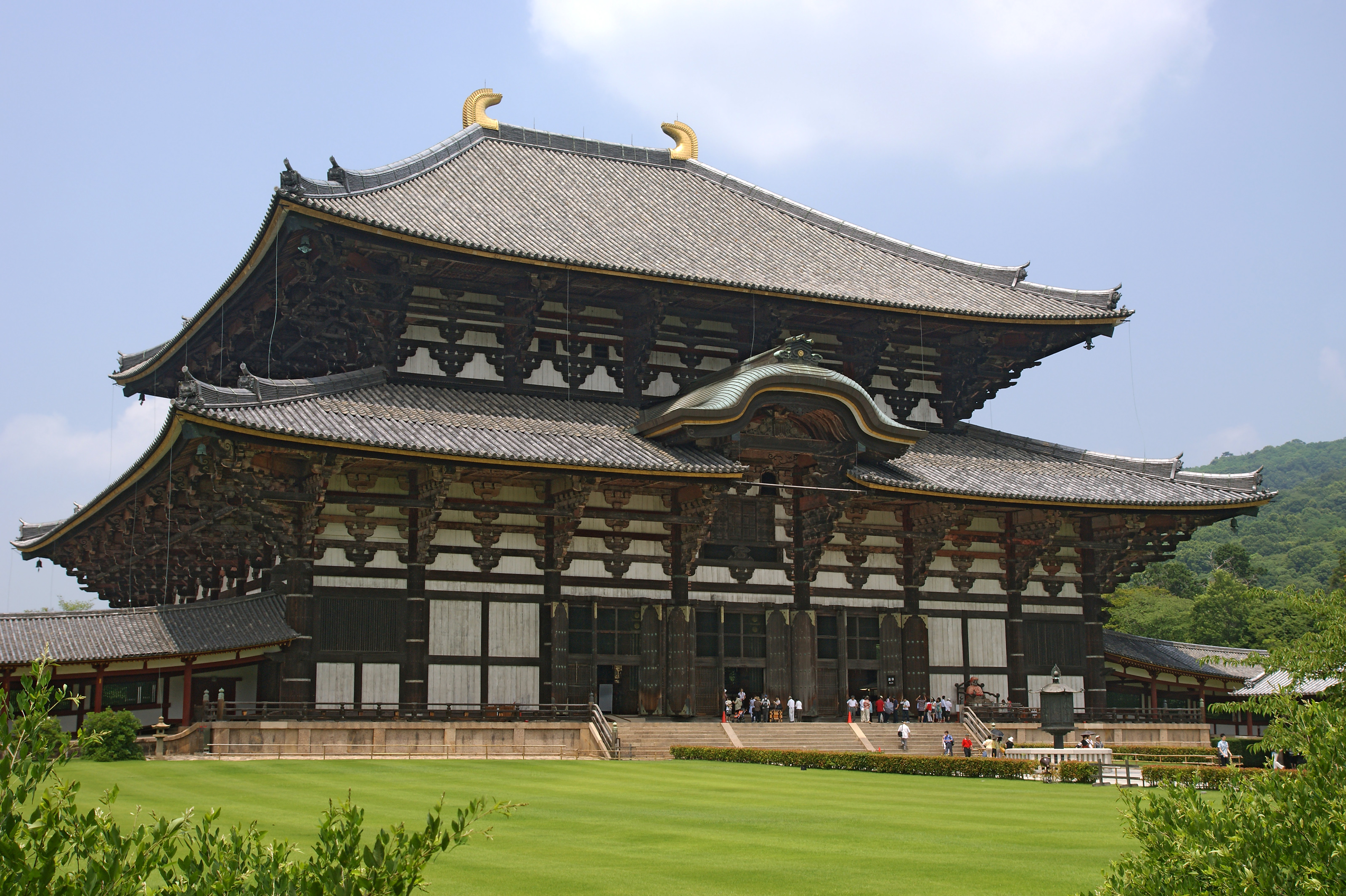
Great Buddha hall of Tōdai-ji in Nara

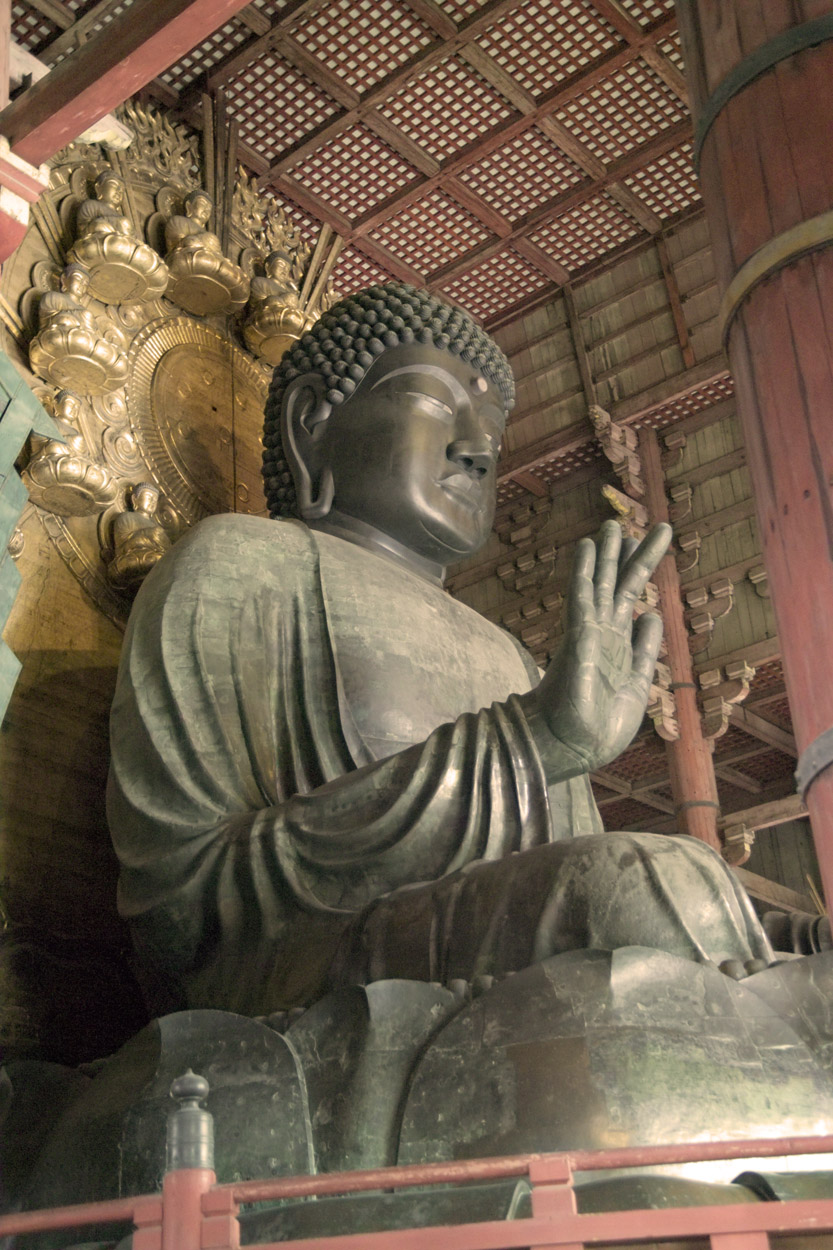
Great Buddha of Tōdai-ji in Nara

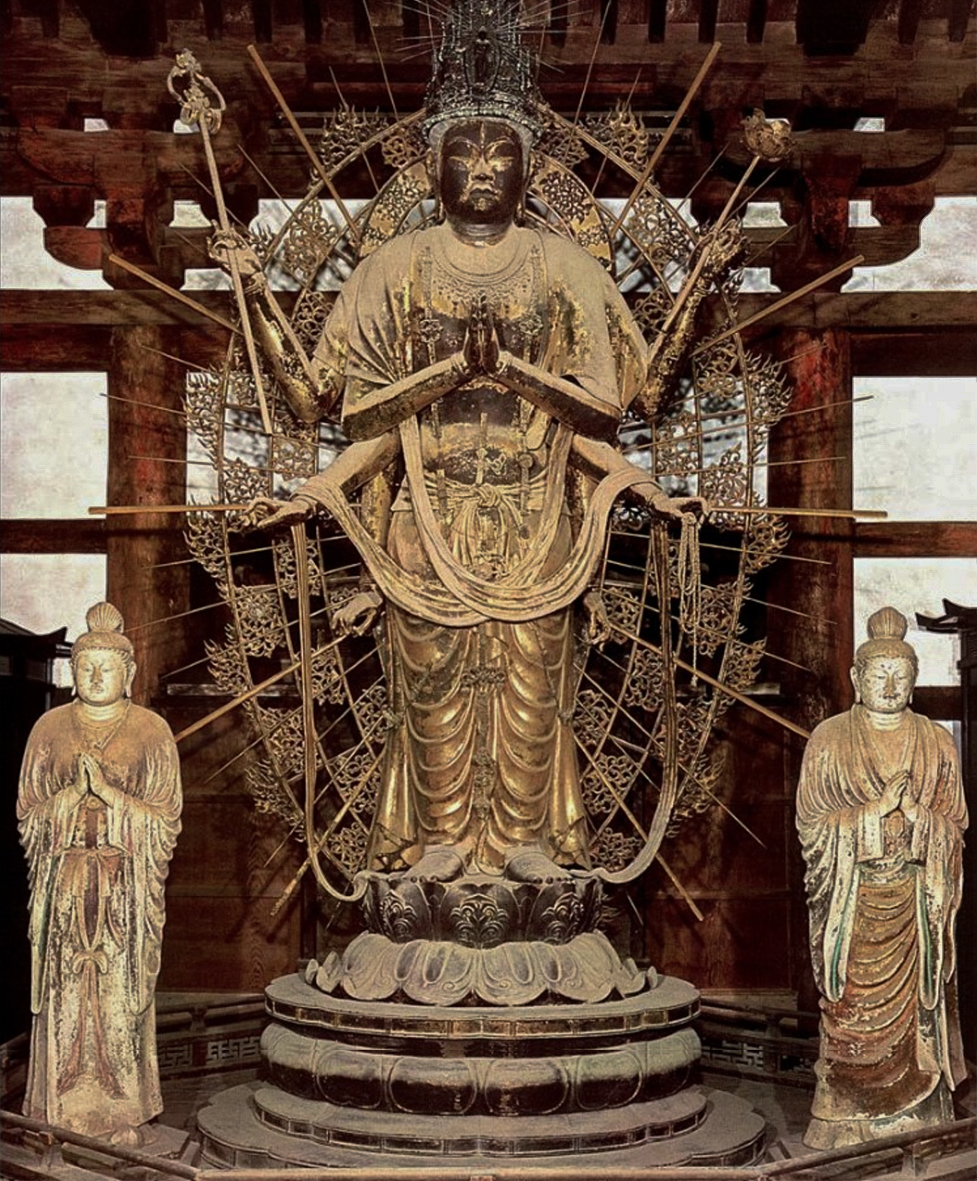
Fukū-kensaku Kannon of Hokke-do. Tōdai-ji in Nara

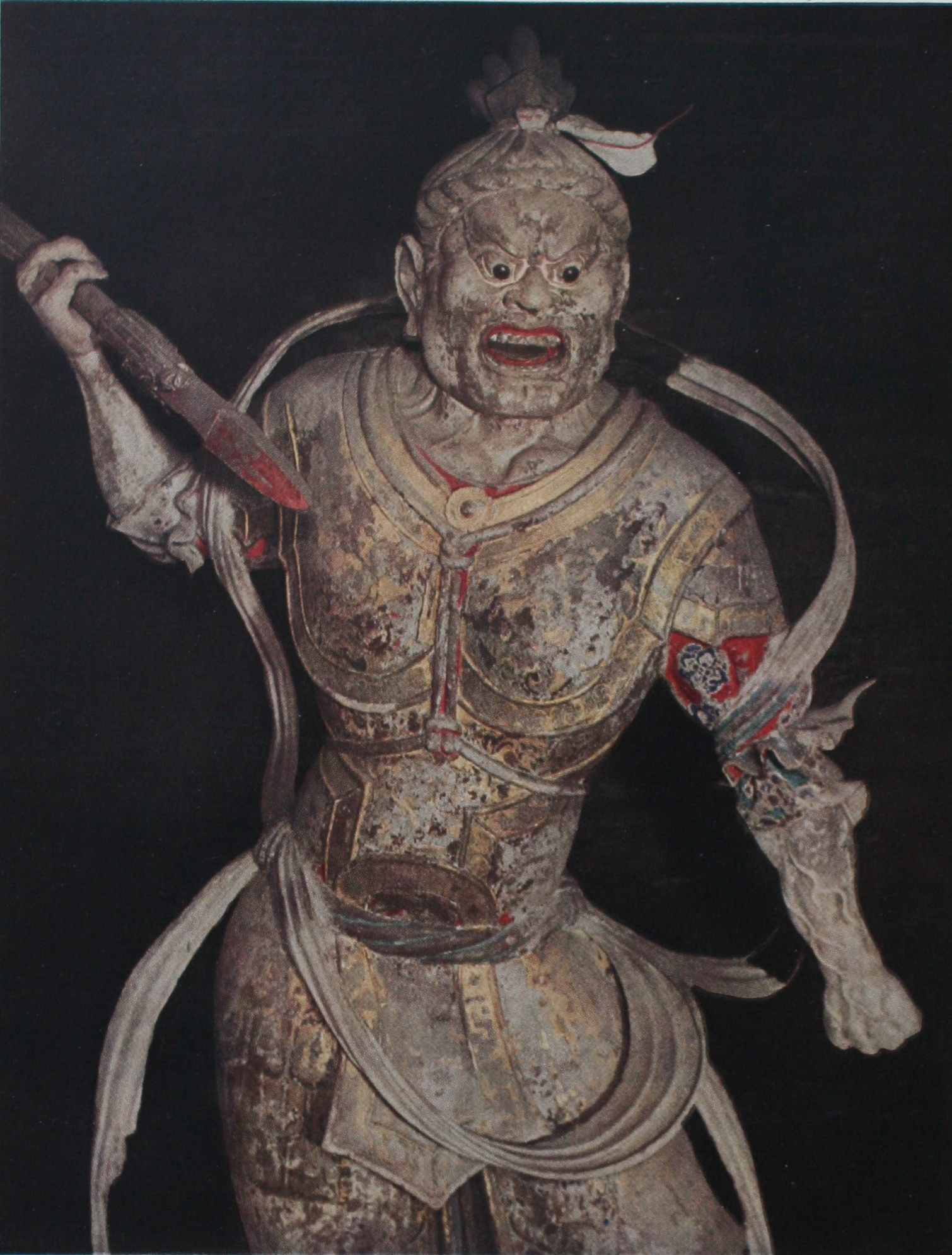
Shukongoshin. Tōdai-ji in Nara

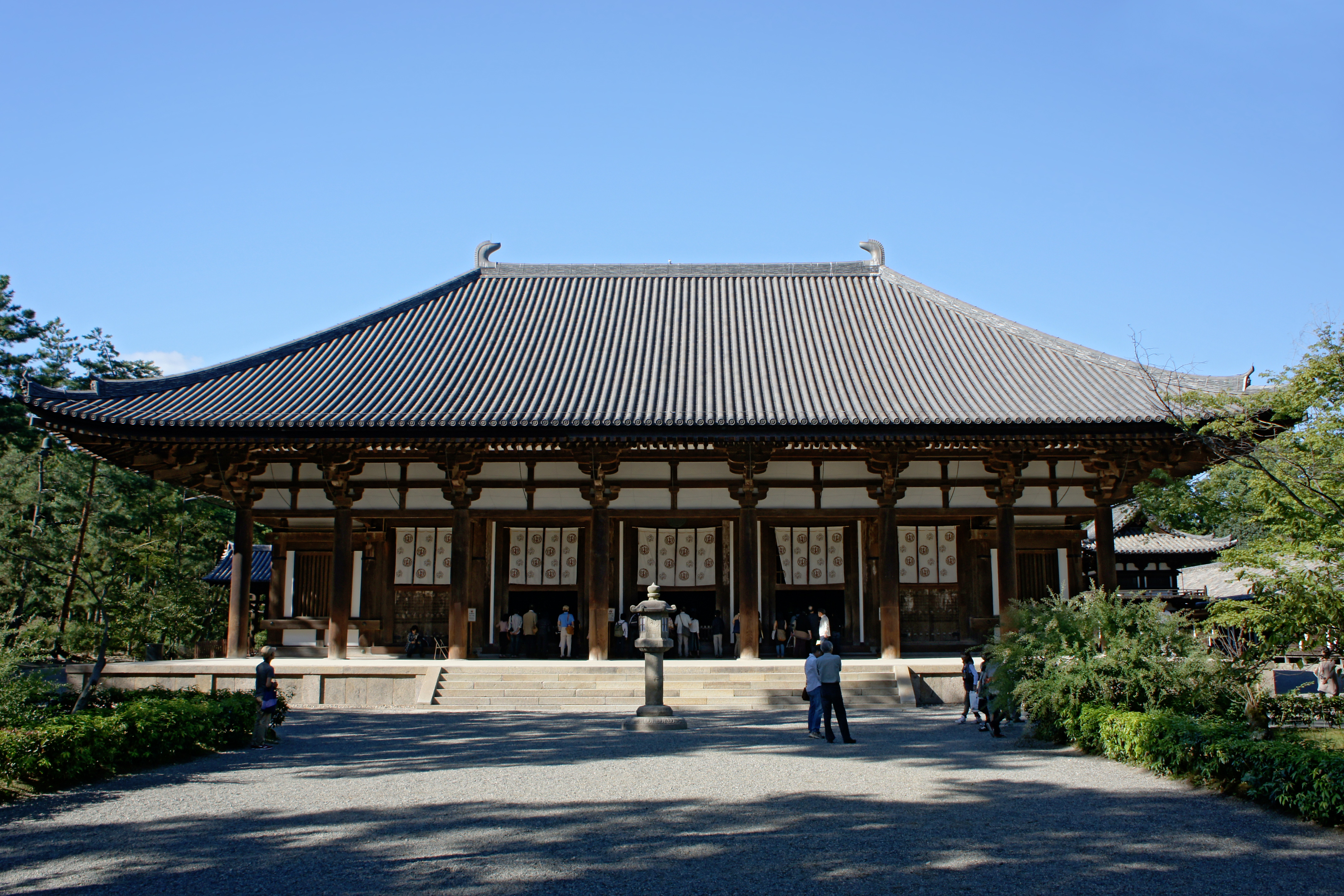
Golden Hall of Tōshōdai-ji in Nara

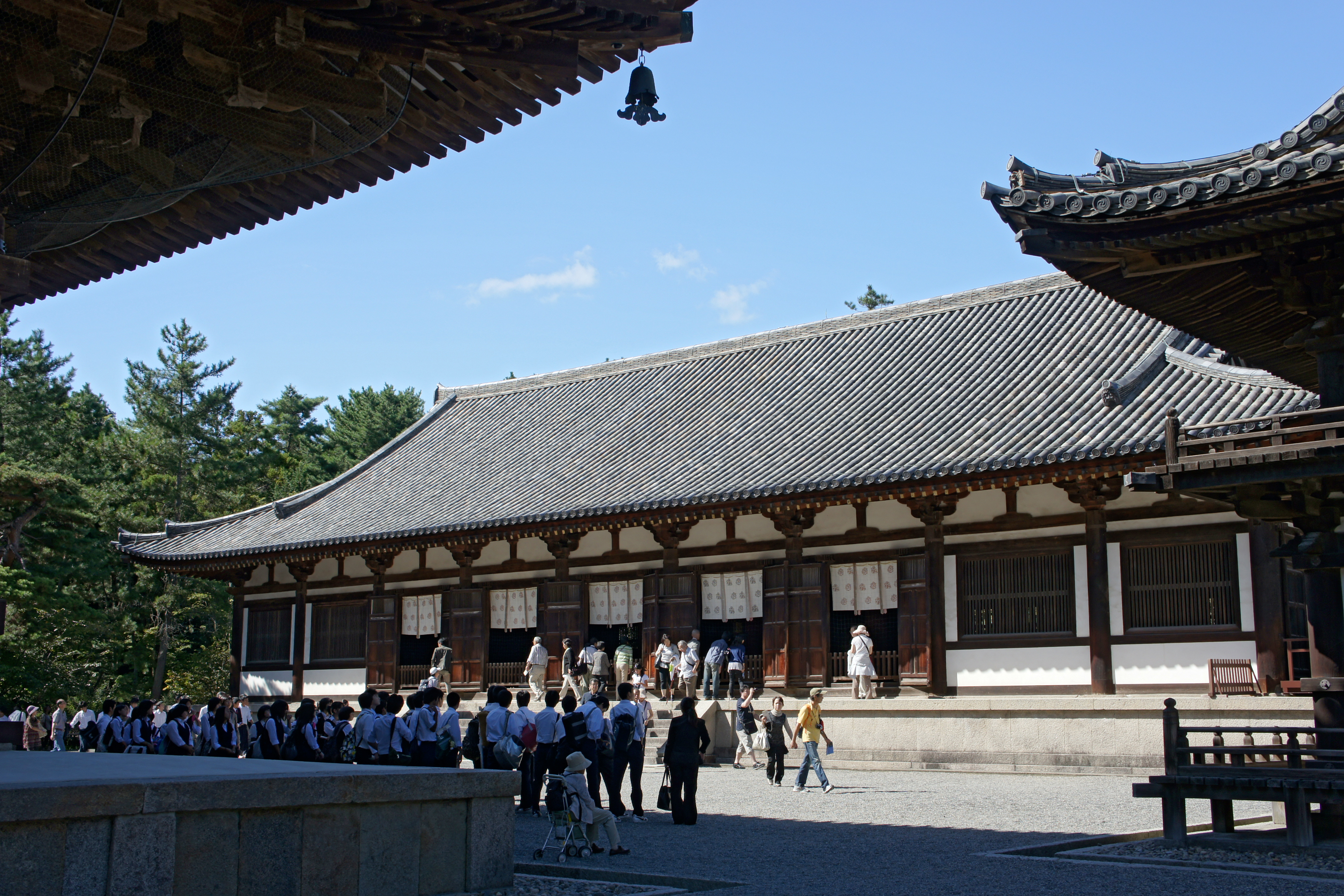
Lecture Hall of Tōshōdai-ji in Nara

== Heian period (794–1184) ==
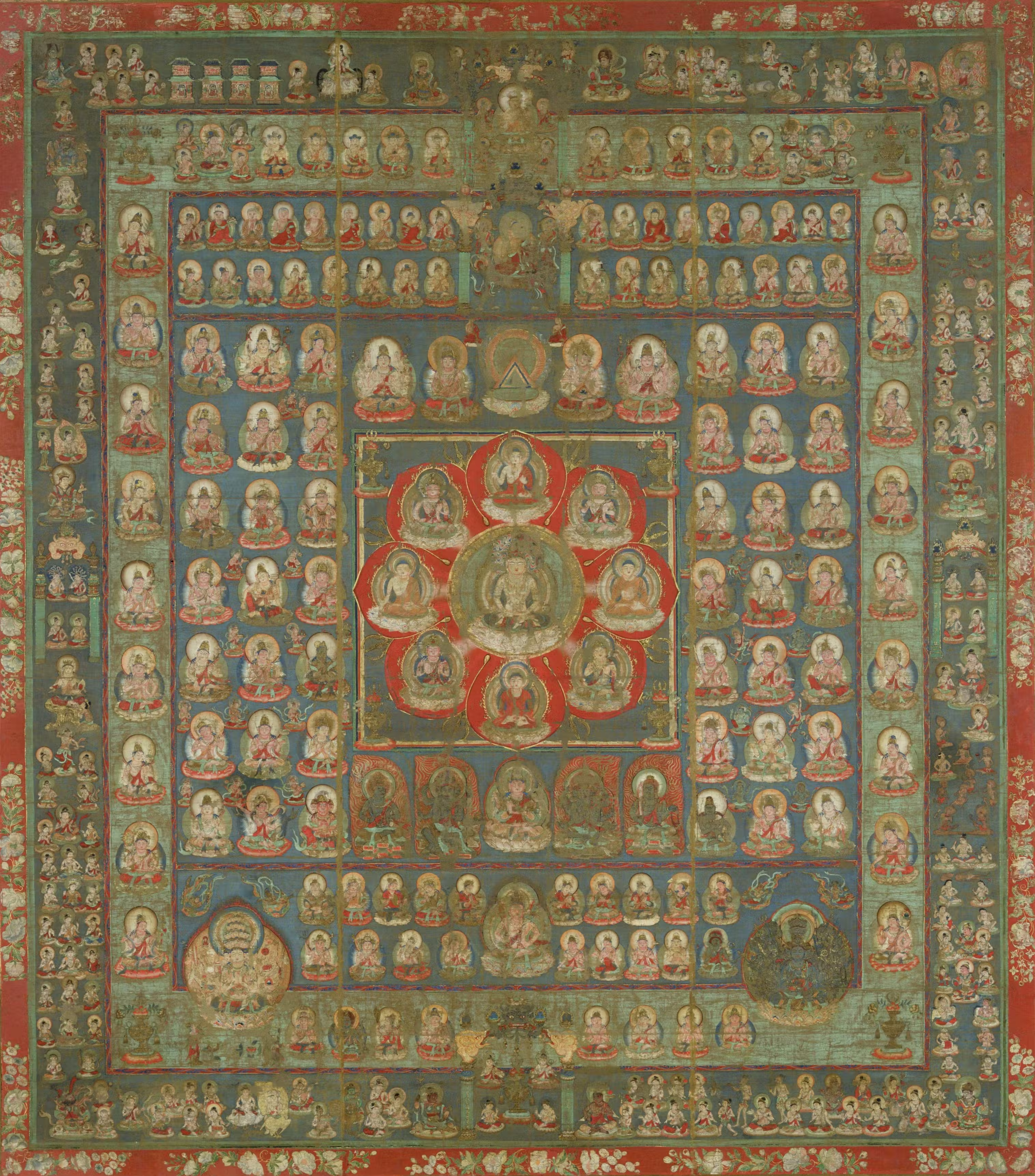
Taizokai (Womb World) mandala, second half of ninth century. Hanging scroll, color on silk. The center square represents the young stage of Vairocana Buddha.

The dates for the Heian period are believed to be 794–1184 AD. In 784 the Emperor Kanmu, threatened by the growing secular power of the Buddhist institutions in Nara, moved the capital to Heian-kyō (Kyōto). This remained the imperial capital for the next 1,000 years. The term Heian period refers to the years between 794 and 1185, when the Kamakura shogunate was established at the end of the Genpei War. The period is further divided into the early Heian and the late Heian, or Fujiwara era, the pivotal date being 894. In 894, the imperial embassies to China were officially discontinued. In addition, this period is marked by the deviation from Chinese artistic models and the development of art specific to Japanese concerns. This art was highly supported by noble commissions. However, there were great social and political changes occurring during the Heian period, and it is necessary to look at Buddhist art in this context.

Buddhism underwent changes as a new form of Buddhism rose in popularity: Amidism. This branch held that nirvana and entry to the Pure Land could be earned through a recitation before death and merit. There was also a new found emphasis on creating an adequate worship space. It was thought that the creation of these spaces and commissions would result in strong karma. A commonly commissioned work was the mandala, a roadmap of sorts to the cosmos. Mandalas came in twos, one rendering the phenomenal world while the other rendered the womb world. It was a common practice to meditate before the mandalas and to use them as a religious tool.

Jōchō is said to be one of the greatest Buddhist sculptors not only in this period but also in the history of Buddhist statues in Japan. Jōchō redefined the body shape of Buddha statues by perfecting the technique of yosegi zukuri (寄木造り), which is a combination of several woods. The peaceful expression and graceful figure of the Buddha statue that he made completed a Japanese style of sculpture of Buddha statues called Jōchō yō (定朝様, Jōchō style) and determined the style of Japanese Buddhist statues of the later period. His achievement dramatically raised the social status of busshi (Buddhist sculptor) in Japan.

Sculpture further developed from techniques of the late Nara period. Hyperrealism became a popular style in renderings of Buddha, deities, and priests; which is marked by an exaggeration of naturalistic features. Painting also evolved during this period with depictions of hell and the Pure Land. Depictions of hell came into being as Japan entered the period of mappo – a time of mass chaos and disturbance. Conversely, images of the Amida Buddha descending from heaven to collect the souls of those with good karma, known as Raigozu (来迎図), became a popular theme throughout the Heian period.

In terms of temple structures, the temples erected Mt. Kōya were built in the Kii mountains, far away from the Court and the laity in the capital. The irregular topography of these sites forced Japanese architects to rethink the problems of temple construction, and in so doing to choose more indigenous elements of design. Cypress-bark roofs replaced those of ceramic tile, wood planks were used instead of earthen floors, and a separate worship area for the laity was added in front of the main sanctuary. The temple that best reflects the spirit of early Heian Shingon temples is the Murō-ji (early 9th century), set deep in a stand of cypress trees on a mountain southeast of Nara. Key works include: To Temple Mandala and Yakushi figures.

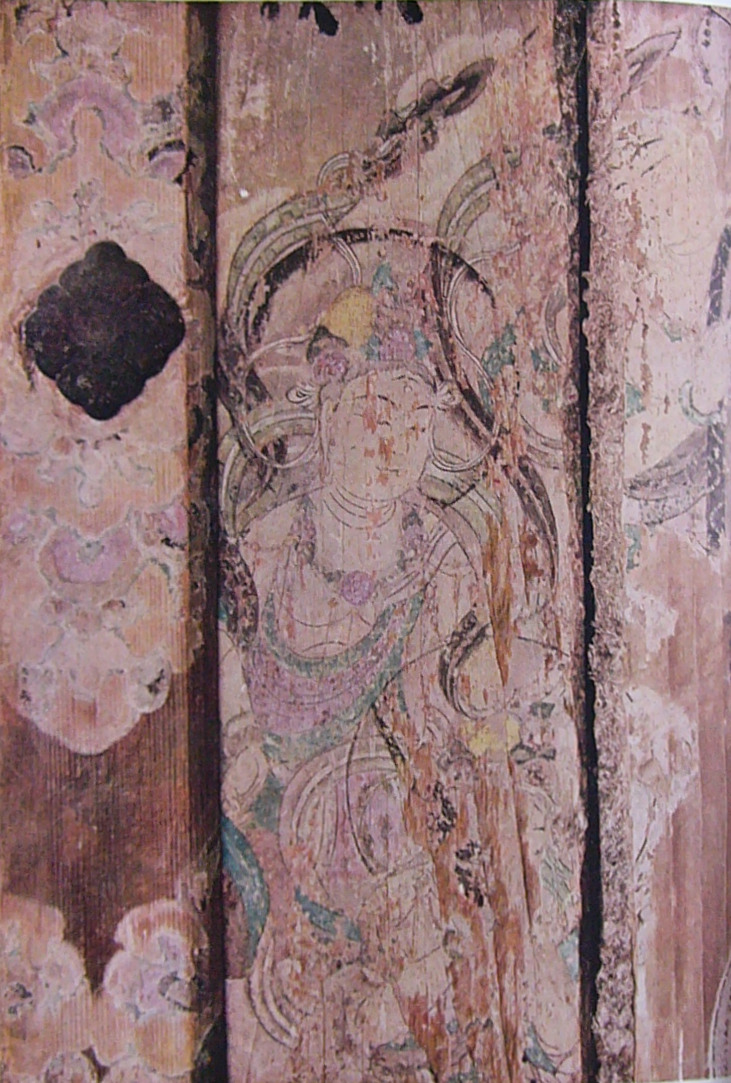
Wall Painting on South door of Byōdō-in

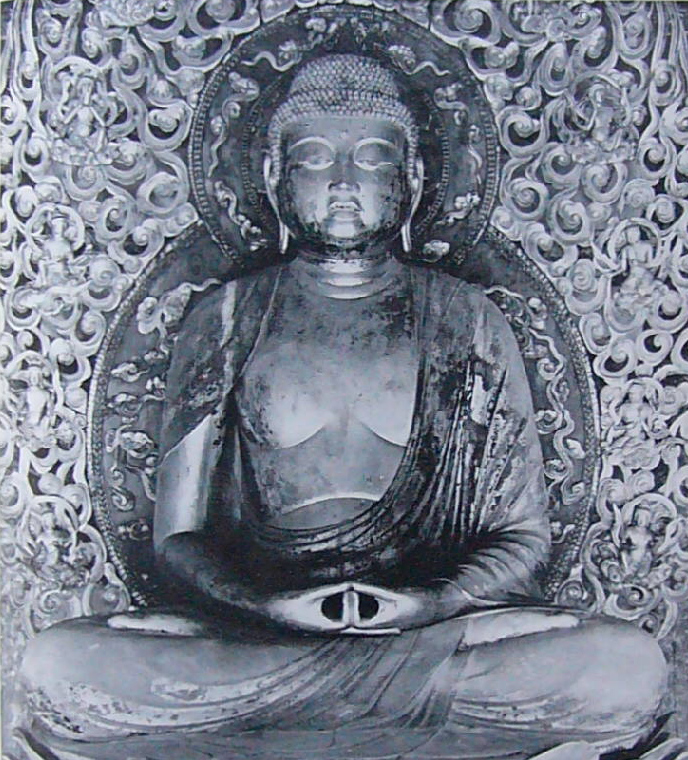
Amitābha in Byōdō-in created by Jōchō. 1053.

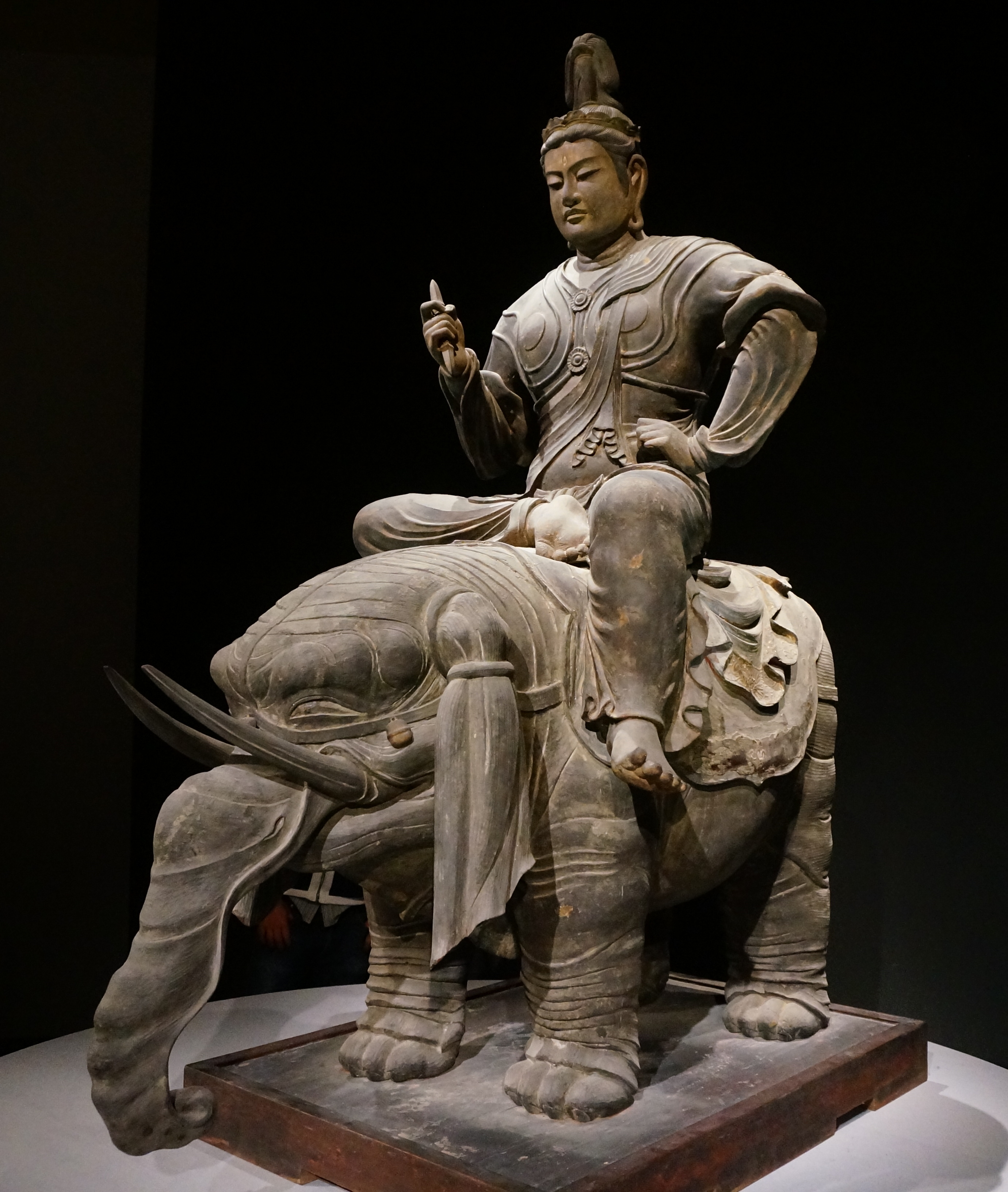
Taishakuten Śakra, 839, Tō-ji

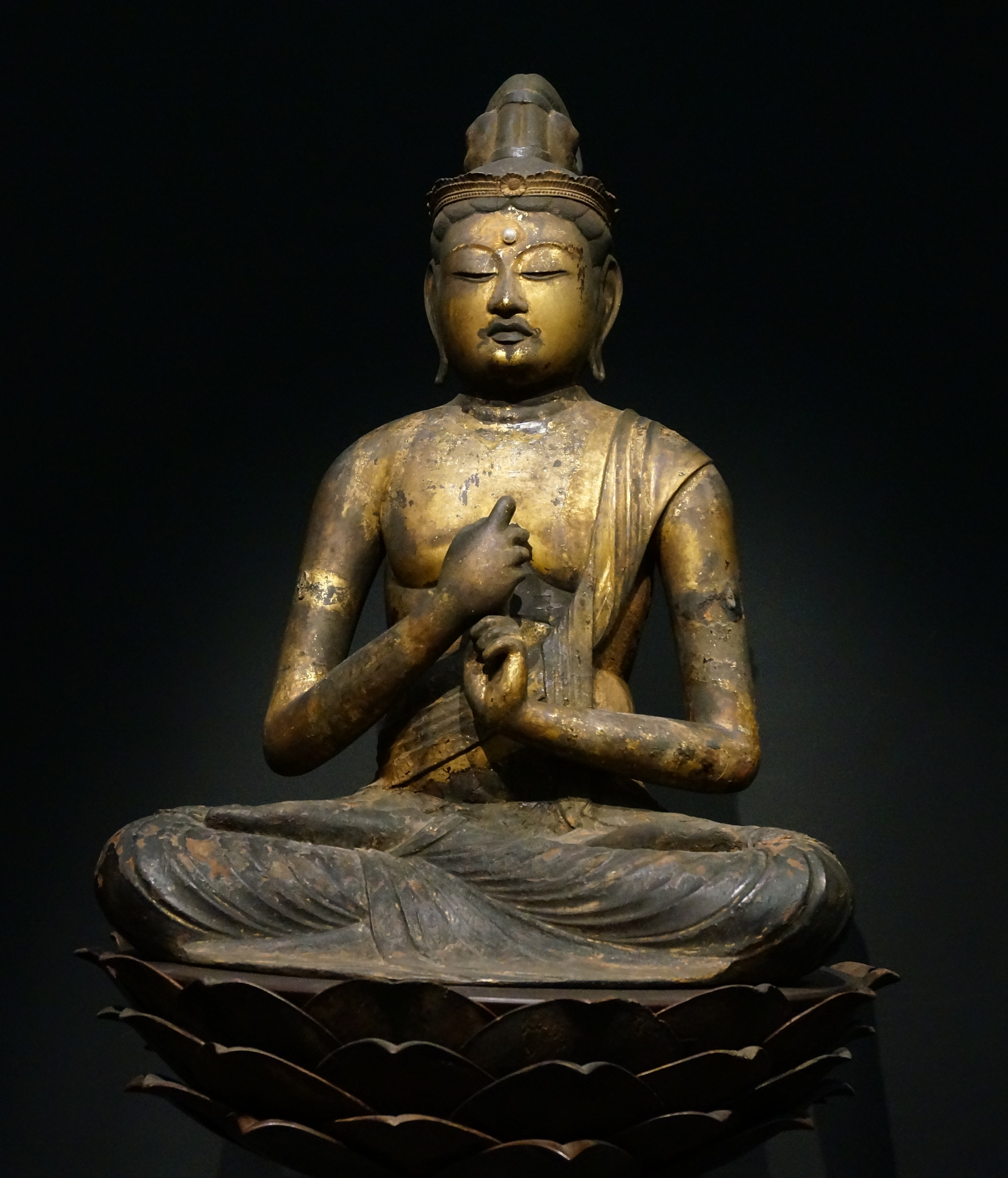
A gilt-wood statue of Vairocana Buddha, 11th–12th century

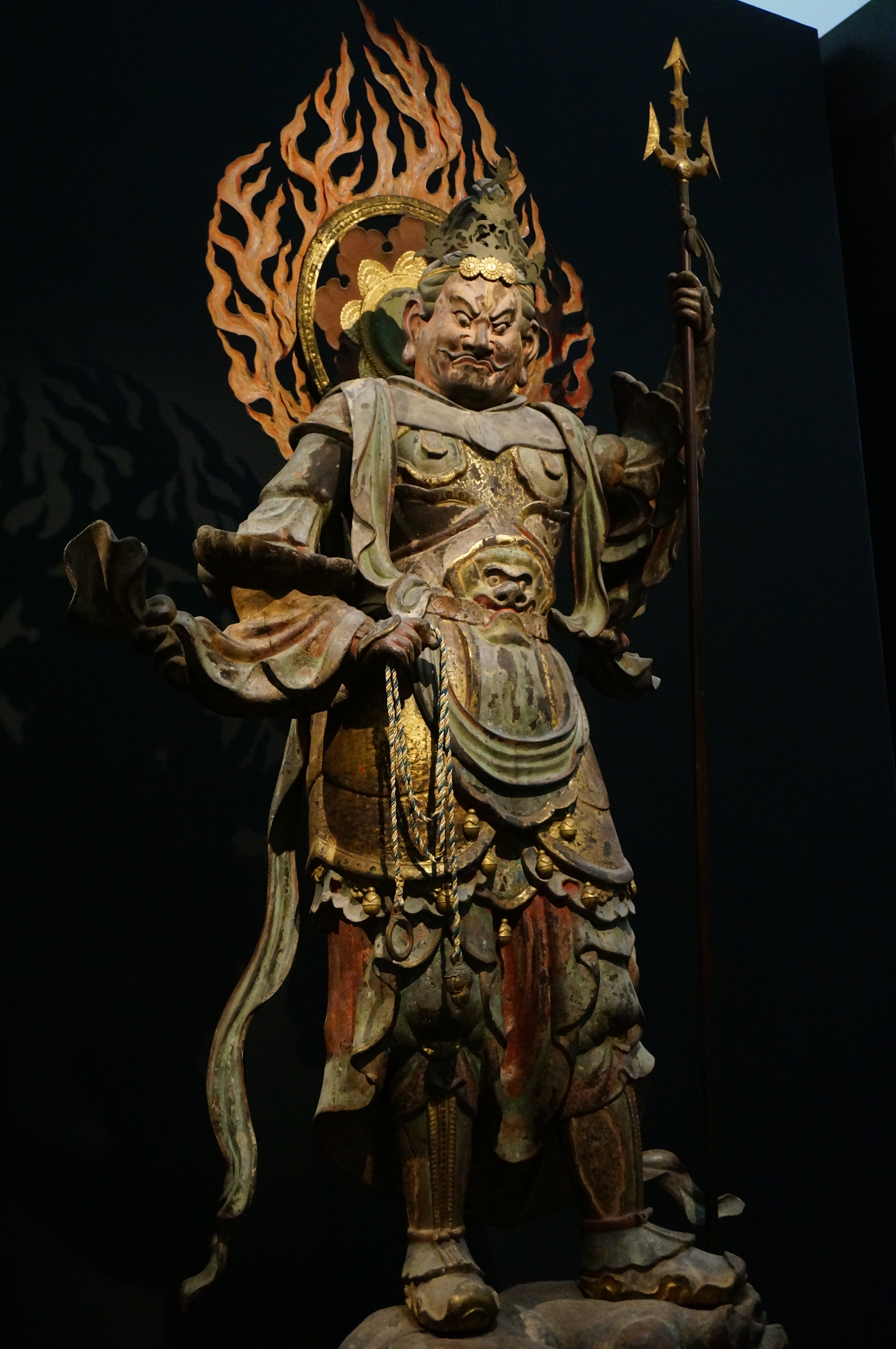
Statue of Virūpākṣa. Jōruri-ji, 11th–12th century

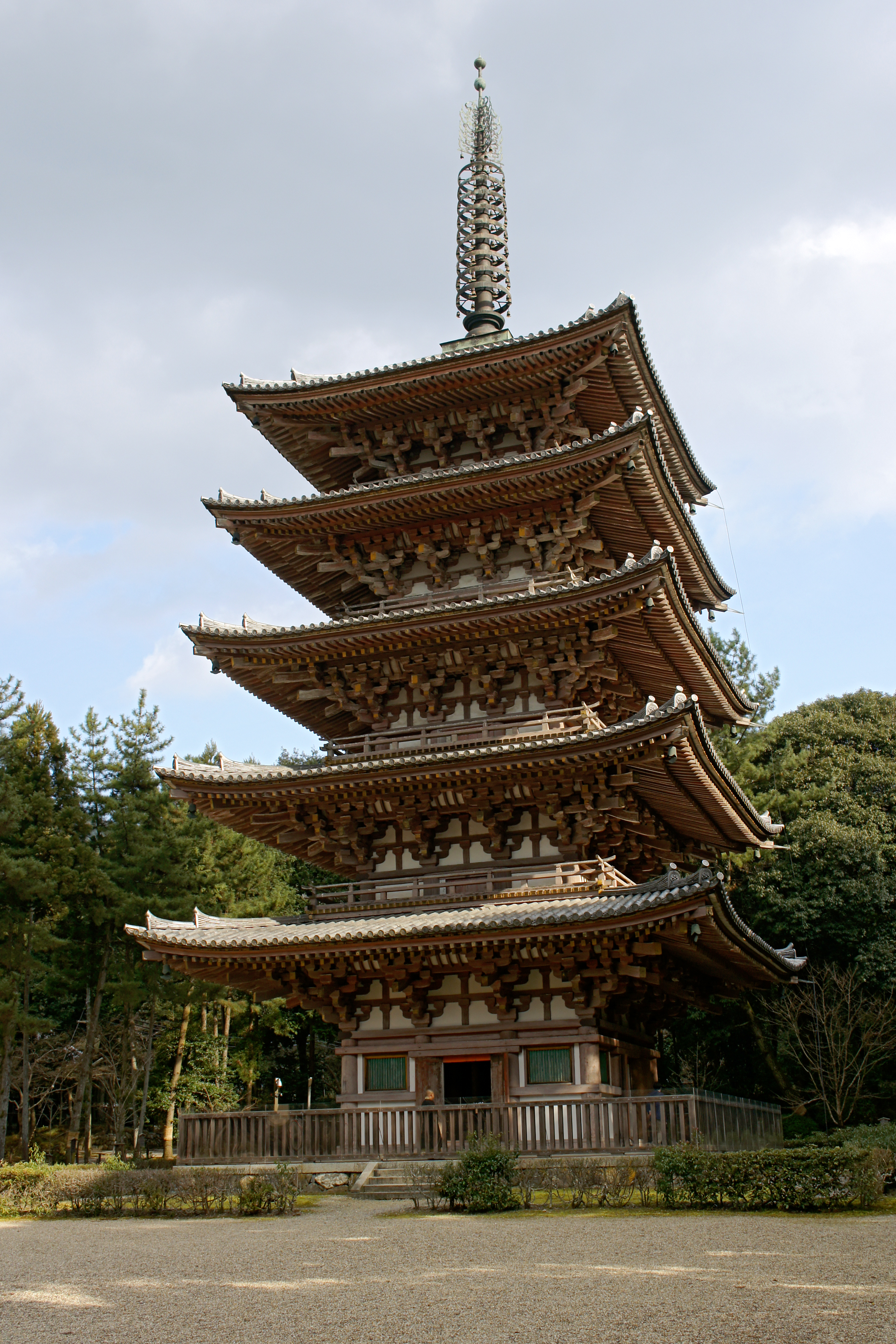
Oagida of Daigo-ji in Kyoto. It was built in 951.

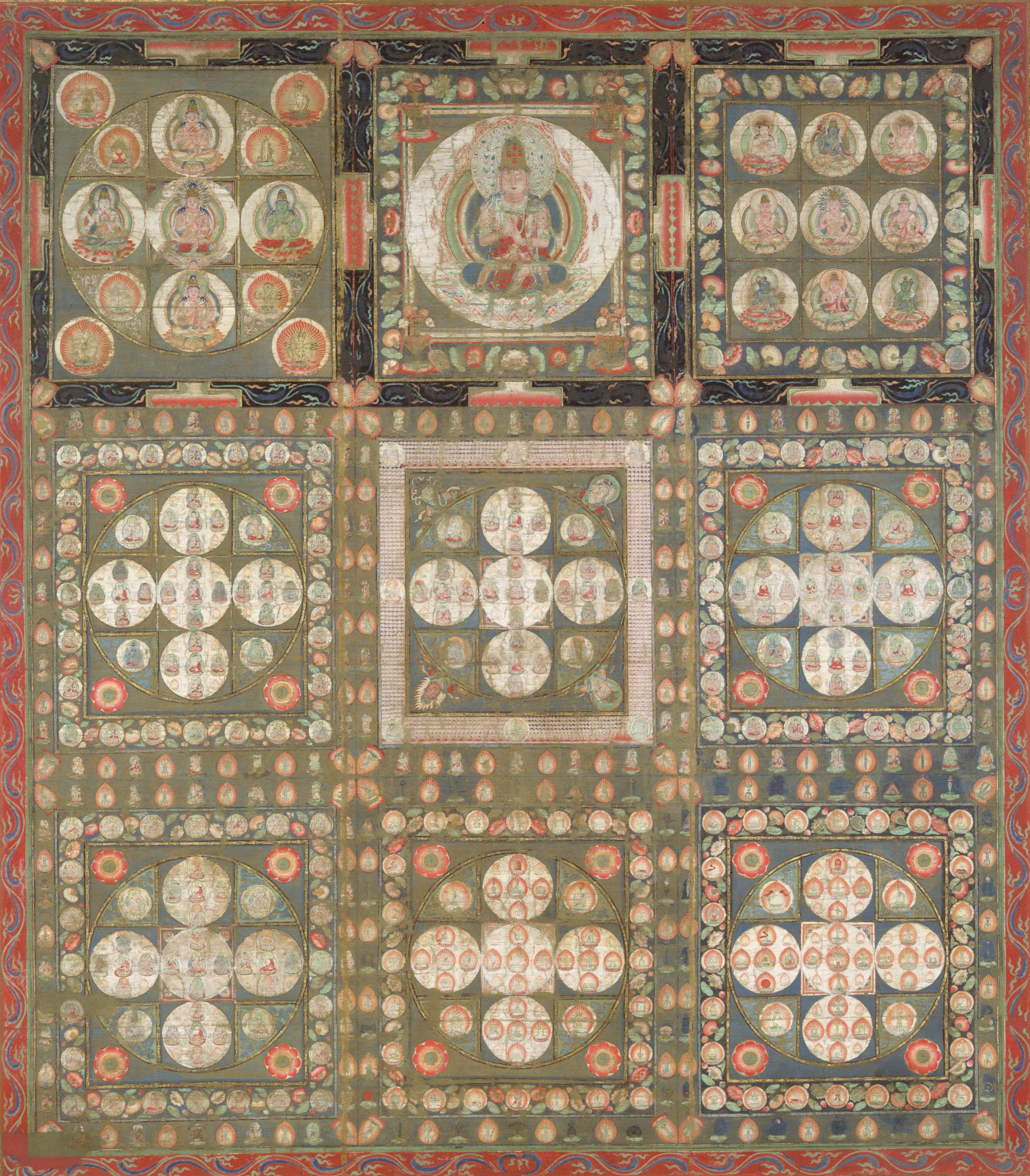
Kongokai (vajra) mandala – Shingon tantric buddhist school

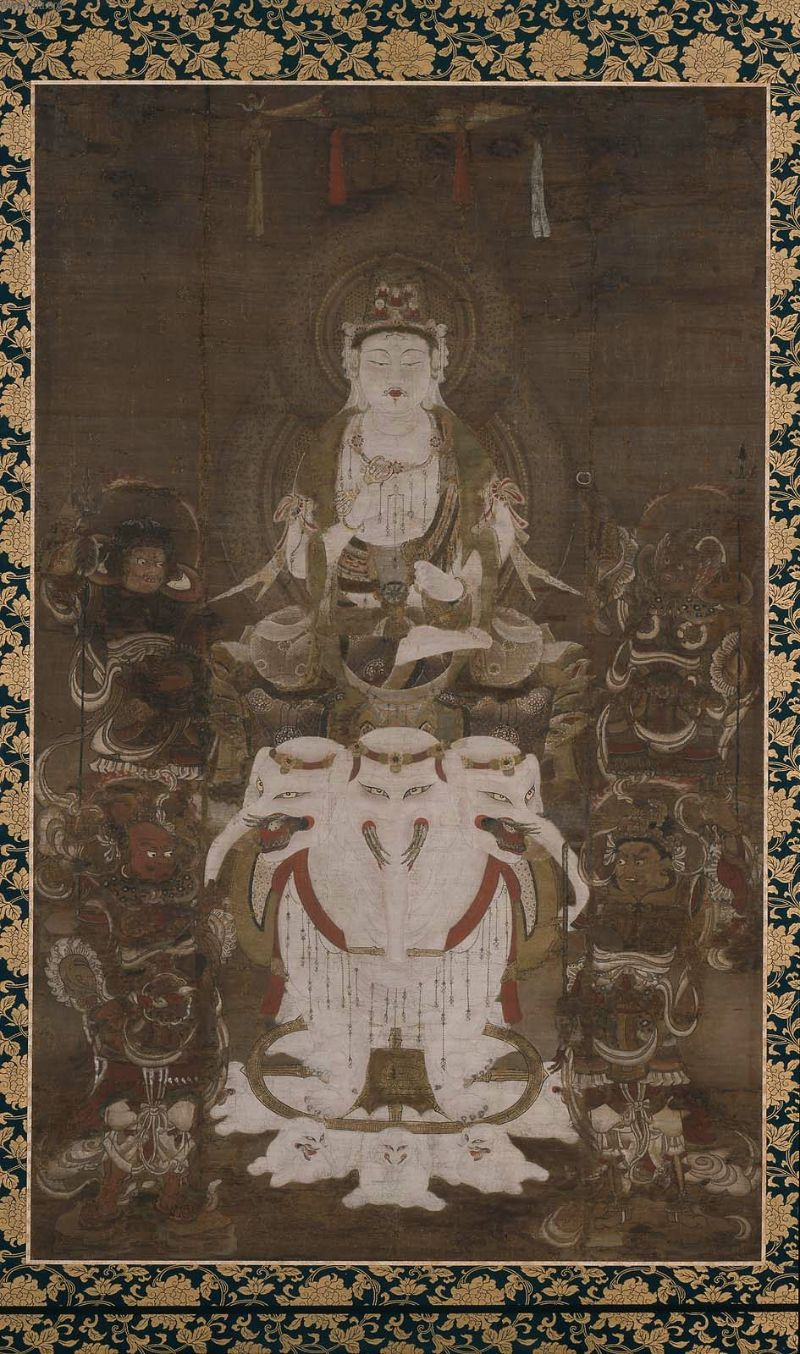
Fugen enmei, the Bodhisattva of Universal Virtue who Prolongs Life, 12th century. Ink, color, gold, and silver on silk.

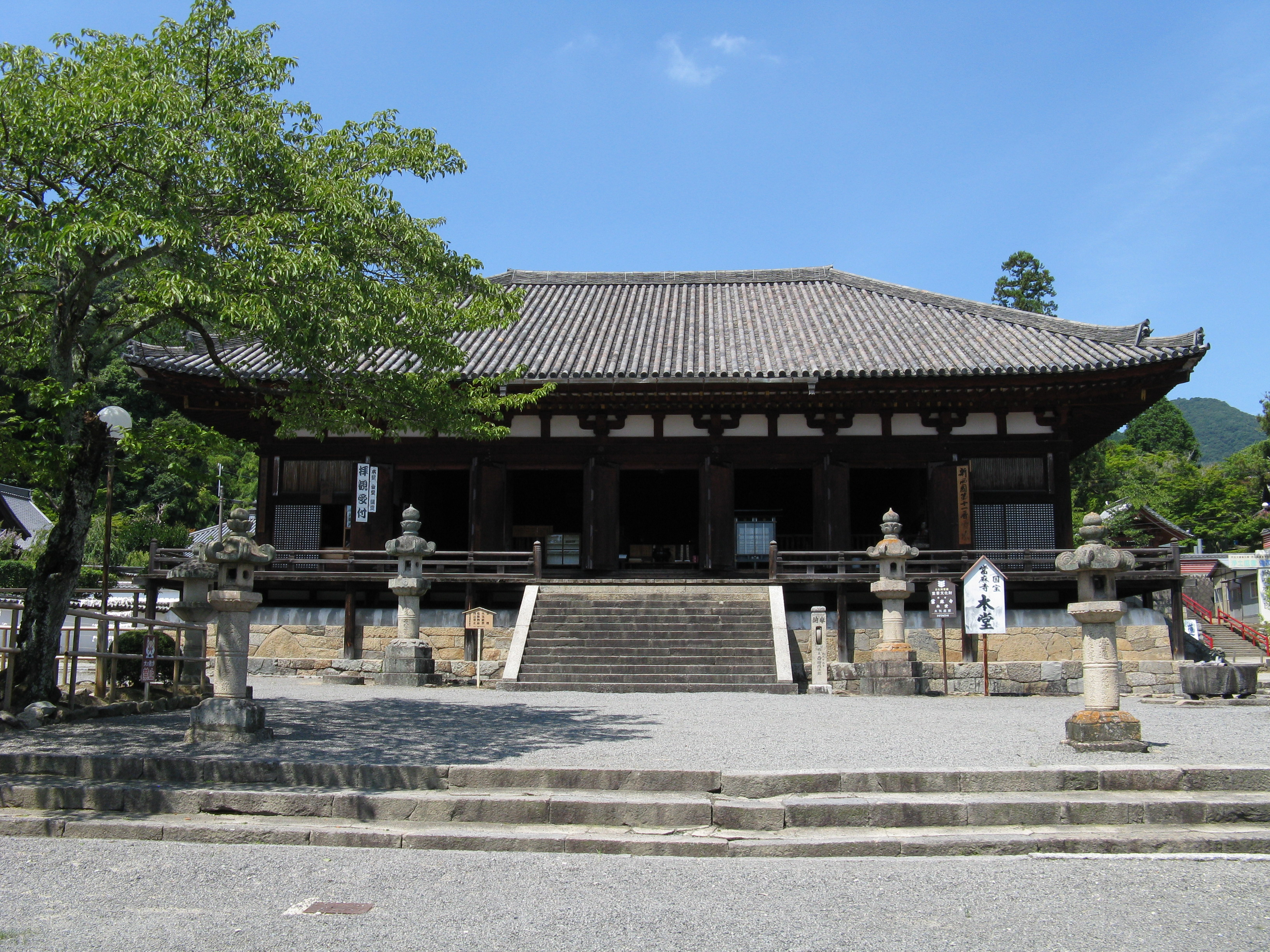
Mandarado of Taima-dera in Katsuragi. It was built in 1161.

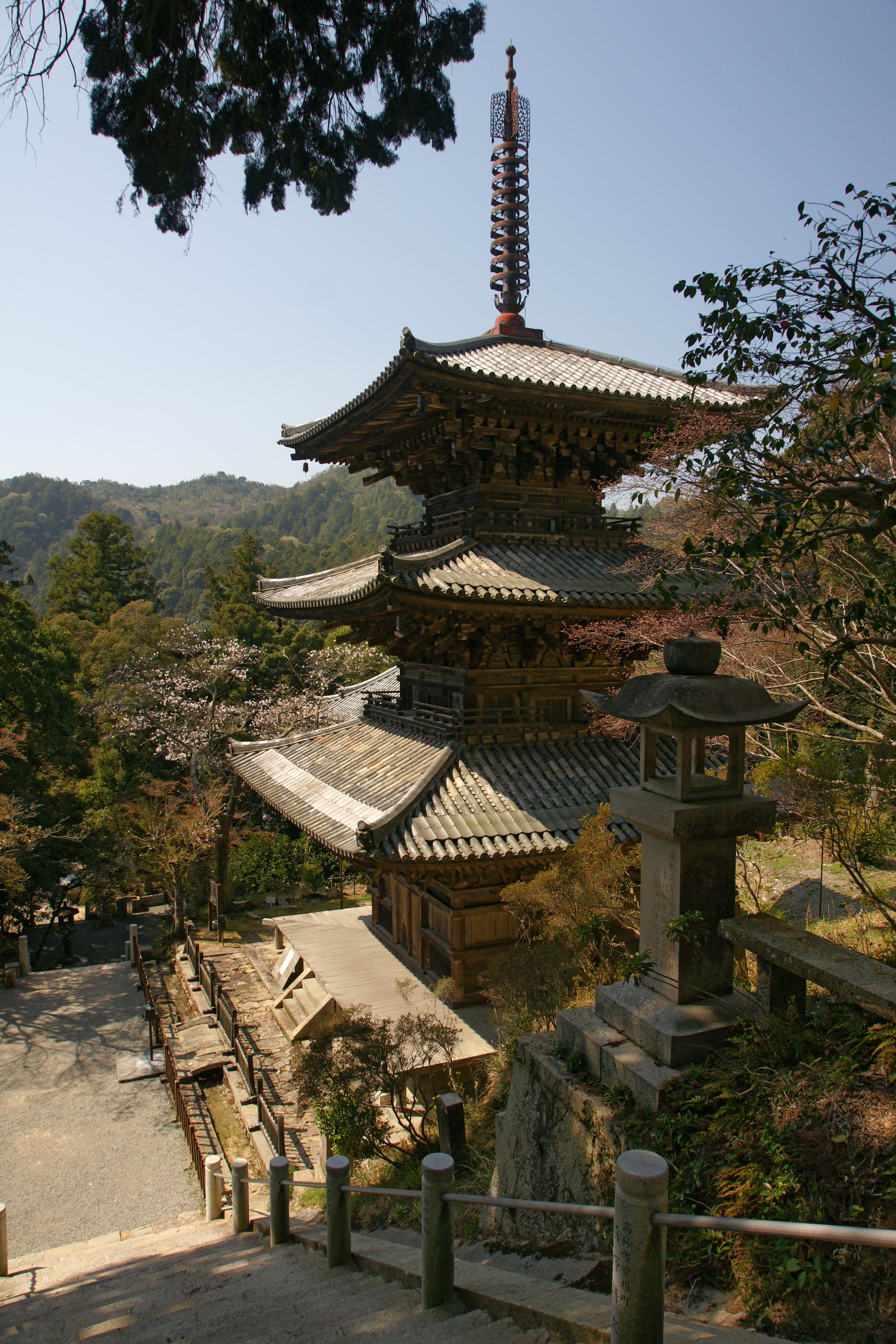
Pagoda of Ichijō-ji. It was built in 1171.

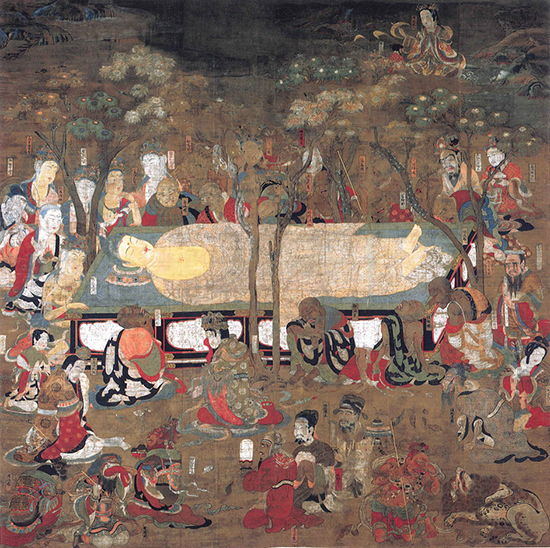
Buddha's Nirvana. Hanging scroll, 267.6 cmx 271.2 cm. Color on silk. Located at Kongōbu-ji, Mt. Kōya.

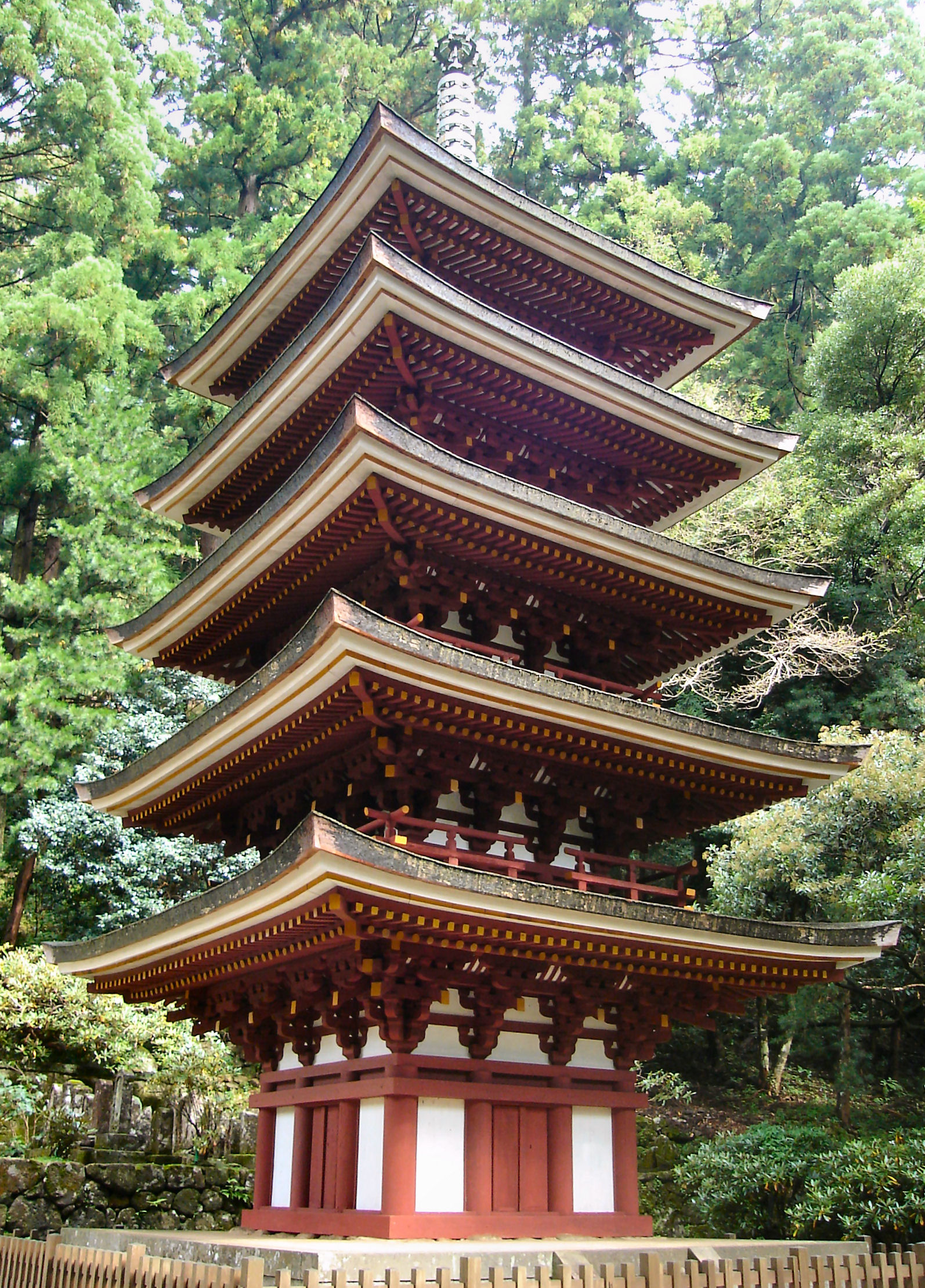
Five storied pagoda at Murō-ji. It was built in 800.

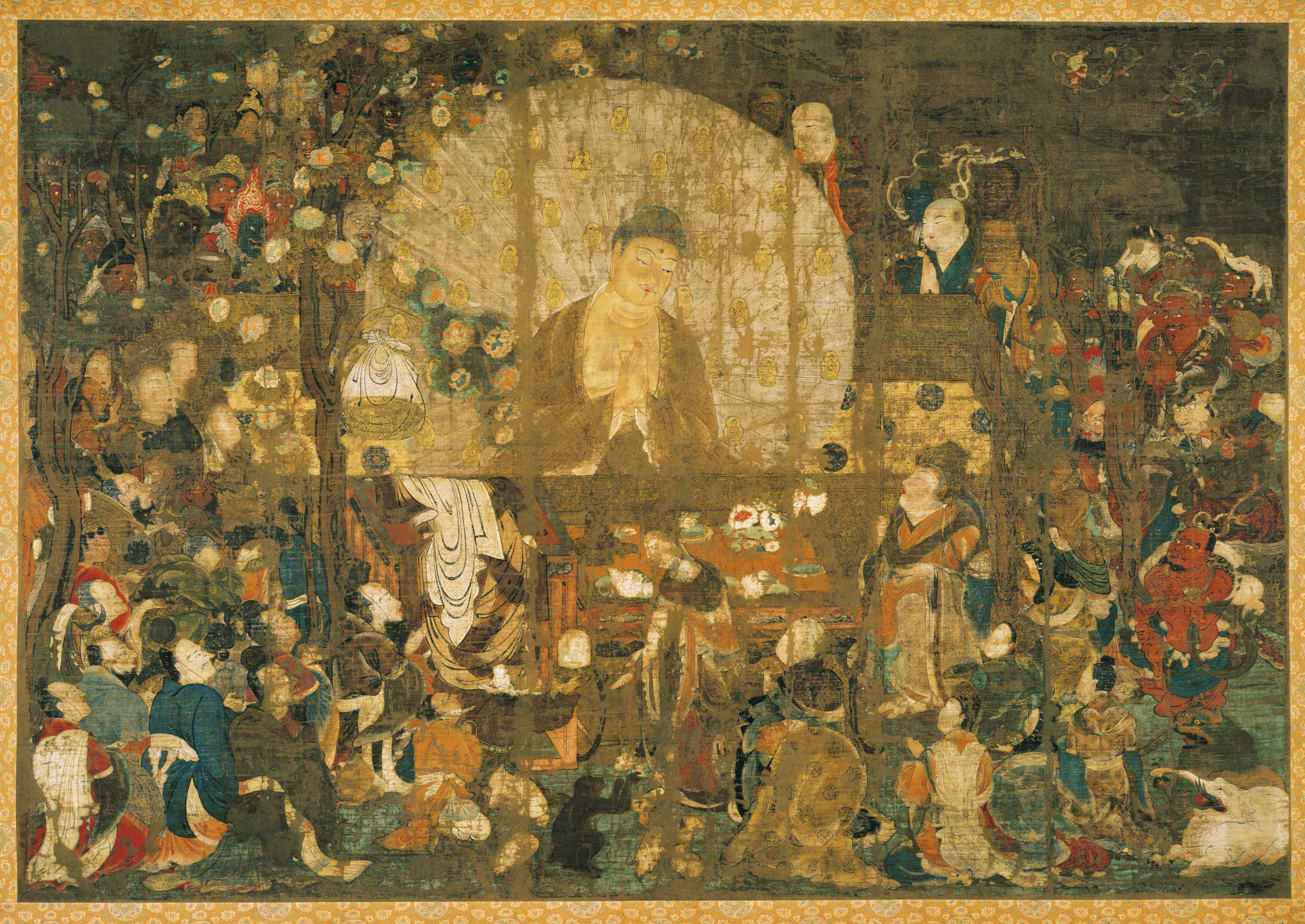
Shaka rising from the Gold Coffin. Late Heian, hanging scroll.

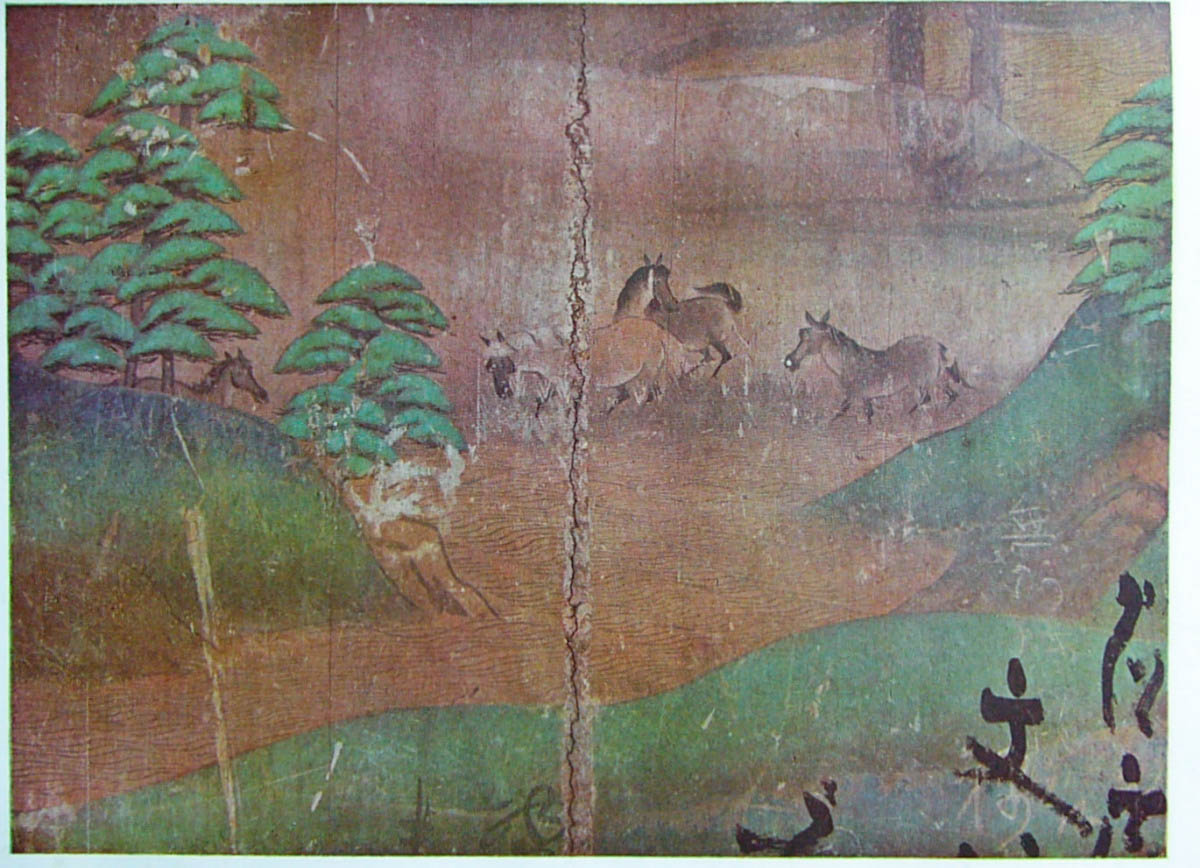
Wall painting on East door of Byōdō-in, Detail

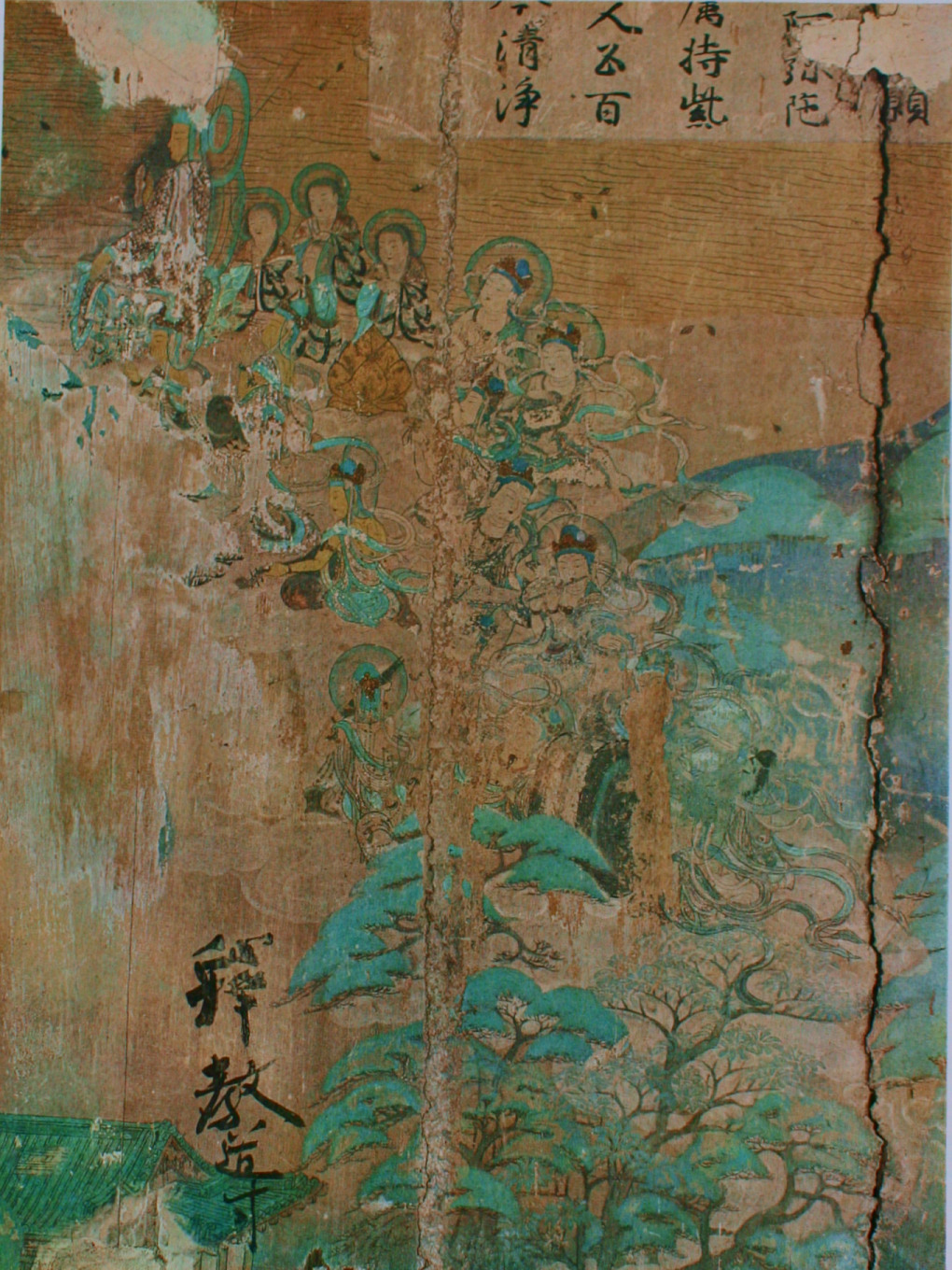
Wall painting on South door of Byōdō-in

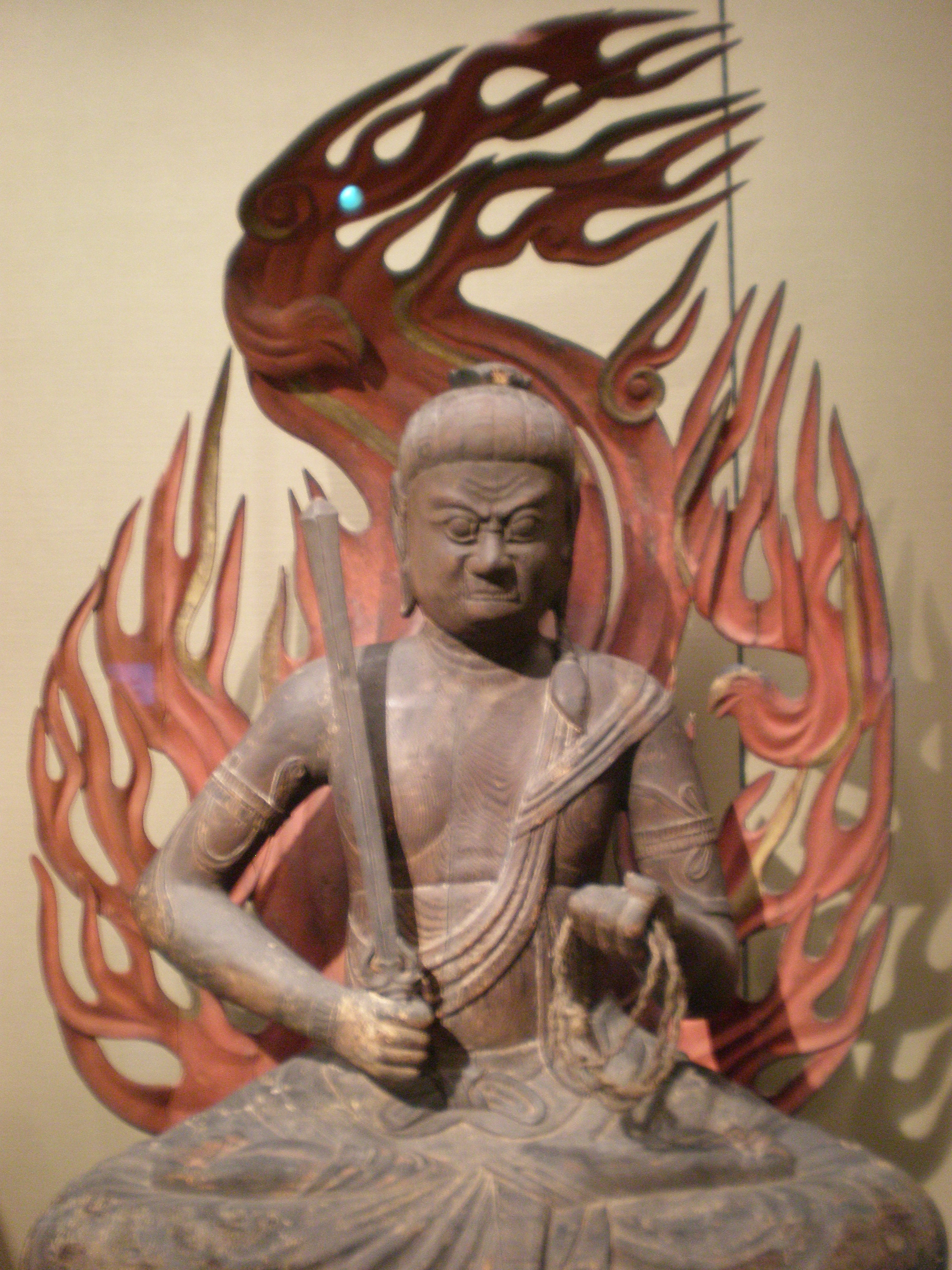
Achala Vidyaraja (Wisdom King), 1100–1185

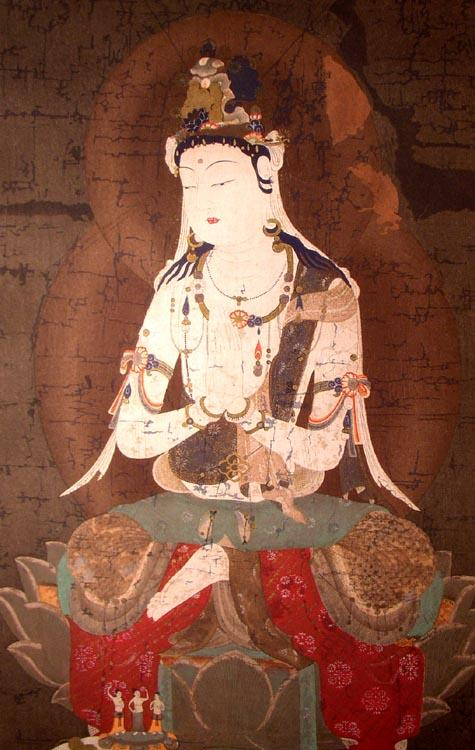
Bodhisattva Samantabhadra

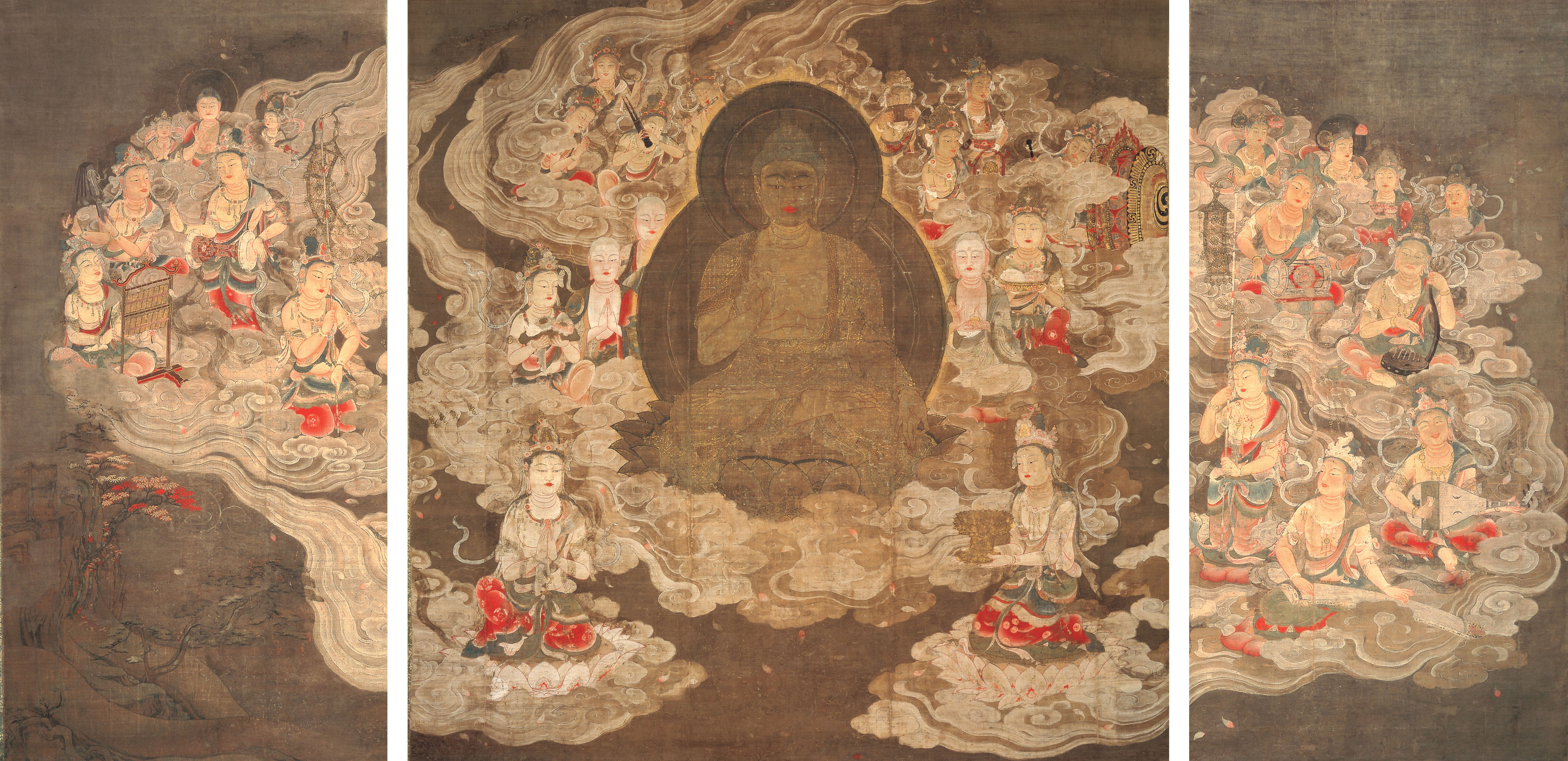
Amitabha Buddha. Late Heian, Color on silk Yushihachimanko Juhachika-in Temple. Central of three hanging scrolls.

== Kamakura period (1185–1333) ==
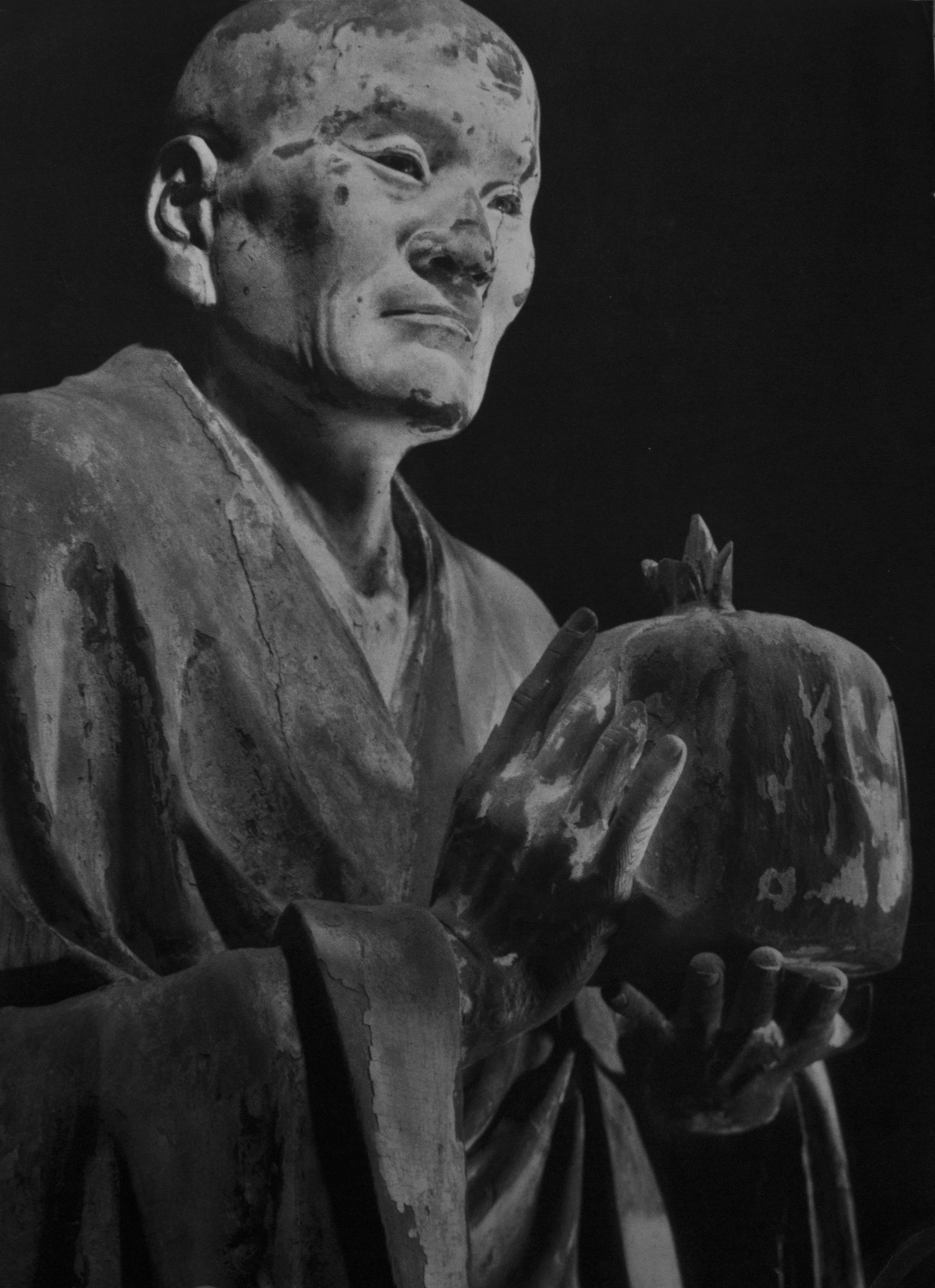
Muchaku by Unkei, Kōfuku-ji, 1212, National Treasure

The dates of the Kamakura period are 1185–1333 AD. This period is marked by the Gempei Wars, a series of civil wars in the late 12th century between rival families. This eventually led to the rise of the feudalistic Kamakura shogunate, so named because the victorious family, the Minamoto clan, established their political base in Kamakura. The emperor remained in Kyoto as a figurehead, but the actual political power rested with the shōgun. The Kamakura period saw the reestablishment of cultural ties with China, as well as the growth of Zen Buddhism and Pure Land Buddhism as the two major branches of Japanese Buddhism. These new Kamakura patrons also favored a more realistic and naturalistic art which is exemplified by the sculpture of the Kei school. The Kei school developed out of that led by the busshi (Buddhist sculptor) Jocho's successor, Kakujō and Kakujō's son Raijō, the leading sculptors of the preceding generations. These artists are sometimes said to have founded the Kei school; however, the school would not come into its own, and become associated with the name "Kei" until Raijō was succeeded by Kōkei and Unkei around the year 1200.

With this shift in power, there was a cultural shift in values (strength, discipline, austerity) which were in keeping with Zen Buddhism (holds that the only way to enlightenment is through meditation). During this period there was also a national insecurity regarding the Mongols and a fear of invasion. This anxiety manifested itself in Buddhist art as there was a splurge in renderings of divine intervention and guardian figures. The technique in which this was done is known as Kamakura realism- an idealized focus on naturalistic features. Painting during this period has an extreme focus on mortality and immediacy. Scenes depicting hell and the Pure Land continued in popularity in narrative scrolls. It was thought that commissioning, producing, and using these scrolls would improve ones karma.

Among sculptors of the Kei school, Unkei is the most famous and considered to be the most accomplished sculptor of the period. Among his works, a pair of large Nio (or Kongō Rikishi) in Tōdai-ji depict muscular guardians in a dramatic contrapposto stance. Unkei's sculptures of Indian priests Mujaku and Seshin in Kōfuku-ji demonstrate a new portrait-like realism. Both statues sport priestly vestments that frame their bodies realistically. They stand life-size and alone and are fully sculpted in the round as if intended to be viewed from any angle. Mujaku is depicted as a thin man manipulating some sort of holy, cloth-wrapped object. He appears reserved and reflective. Seshin, in contrast, is depicted in mid conversation, gesturing and speaking, an extroverted counterweight to the solemn Mujaku. The men are shown as specific people, not simply members of a stock type.

Unkei had six sculptor sons and their work is also imbued with the new humanism. Tankei, the eldest son and a brilliant sculptor became the head of the studio. Kōshō, the 4th son produced a remarkable sculpture of the 10th-century Japanese Buddhist teacher Kuya (903–972). Kaikei was a collaborator of Unkei and worked with him on the Nio statues in 1203. He worked with priest Chogen (1121–1206): the director of Tōdai-ji reconstruction project. Many of his figures are more idealized than Unkei and his sons, and are characterized by a beautifully finished surface, richly decorated with pigments and gold. His works have survived more than 40, many of which are signed by himself.

Much of the cities of Nara and Kyoto were destroyed in the Genpei War of 1180–1185. The Kei school was granted the opportunity to restore Nara's greatest temples, the Tōdai-ji and Kōfuku-ji, replacing their Buddhist sculptures. The leading figure in this effort was Shunjobo Chogen (1121–1206), who was known to have made three trips to China to study sculpture. The Tōdai-ji restoration project lasted several generations, from roughly 1180 to 1212, and drew extensively on Tang and Song Chinese styles, introducing new stylistic elements while remaining true to tradition.

One of the most outstanding Buddhist arts of the period was the statue of Buddha enshrined in Sanjūsangen-dō consisting of 1032 statues produced by sculptors of Buddhist statues of the Kei school, In school and En school. The 1 principal image Senju Kannon in the center, the surrounding 1001 Senju Kannon, the 28 attendants of Senju Kannon, Fūjin and Raijin create a solemn space, and all Buddha statues are designated as National Treasures.

In terms of painting, some of the most popular paintings of the Kamakura period depict an ascending Amida Buddha. The main tenet of Pure Land Buddhism is that chanting the name of Amida could lead to a reincarnation in the pure land. Thus, scrolls of Amida would be hung in the room of the dying who would be saved by chanting the Amida mantra. Key works include: Sanjusangendo Temple, Hachiman in the guise of a monk, Chogen, Nio figures of Todaiji, The Priest Kuya, Zoshi's Hell Scrolls, Jizo Raigo, Jeweled pagod mandala.

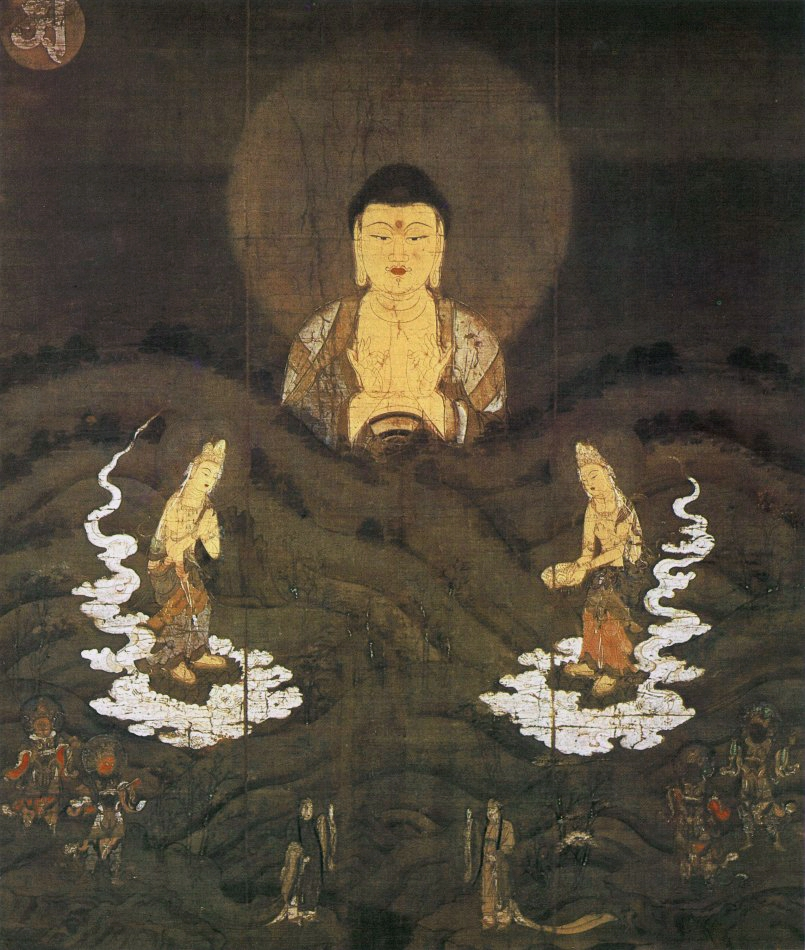
Descent of Amitabha over the Mountain. Hanging scroll. Color on silk. Located at Eikan-dō Zenrin-ji, Kyoto.

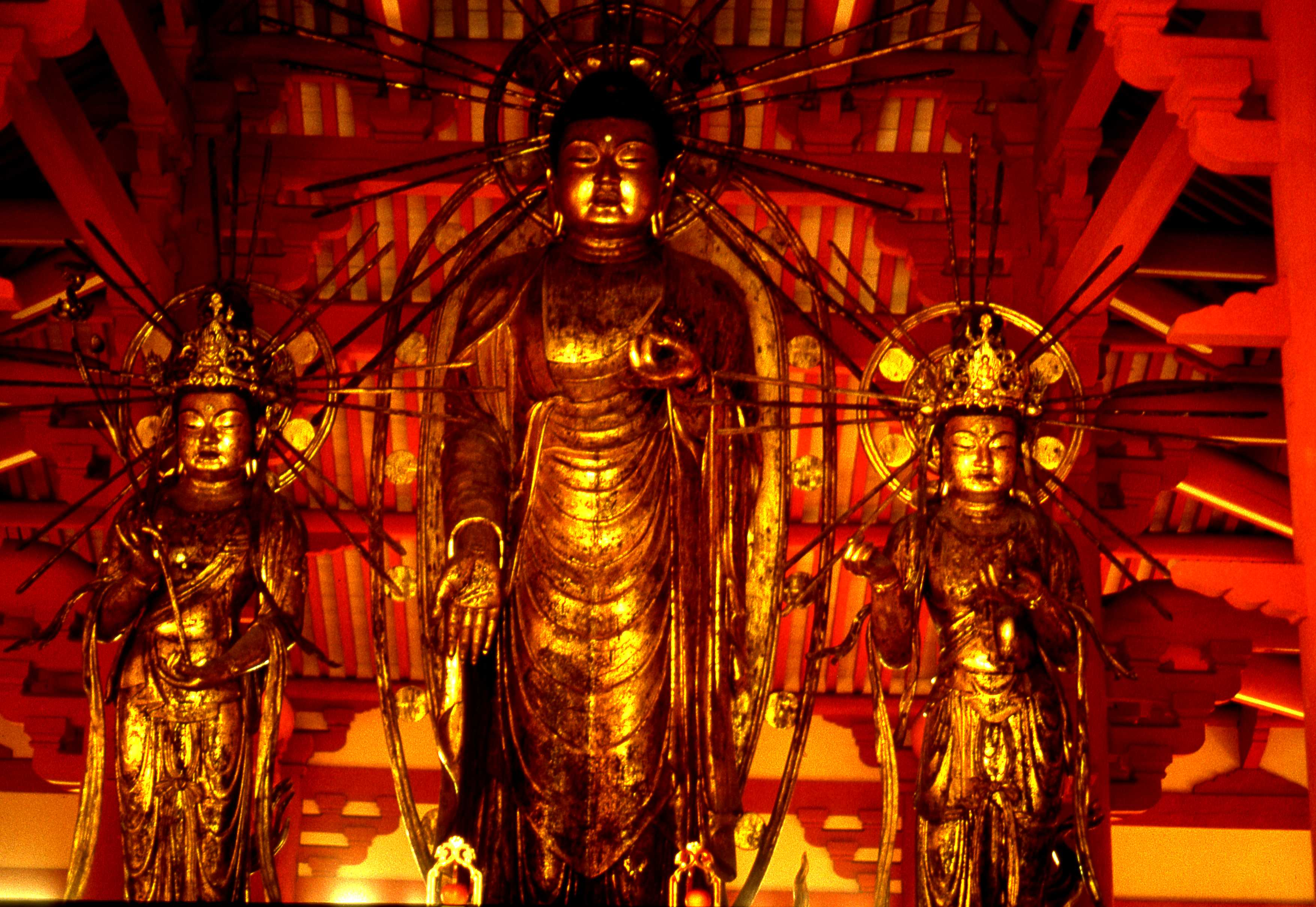
Amitābha by Kaikei. Jōdo-ji, 1195–1197

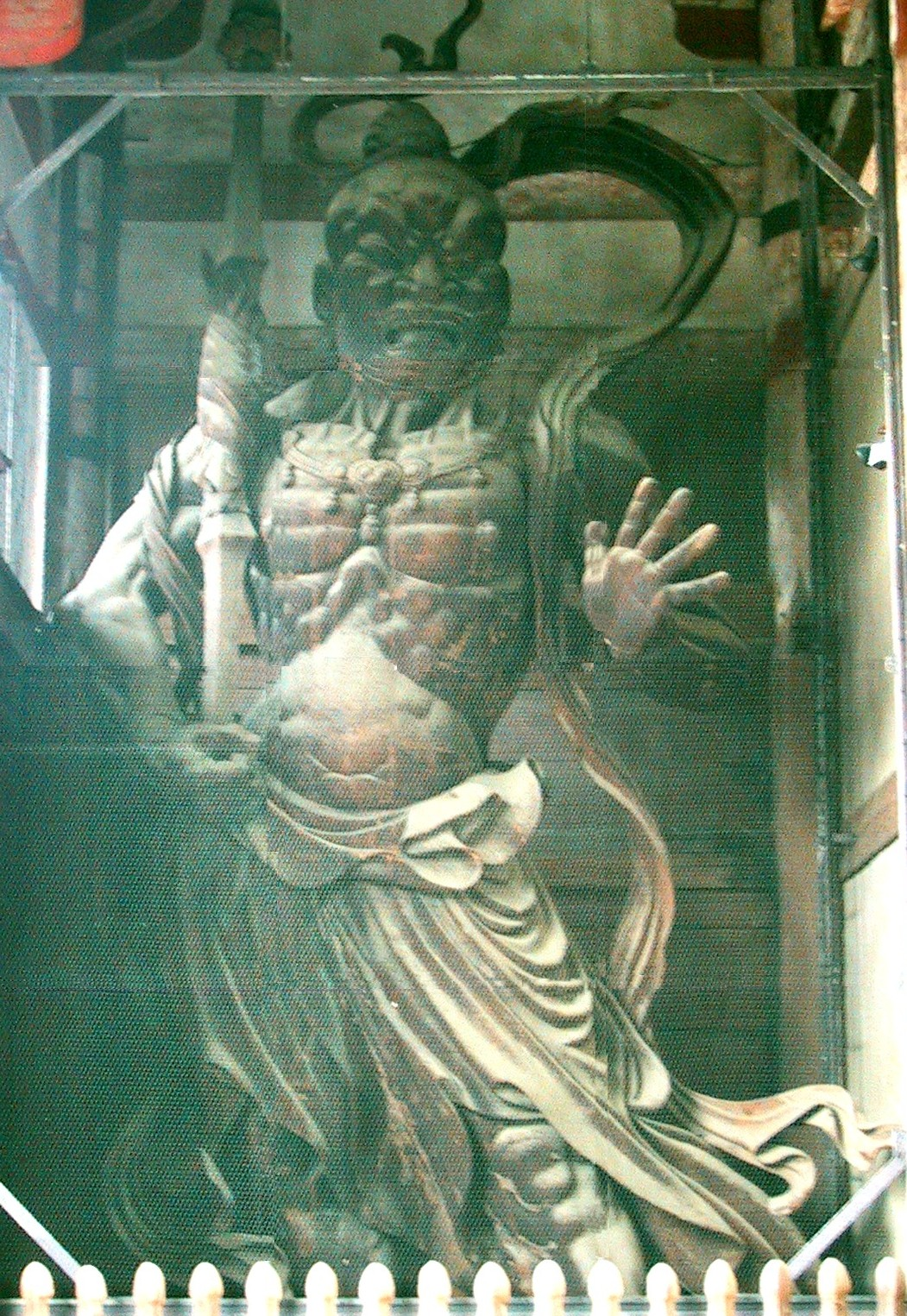
Nio guardian in Tōdai-ji, by Unkei, 1203

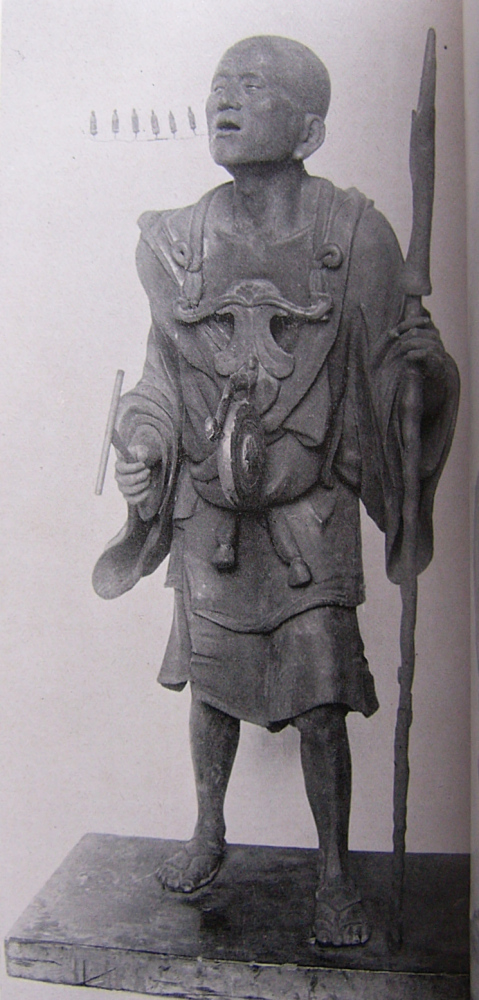
Portrait of monk Kūya (CE 930–972), total about cm height, wood, colored, CE13th century by Kosho

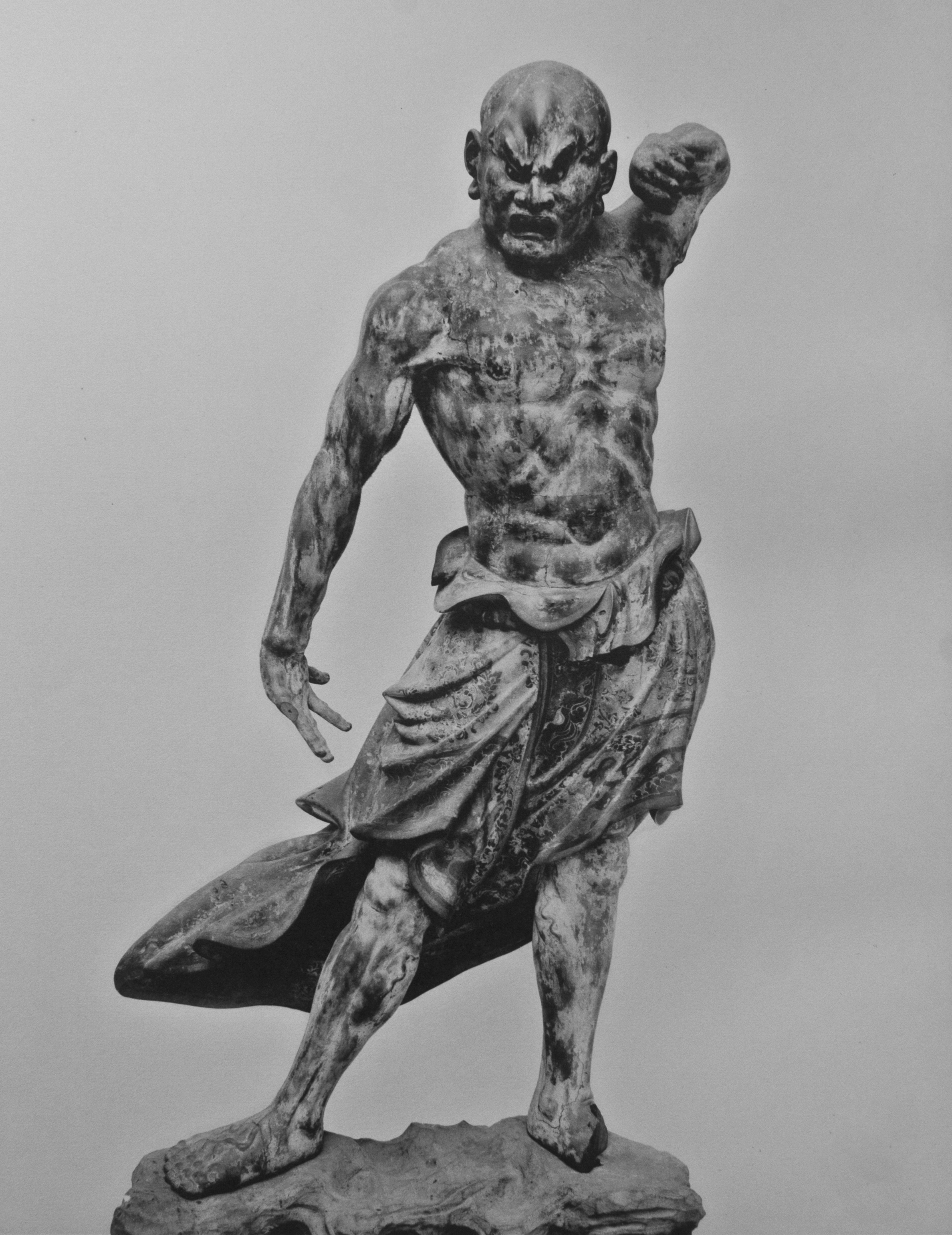
Kongō Rikishi, Kōfuku-ji, National Treasure

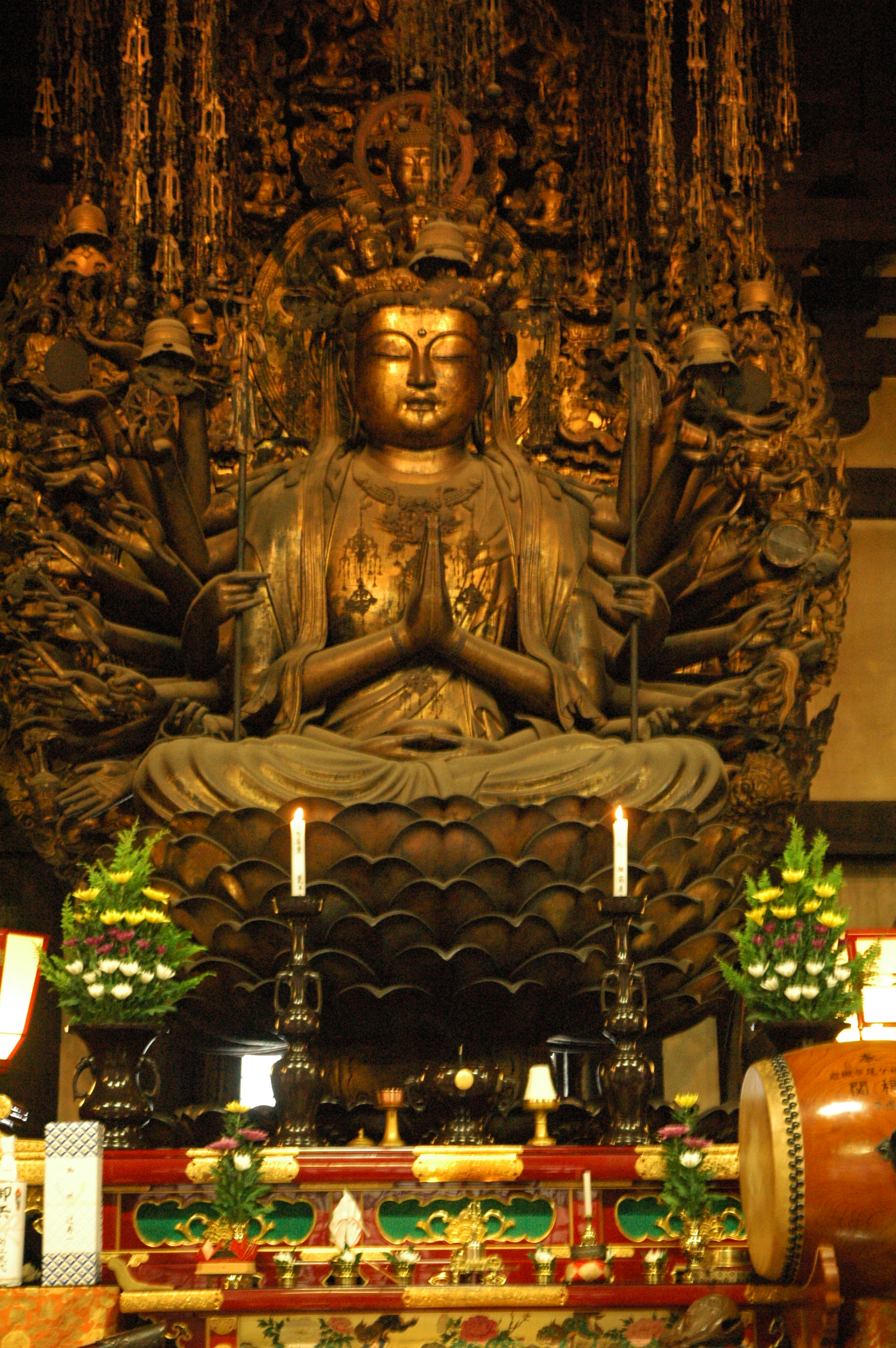
Senju Kannon by Tankei, Sanjūsangen-dō. 1254.

Kamakura Daibutsu (Amida Buddha) at Kōtoku-in

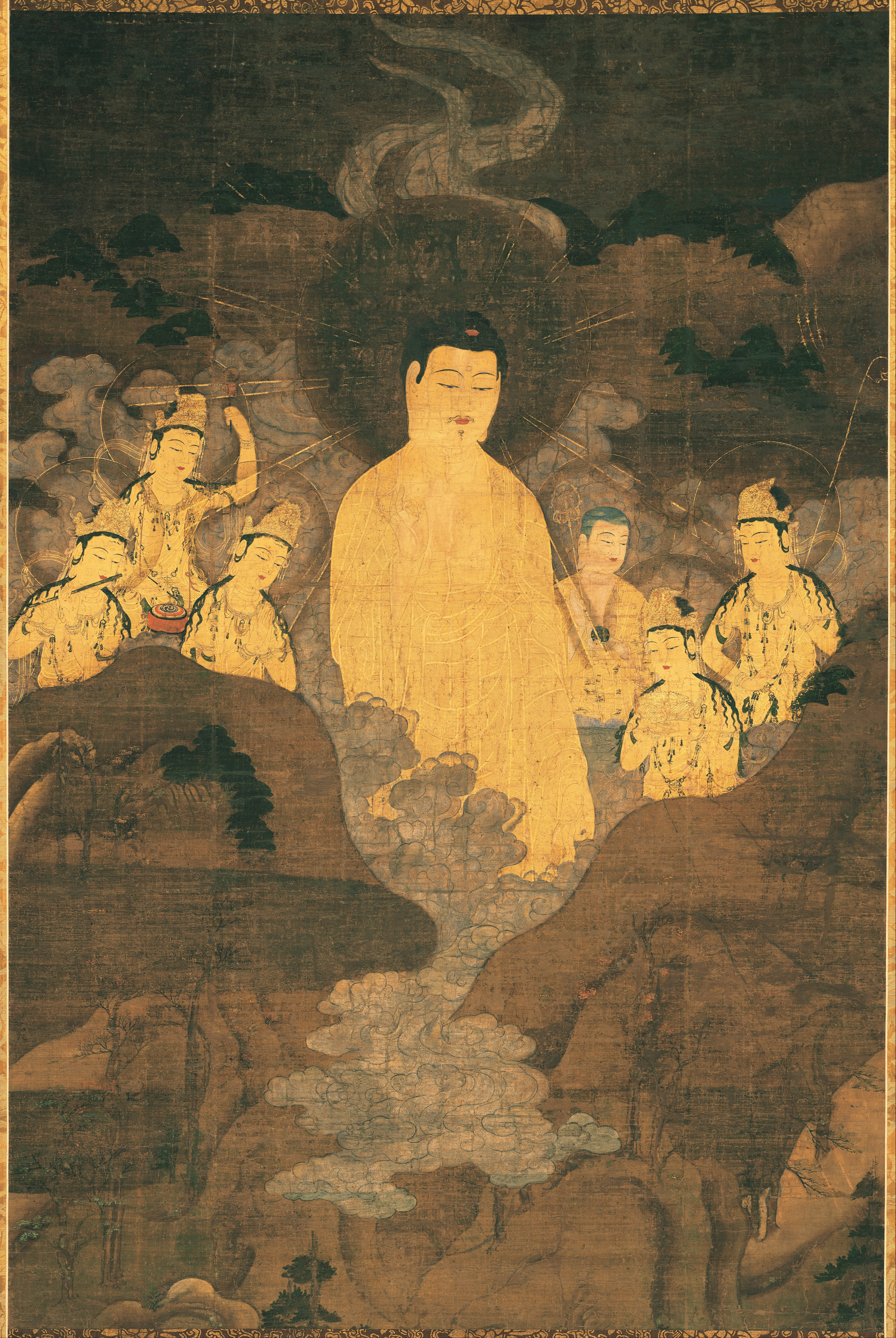
Amida coming over the Mountain from the Kyoto National Museum dated to the 13th century. Hanging scroll, 120.6 cm x 80.3 cm. Color on silk.

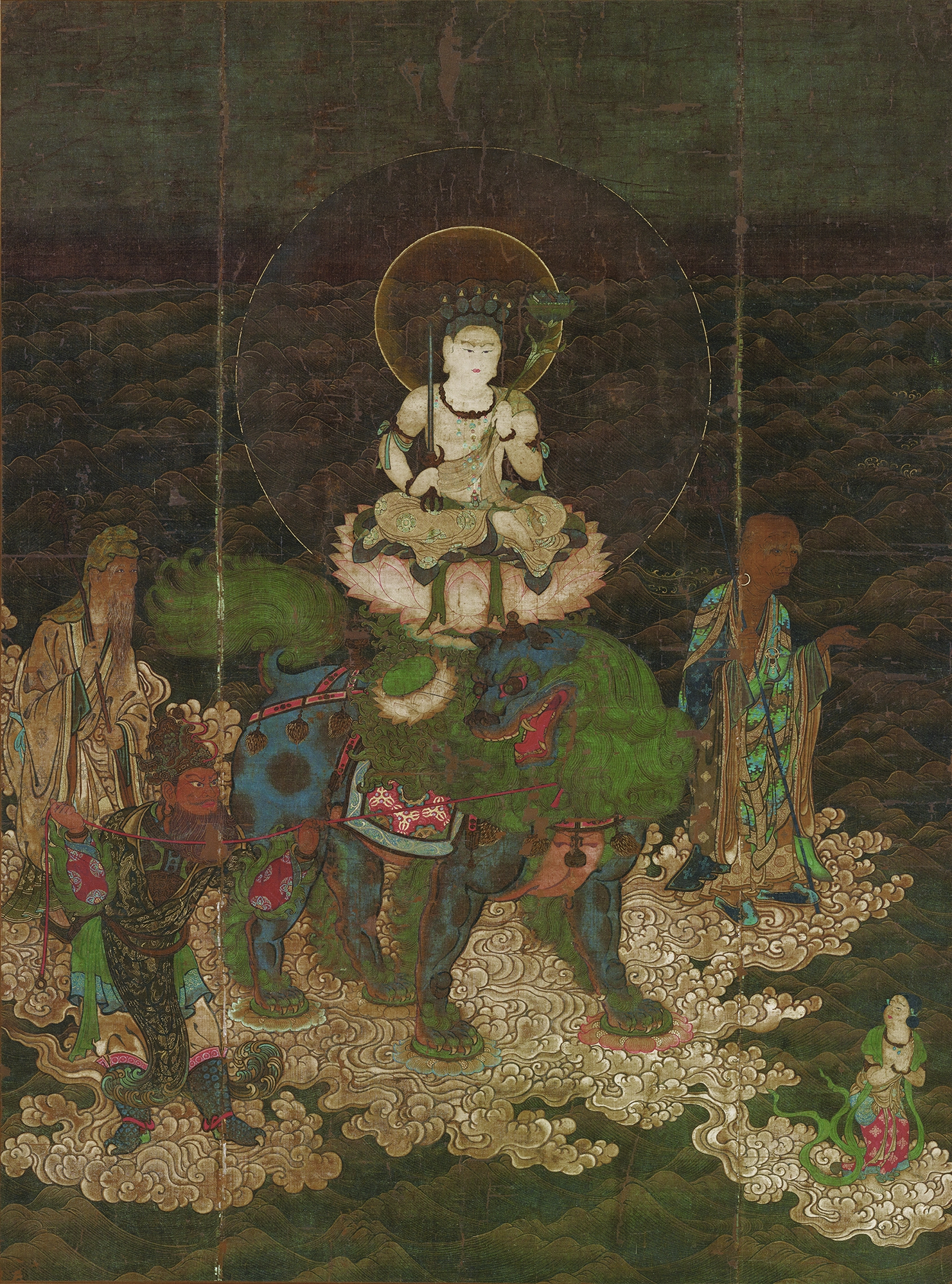
Monju crossing the sea. Hanging scroll, 143.0 cm × 106.4 cm. Color on silk. Located at Daigo-ji, Kyoto.

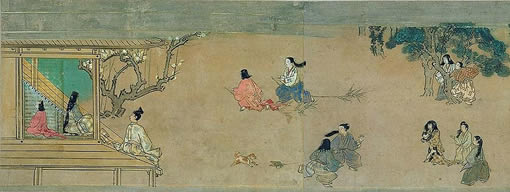
The illustrated biography of priest Hōnen. Part of the handscroll (Emakimono), illustrated biographies of famous priests.

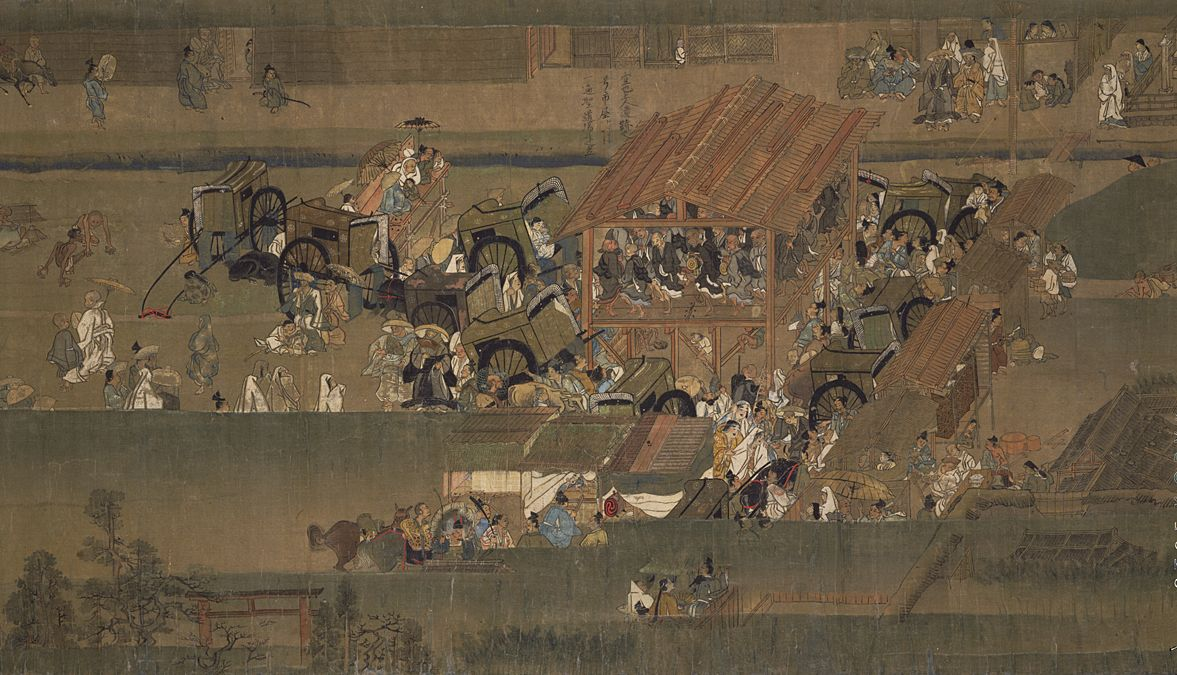
Illustrated Biography of the Priest Ippen, Volume 7, handscroll detail. Color on silk. Size of the full scroll: 37.8 cm x 802.0 cm.

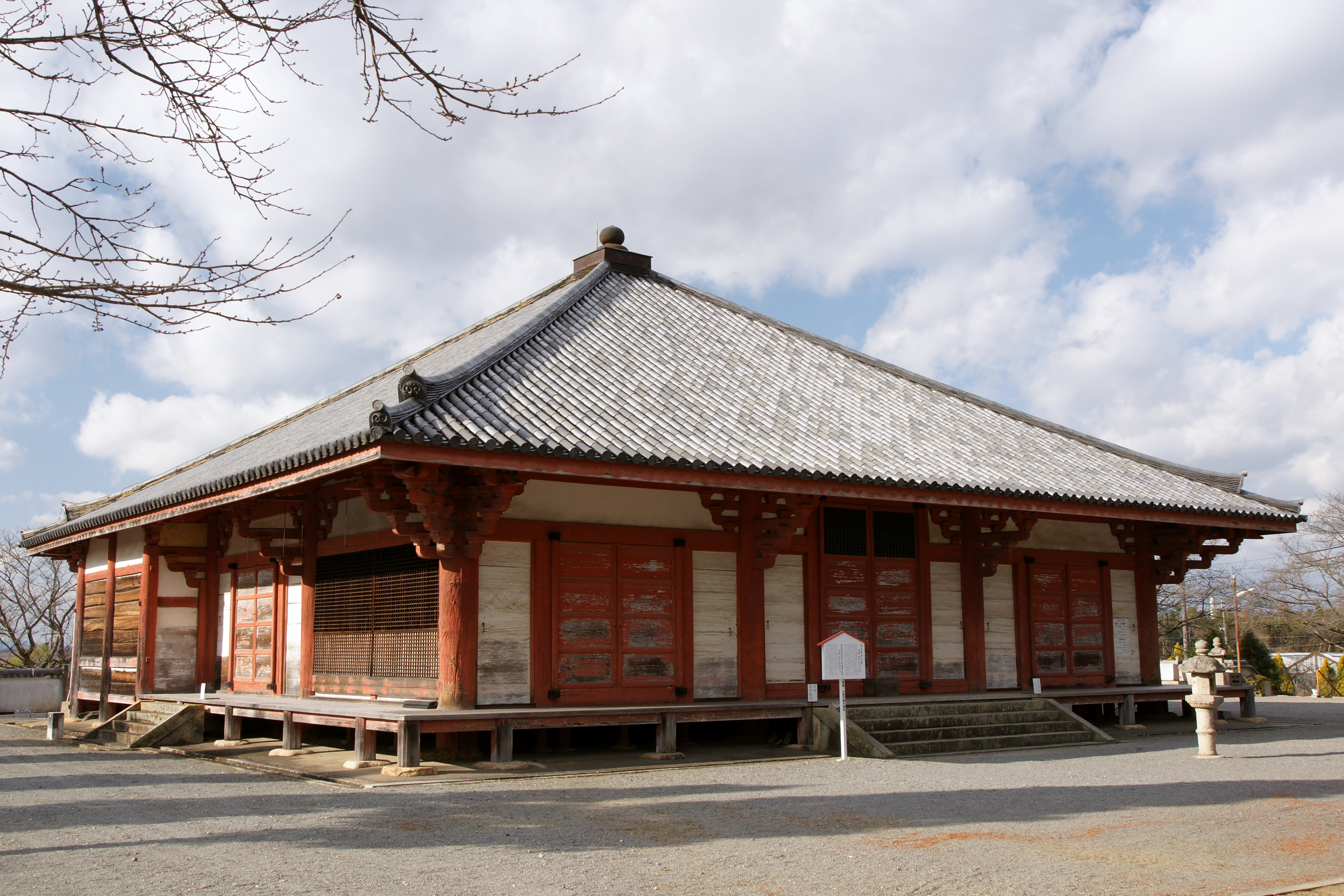
Jōdo-dō of Jōdo-ji in Ono. It was built in 1194.

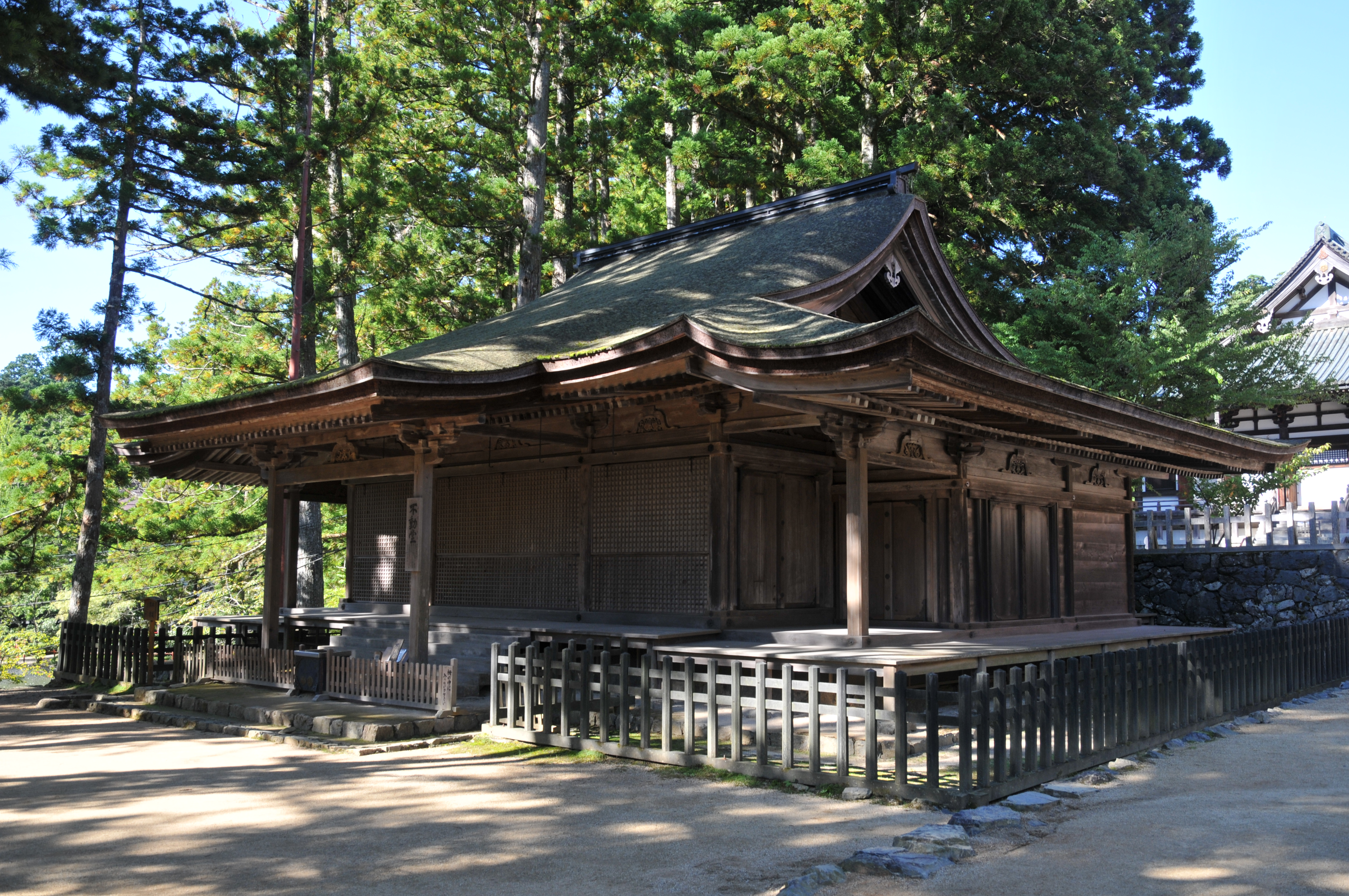
Danjogaran Fudodo in Mt. Kōya. It was built in 1197.

== Muromachi period (1333–1573) ==
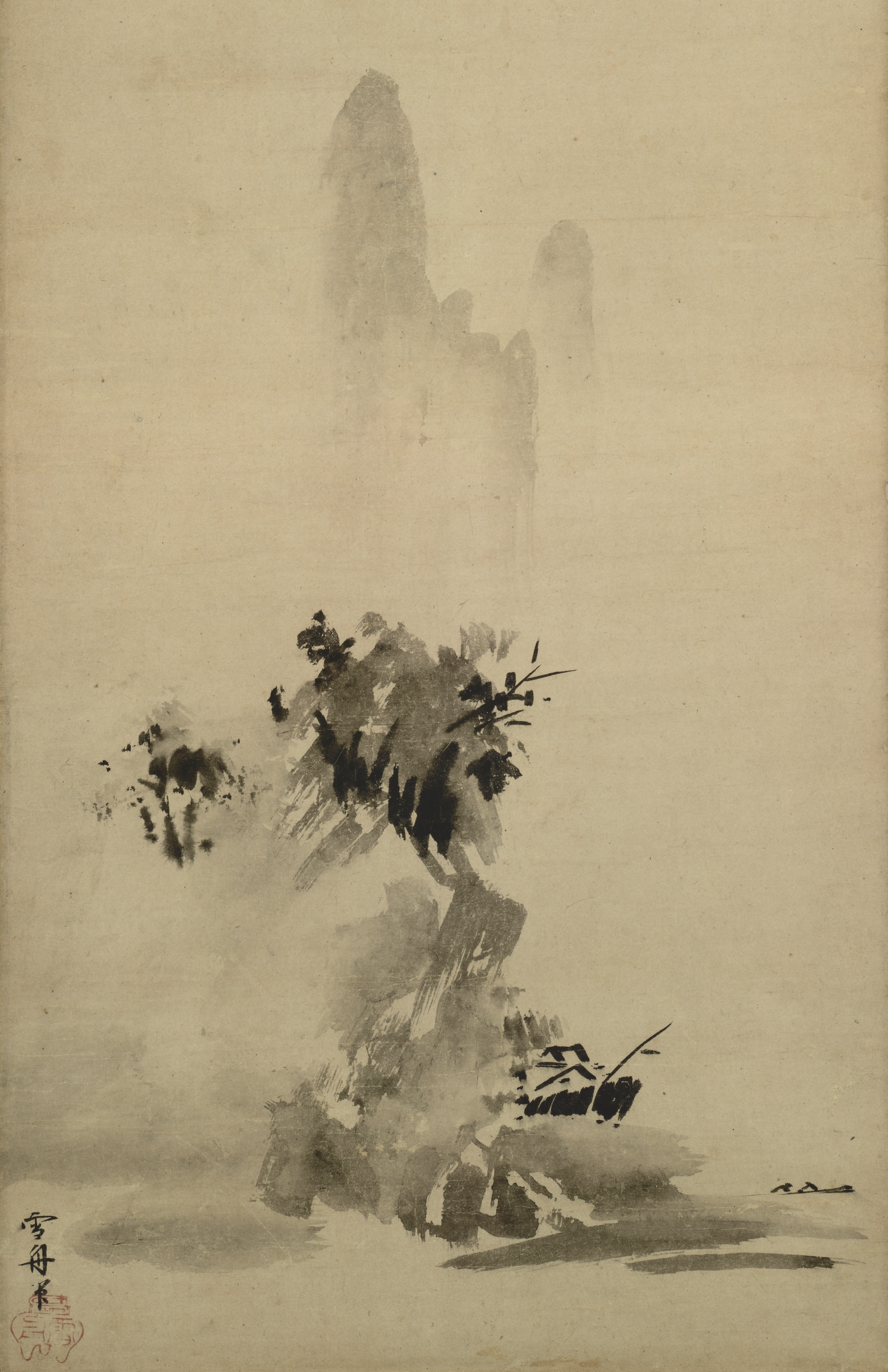
Splashed-ink Landscape (破墨山水, Haboku sansui), Sesshū, 1495, ink on silk, 148.6 × 32.7 cm

During the Muromachi period, also called the Ashikaga period, a profound change took place in Japanese culture. The Ashikaga clan took control of the shogunate and moved its headquarters back to Kyoto, to the Muromachi district of the city. With the return of government to the capital, the popularizing trends of the Kamakura period came to an end, and cultural expression took on a more aristocratic, elitist character. During the Muromachi period, Zen Buddhism rose to prominence especially among the elite Samurai class, who embraced the Zen values of personal discipline, concentration and self-development.

The development of the great Zen monasteries in Kamakura and Kyoto had a major impact on the visual arts. Because of secular ventures and trading missions to China organized by Zen temples, many Chinese paintings and objects of art were imported into Japan and profoundly influenced Japanese artists working for Zen temples and the shogunate. Not only did these imports change the subject matter of painting, but they also modified the use of color; the bright colors of Yamato-e yielded to the monochromes of painting in the Chinese manner of Sui-boku-ga (水墨画) or sumi-e (墨絵), this style mainly used only black ink – the same as used in East Asian calligraphy.

Detail of "Reading in a Bamboo Grove", 1446, Shūbun

The foremost painter of the new Sumi-e style was Sesshū Tōyō (1420–1506), a Rinzai priest who traveled to China in 1468–69 and studied contemporary Ming painting. Some of his most dramatic works are in the Chinese splashed-ink (Haboku) style. Upon returning to Japan, Sesshū built himself a studio and established a large following, painters that are now referred to as the Unkoku-rin school or "School of Sesshū". To make one of the calligraphic and highly stylized Haboku paintings, the painter would visualize the image and then made swift broad strokes into the paper resulting in a splashed and abstract composition, all done with meditative concentration. This impressionistic style of painting was supposed to capture the true nature of the subject. The Sumi-e style was highly influenced by calligraphy, using the same tools and style as well as its zen philosophy. To paint in this style the practitioner had to clear his mind and apply the brush strokes without too much thinking, termed mushin (無心, "no mind state") by the Japanese philosopher Nishida Kitaro. The concept of mushin is central to many Japanese arts including the art of the sword, archery and the tea ceremony.

By the end of the 14th century, monochrome landscape paintings (sansuiga) had found patronage by the ruling Ashikaga family and was the preferred genre among Zen painters, gradually evolving from its Chinese roots to a more Japanese style. Another important painter in this period is Tenshō Shūbun, a monk at the Kyoto temple of Shōkoku-ji who traveled to Korea and studied under Chinese painters. He returned to Japan in 1404 and settled in Kyoto, then the capital city. He became director of the court painting bureau, established by Ashikaga shoguns, who were influential art patrons. Shūbun's most well-known landscape painting, designated as a National Treasure in Japan, is Reading in a Bamboo Grove, now kept in the Tokyo National Museum.

Catching catfish with a gourd, (Hyōnen-zu, 瓢鮎図), ink on paper, 111.5 × 75.8 cm, Myōshin-ji temple, Taizō-in, Kyoto.

Another style which developed in the Muromachi period is Shigajiku (詩画軸). This is usually a painting accompanied by poetry and has its roots in China, where painting and poetry were seen as inherently connected. This style grew out of literary circles, an artist would usually be given a subject to paint and the poets would write accompanying verses to be written above the work. A famous example is the scroll "Catching a Catfish with a Gourd" (Hyōnen-zu 瓢鮎図) located at Taizō-in, Myōshin-ji, Kyoto. Created by the priest-painter Josetsu (c. 1386 – c. 1428), it includes 31 verses of many Zen priests inscribed above the painting. In the foreground of the painting a man is depicted on the bank of a stream holding a small gourd and looking at a large slithery catfish. Mist fills the middle ground, and the background, mountains appear to be far in the distance. The painting was commissioned by the 4th shogun of the Muromachi period, Ashikaga Yoshimochi (1386–1428), and was based on the nonsensical riddle "How do you catch a catfish with a gourd?". An example of one of the Koans illustrates the style of the poetry inscribed above the painting.

Poised! With the Gourd
He tries to pin that slippery fish.
Some oil on the gourd
Would add zest to the chase.
(Shusu [1423] Trans. Matsushita, 1974)

The painting and accompanying poems capture both the playfulness and the perplexing nature of Zen buddhist kōans which was supposed to aid the Zen practitioner in his meditation and was a central practice of the Rinzai school.

In the late Muromachi period, ink painting had migrated out of the Zen monasteries into the art world in general, as artists from the Kano school and the Ami school adopted the style and themes, but introducing a more plastic and decorative effect that would continue into modern times.

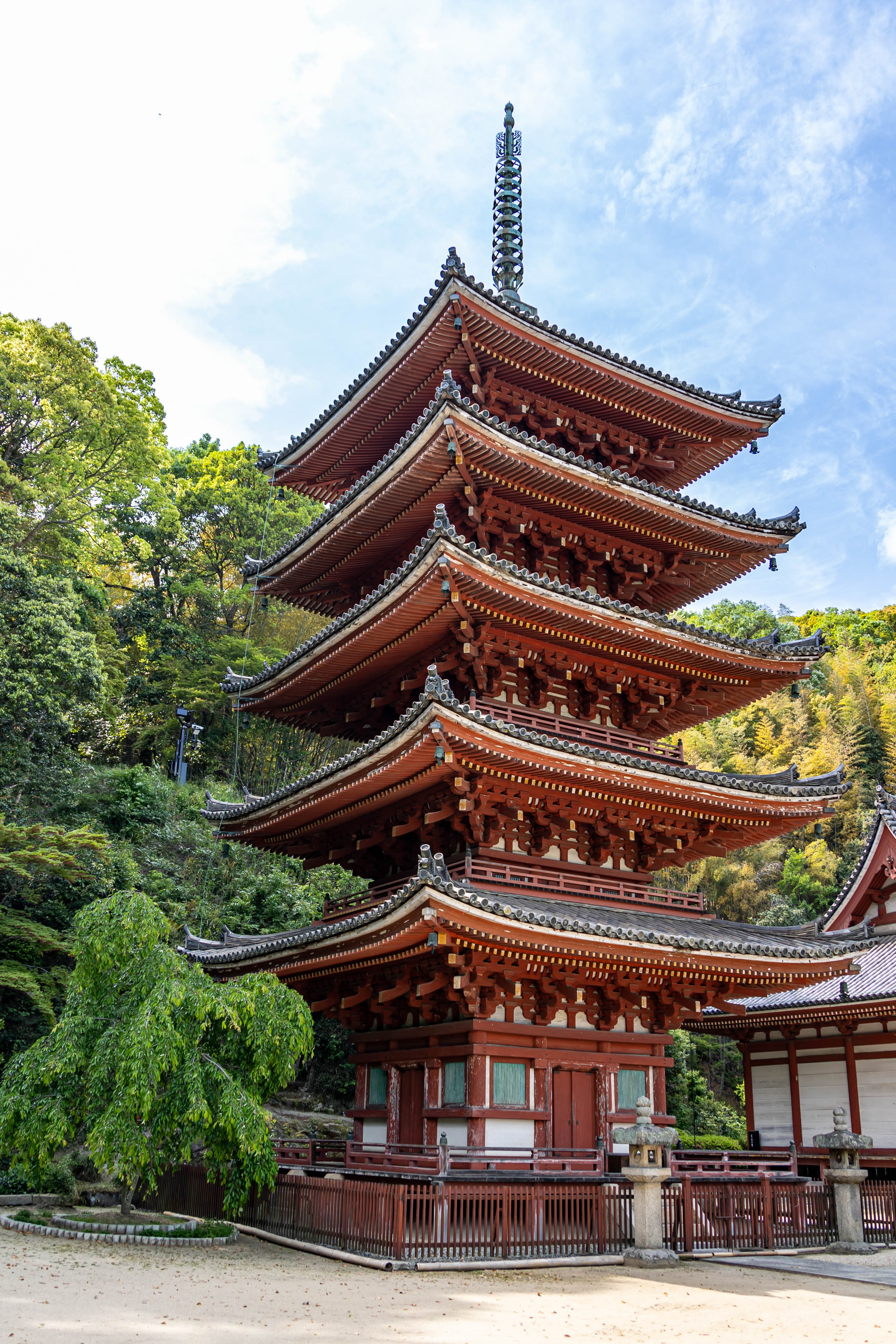
Pagoda of Myōō-in in Fukuyama. It was built in 1348.

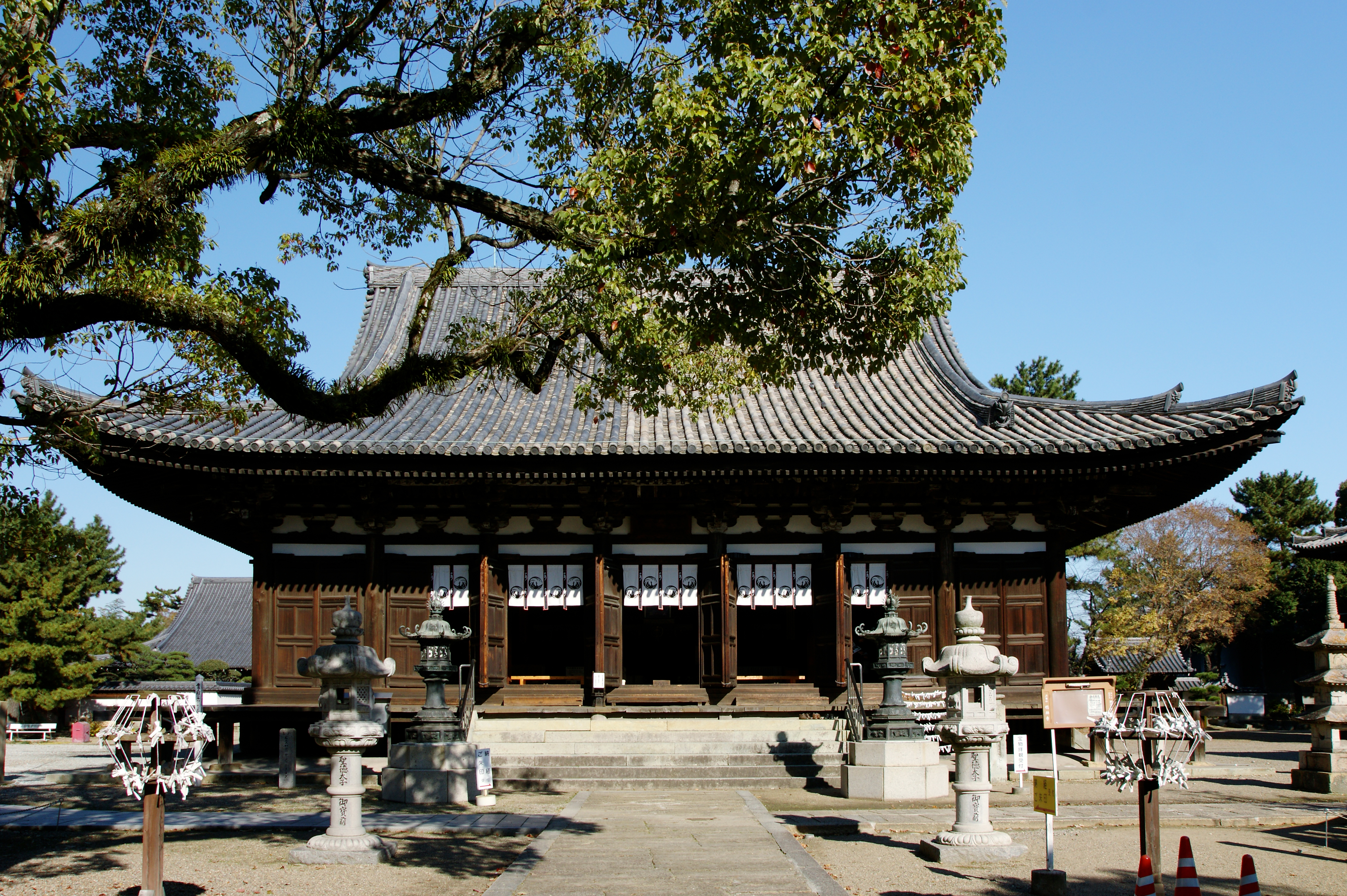
Main Hall of Kakurin-ji in Kakogawa. It was built in 1397.

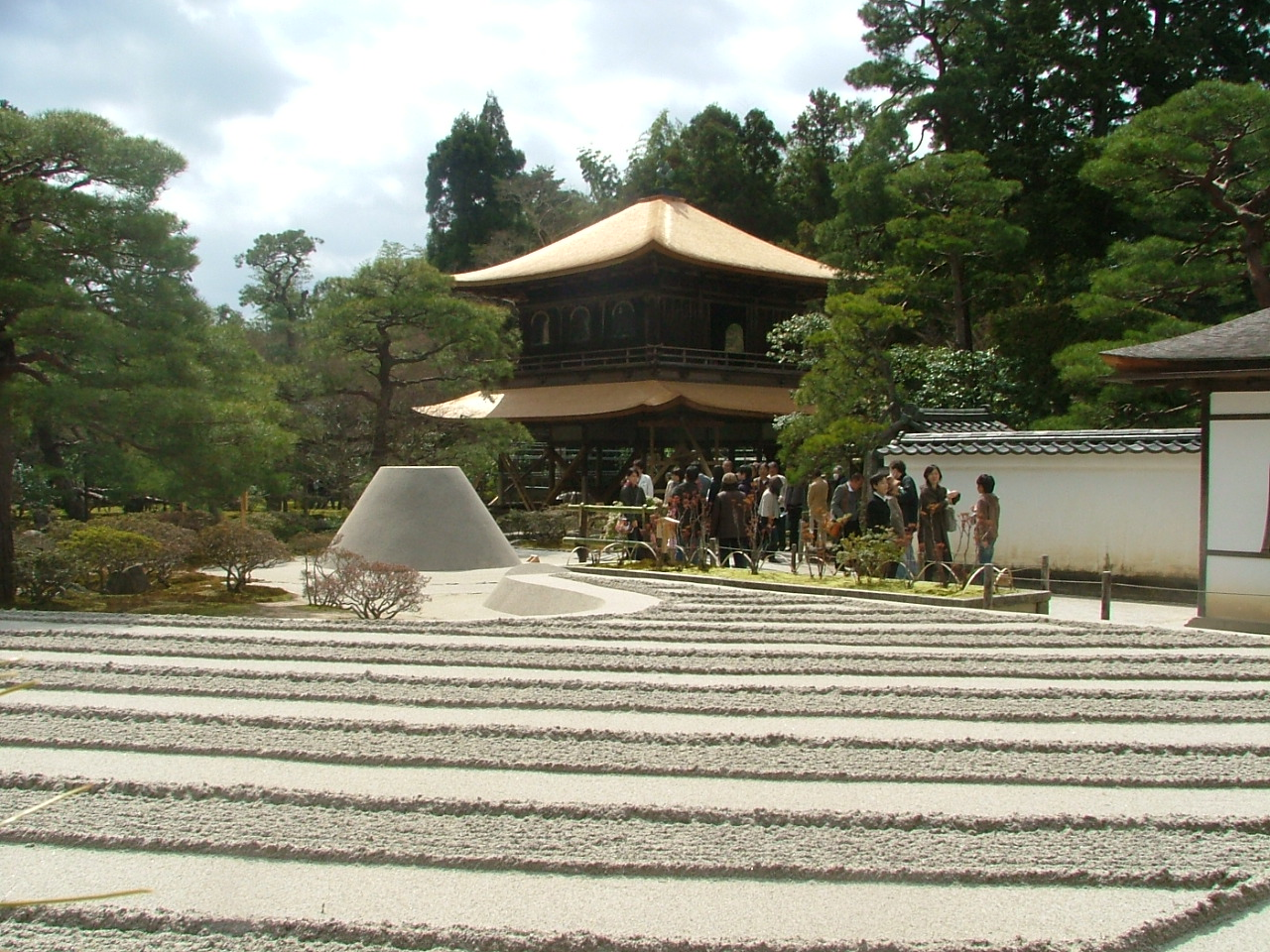
The Silver Pavilion of Ginkaku-ji in Kyoto. It was built in 1489 (Art of Wabi-sabi, Higashiyama Bunka).

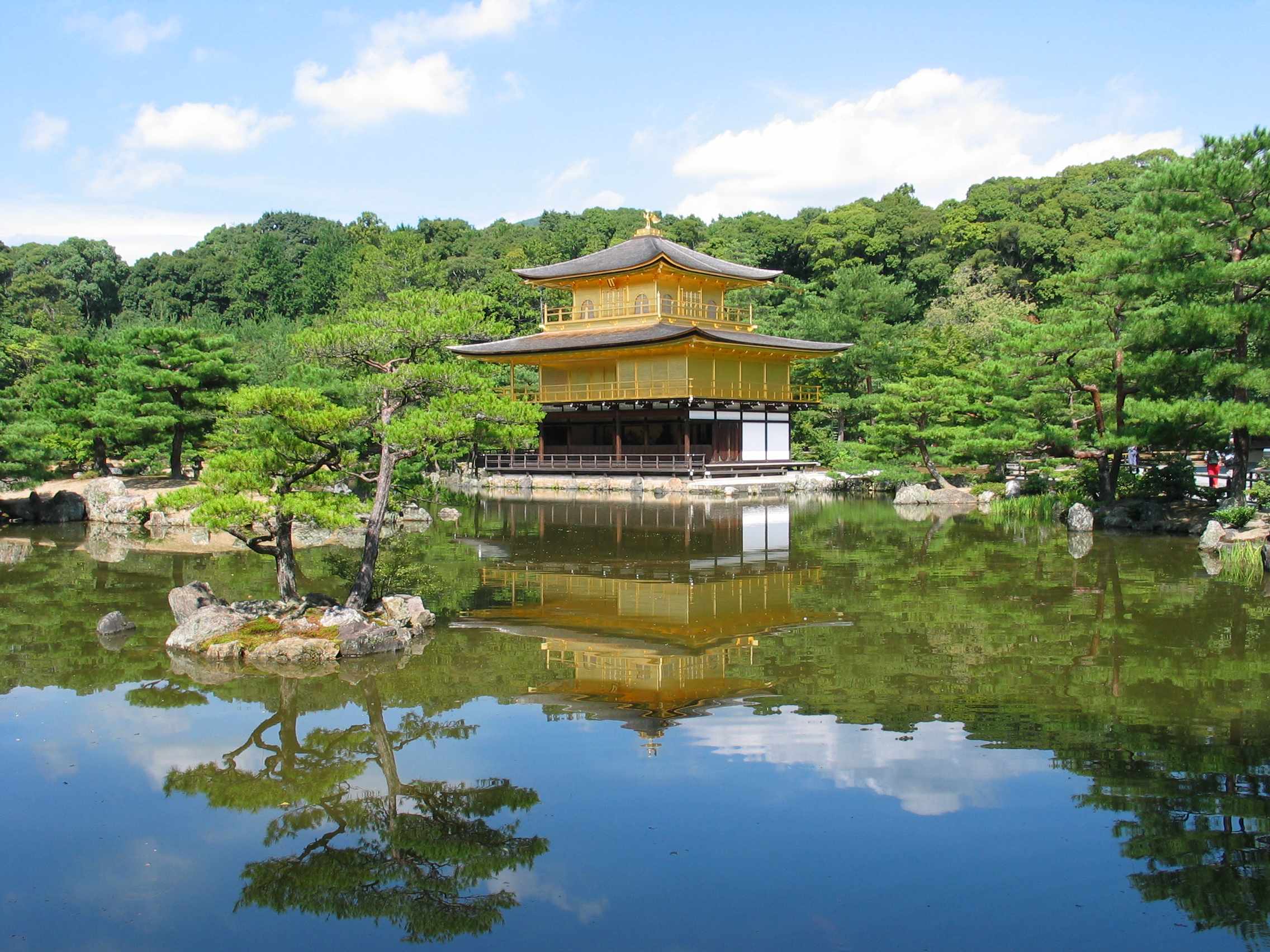
Garden of Kinkaku-ji in Kyoto (Art of Miyabi, Kitayama Bunka)

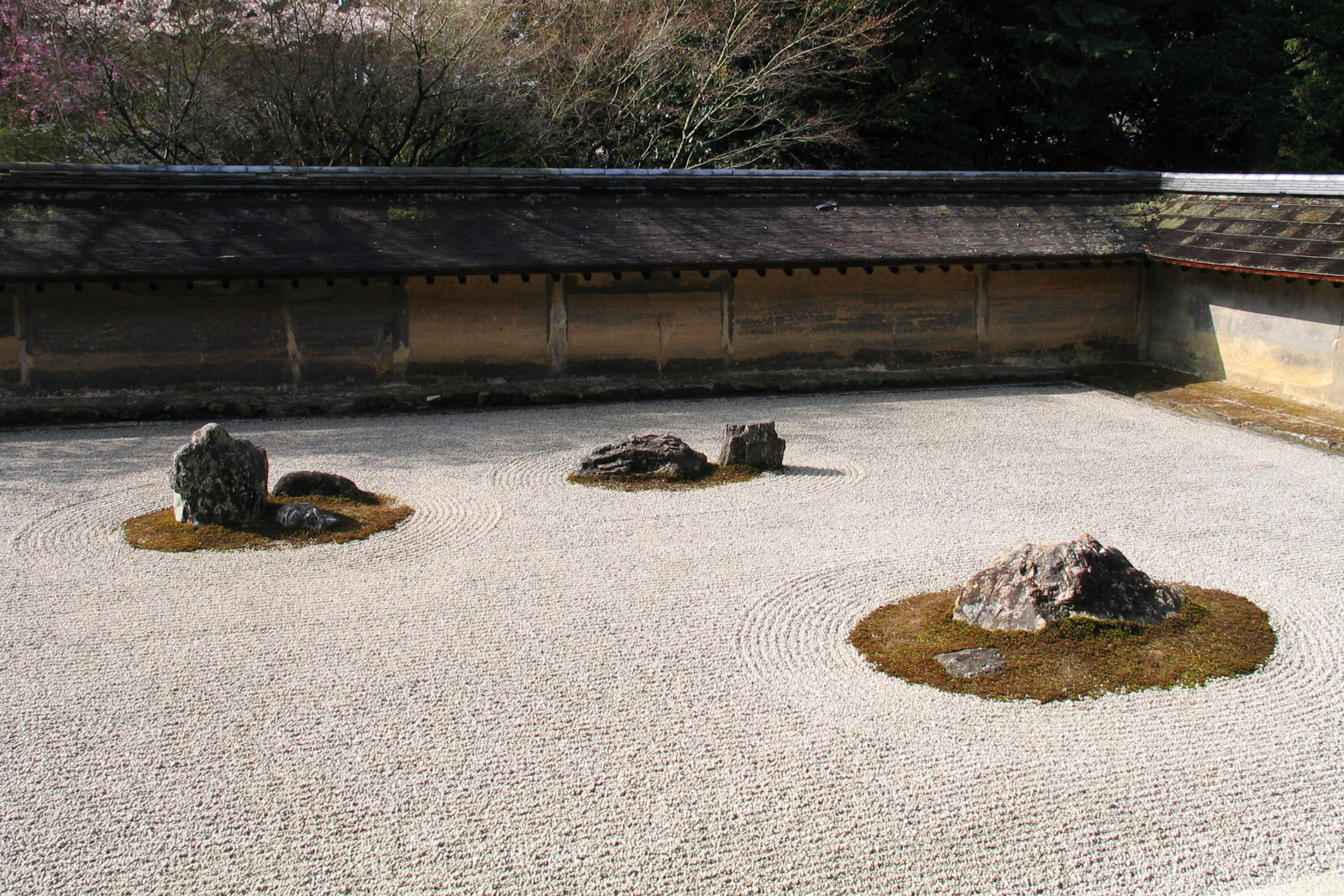
Ryōan-ji dry garden in Kyoto

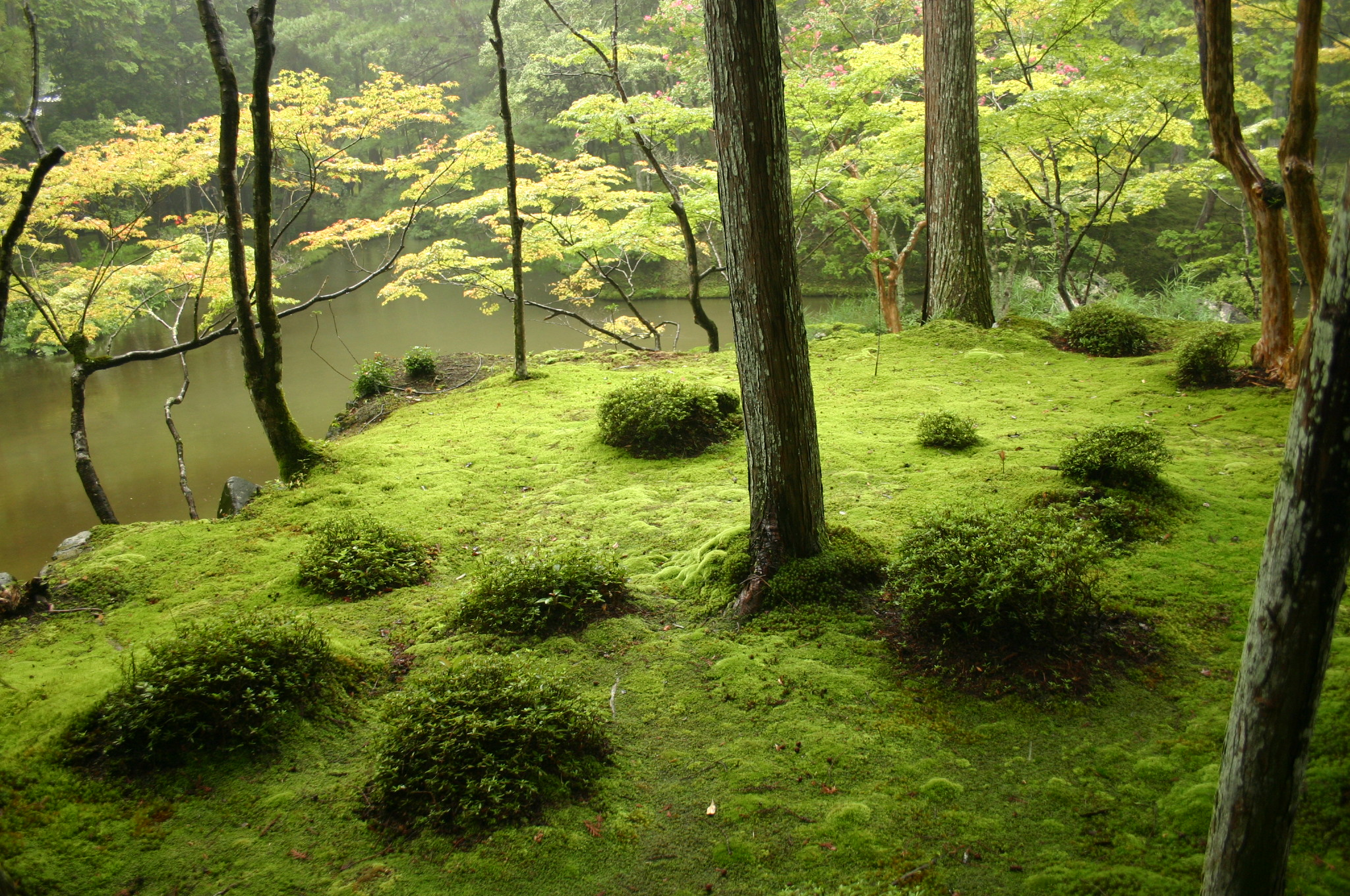
Garden of Saihō-ji in Kyoto

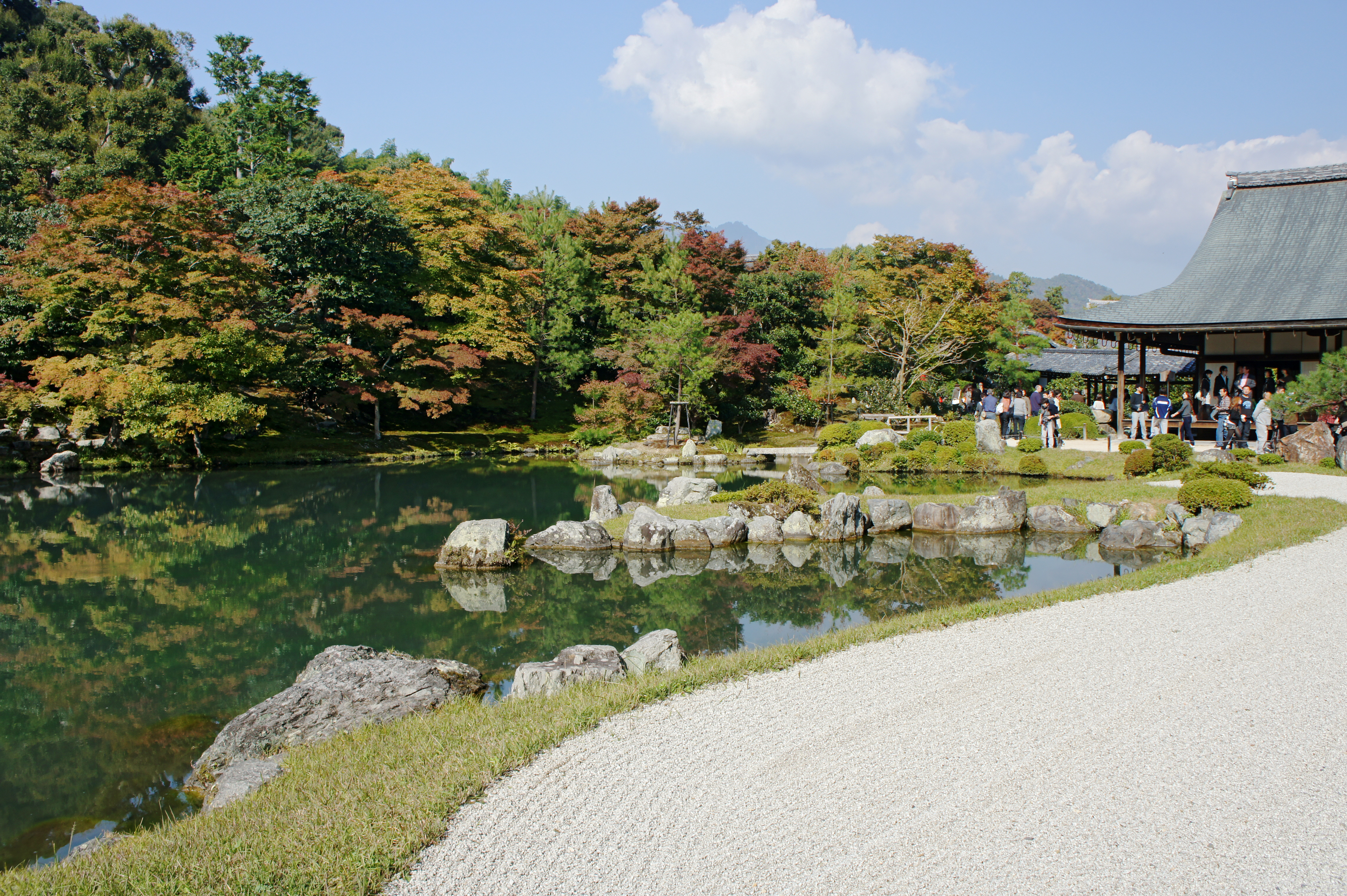
Garden of Tenryū-ji in Kyoto

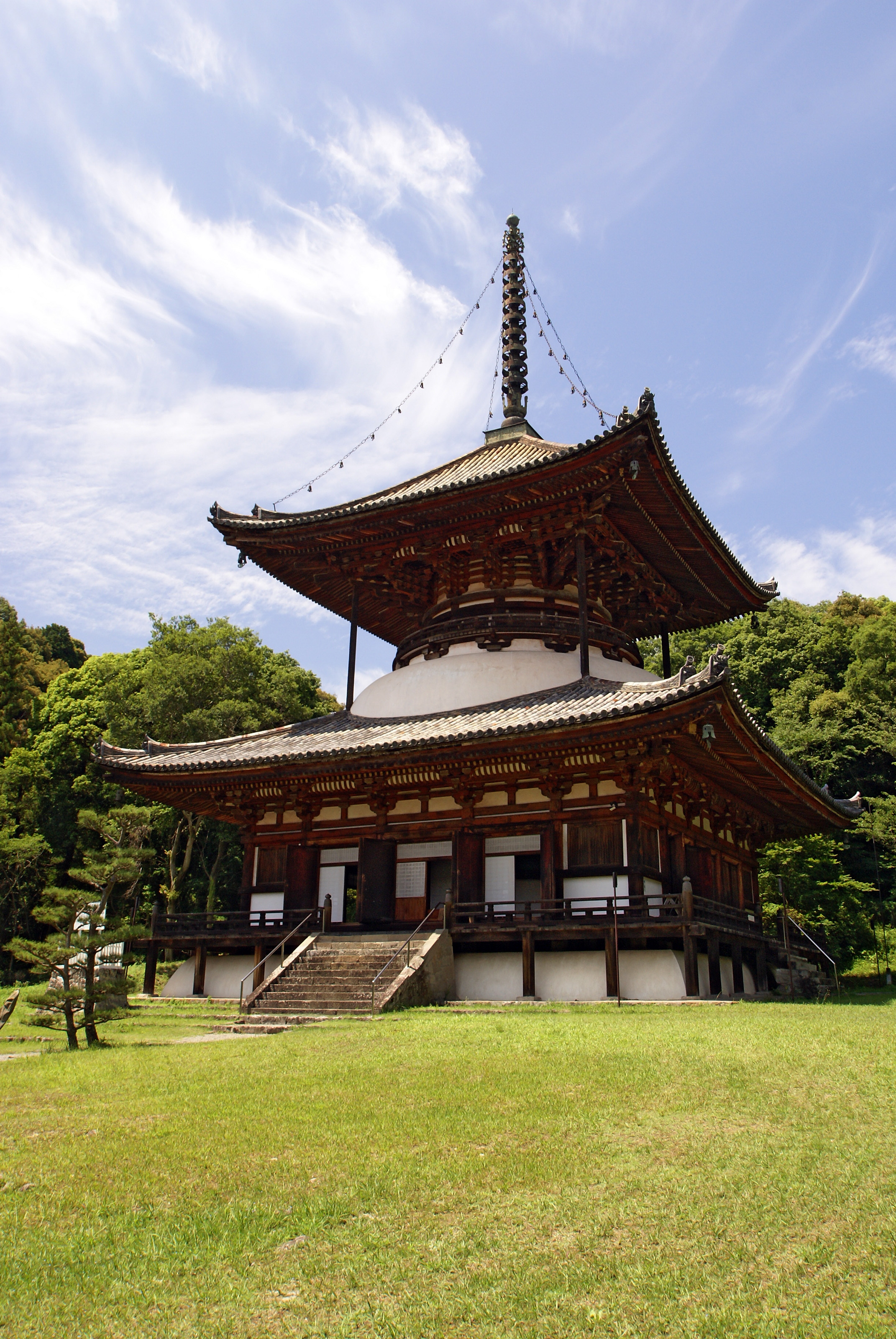
Pagoda of Negoro-ji in Iwade, Wakayama. It was built in 1547.

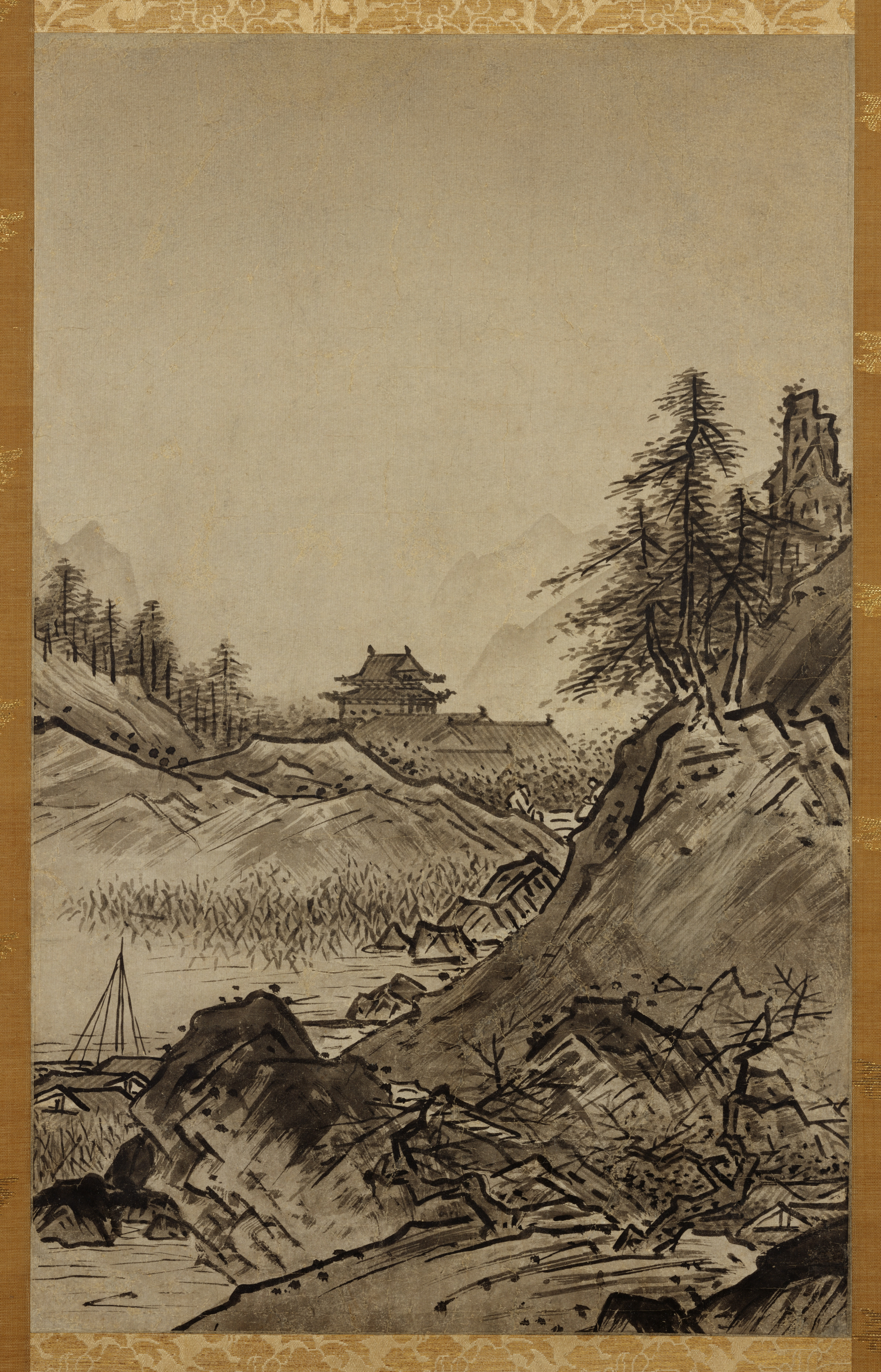
Autumn and Winter Landscapes by Sesshū

Huike Offering His Arm to Bodhidharma (1496) by Sesshū

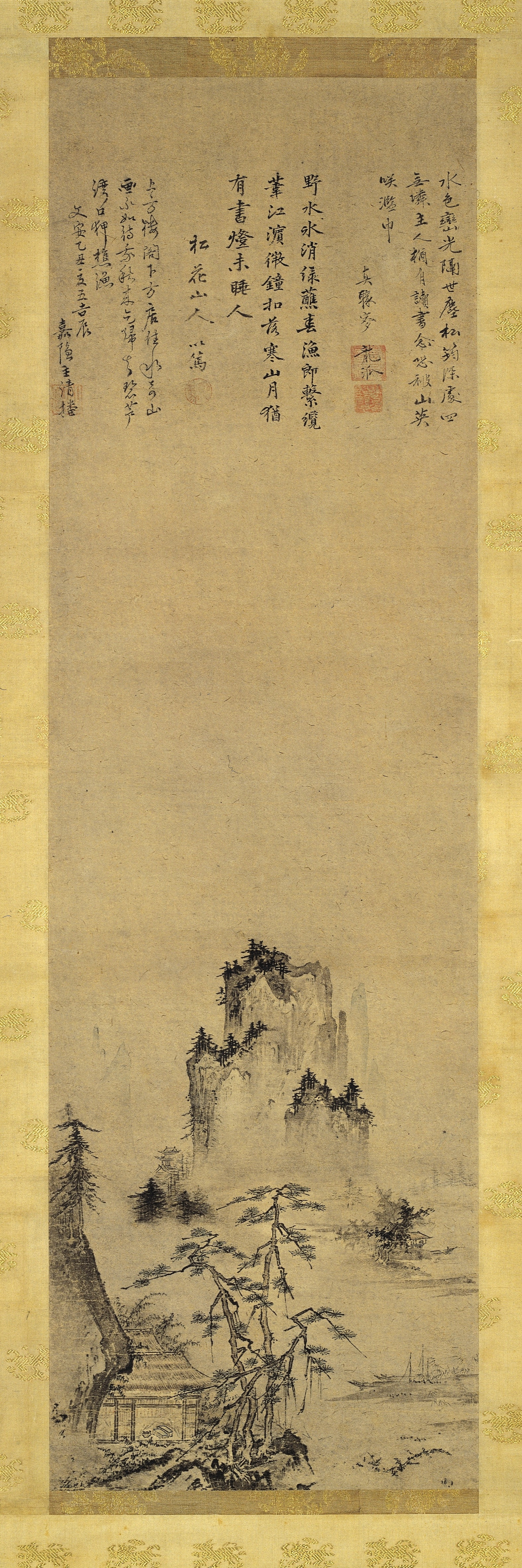
Landscape by Shubun, Hanging scroll, 108 cm x 32.7 cm. Ink and light color on paper, 1445. Located in the Nara National Museum.

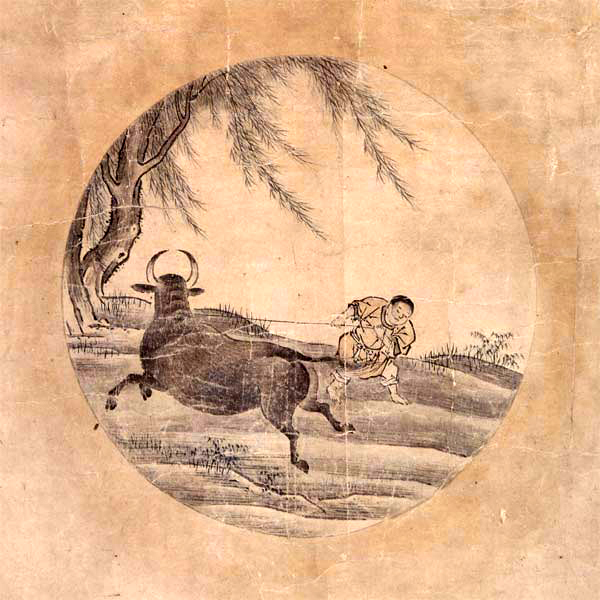
Getting Hold of the Ox, one of the Ten Oxherding pictures by Shubun, 15th-century copy of lost 12th-century original

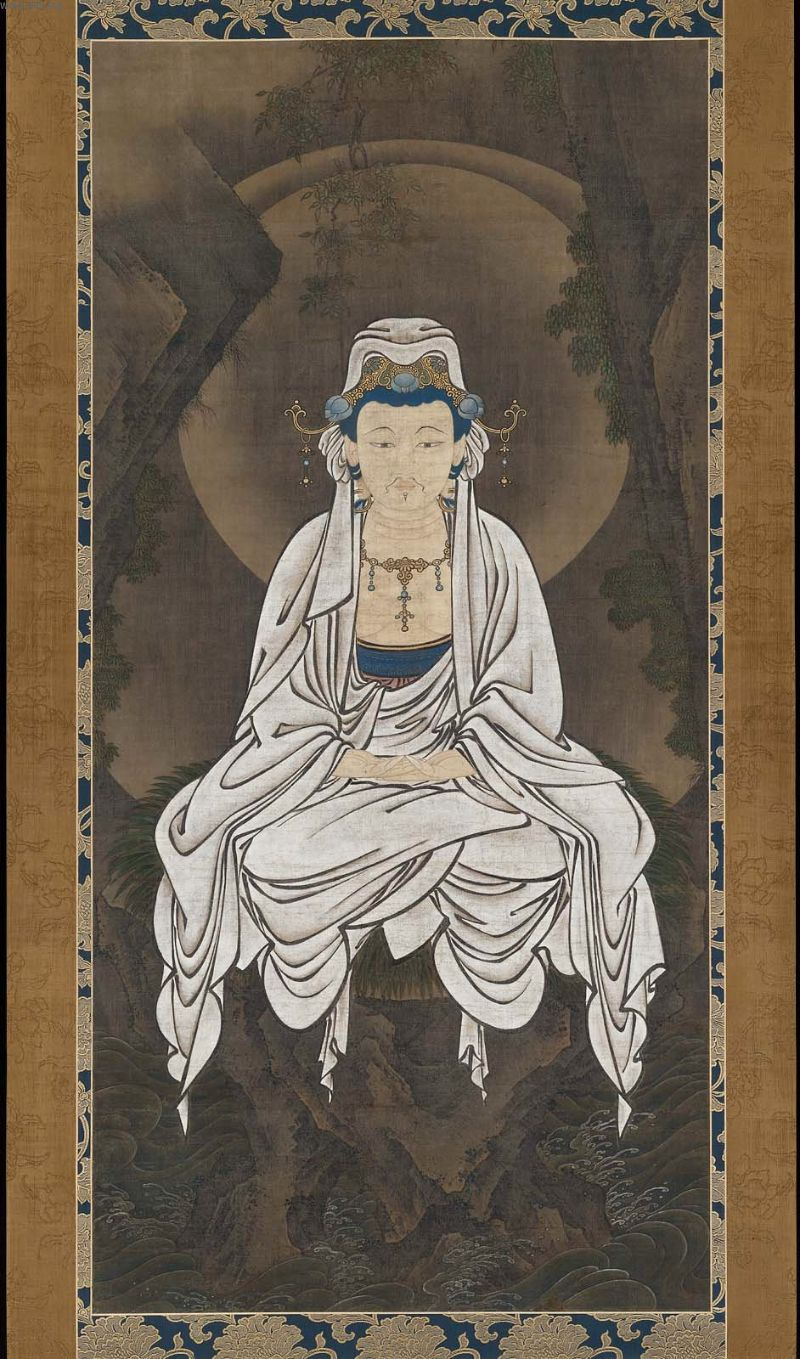
Kano Motonobu, White-robed Kannon, c. first half of the 16th century. Hanging scroll. Ink, color and gold on silk. 157.2 x 76.4 cm.

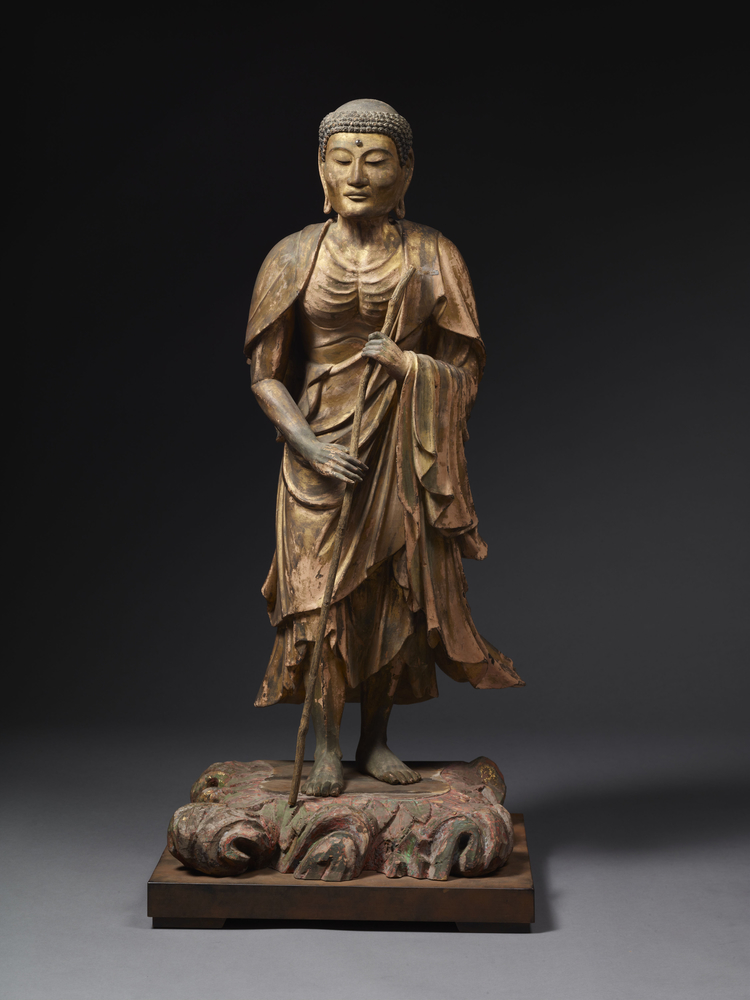
Śākyamuni coming out of the mountains. 15th–16th century. Nara National Museum

== Azuchi–Momoyama period (1573–1603) ==
Left panel of the Pine Trees screen (松林図 屏風, Shōrin-zu byōbu) by Hasegawa Tōhaku, c.1595

Azuchi–Momoyama period saw the rise of the Kanō school (狩野派 Kanō-ha?) which is one of the most famous schools of Japanese painting. The Kanō school of painting was the dominant style of painting until the Meiji period. It was founded by Kanō Masanobu (1434–1530), a contemporary of Sesshū and student of Shūbun who became an official painter in the Shogun's court. The artists who followed him including his son improved upon his style and methods. His son, Kanō Motonobu (1476–1559) established the Kano style as the main Japanese painting school during the Muromachi period.

In sharp contrast to the previous Muromachi period, the Azuchi Momoyama period was characterized by a grandiose polychrome style, with extensive use of gold and silver foil, and by works on a very large scale. Kanō school painters were patronized by Oda Nobunaga, Toyotomi Hideyoshi, Tokugawa Ieyasu, and their followers. Kanō Eitoku developed a formula for the creation of monumental landscapes on the sliding doors enclosing a room. These huge screens and wall paintings were commissioned to decorate the castles and palaces of the military nobility. This status continued into the subsequent Edo period, as the Tokugawa bakufu continued to promote the works of the Kanō school as the officially sanctioned art for the shōgun, daimyōs, and Imperial court. The rise of the Kanō school saw a beginning of a move away from buddhist themes, as Kano school patrons commissioned paintings of a more secular nature to decorate their palaces.

However some painters in this period continued to look back to the Buddhist priest-painters which had initially influenced the Kano school. One of these painters was Hasegawa Tōhaku, who was influenced by the monochrome ink paintings of the Muromachi painter Sesshū and developed his own style of Sumi-e which looked back to the minimalism of its predecessors. Tōhaku was in fact so much enamored with the techniques of Sesshū Tōyō that he attempted to claim rights as his fifth successor, though he lost in a court battle to Unkoku Togan. Still, the influence of Sesshū is evident in many of Tōhaku's mid to late works, such as his famous Shōrin-zu byōbu (松林図 屏風) Pine Trees screen, which were declared a national treasure of Japan are argued to be the first paintings of their scale to depict only pine trees as subject matter.

The school founded by Hasegawa Tōhaku is known today as the Hasegawa school. This school was small, consisting mostly of Tōhaku and his sons. However small, its members conserved Tōhaku's quiet and reserved aesthetic, which many attribute to the influence of Sesshū as well as his contemporary and friend, Sen no Rikyū. It is suspected that these simple aesthetics protest the usage of intimidation and wealth rampant in the Kanō school.

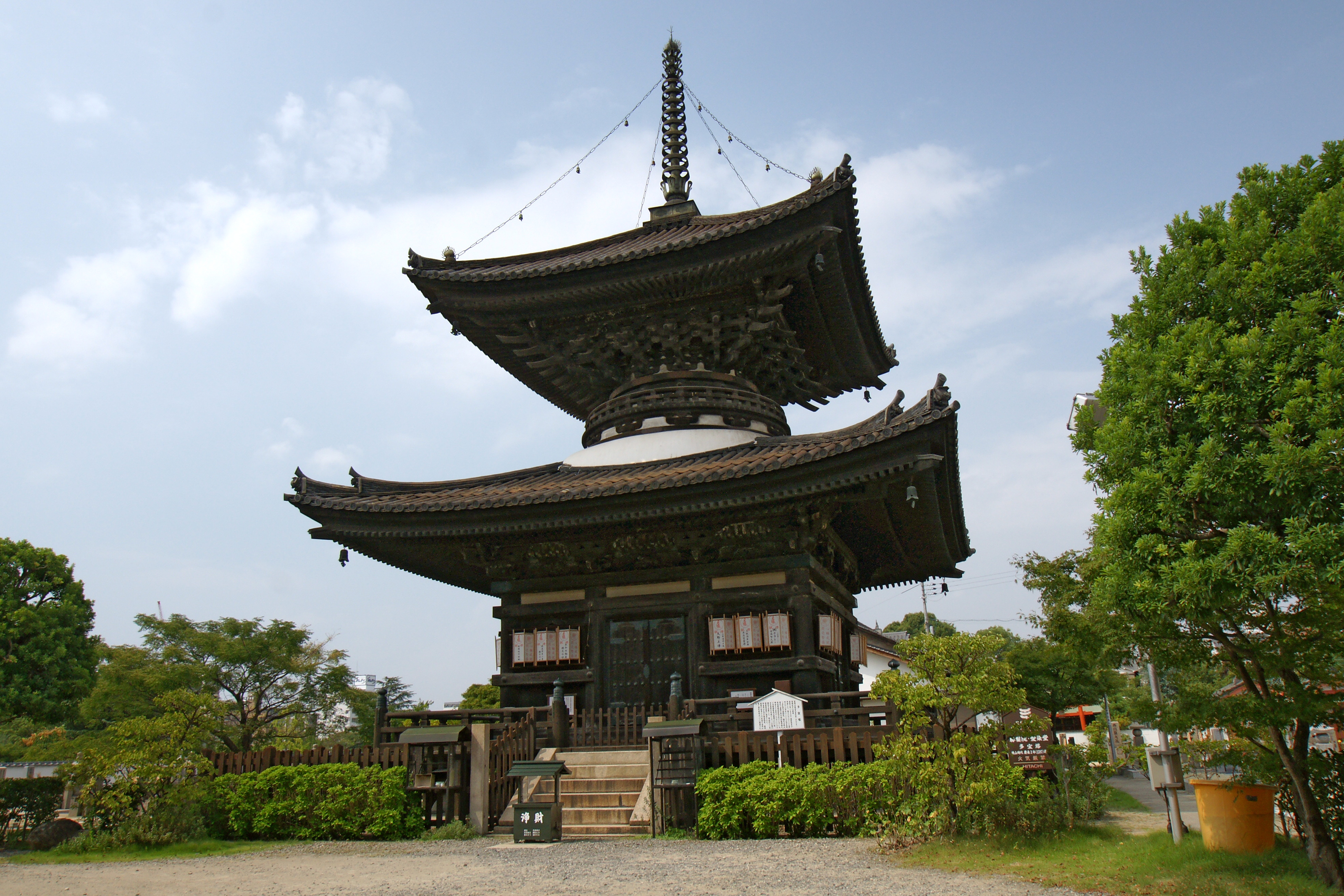
Pagoda of Shoman-in in Osaka. It was rebuilt in 1597.

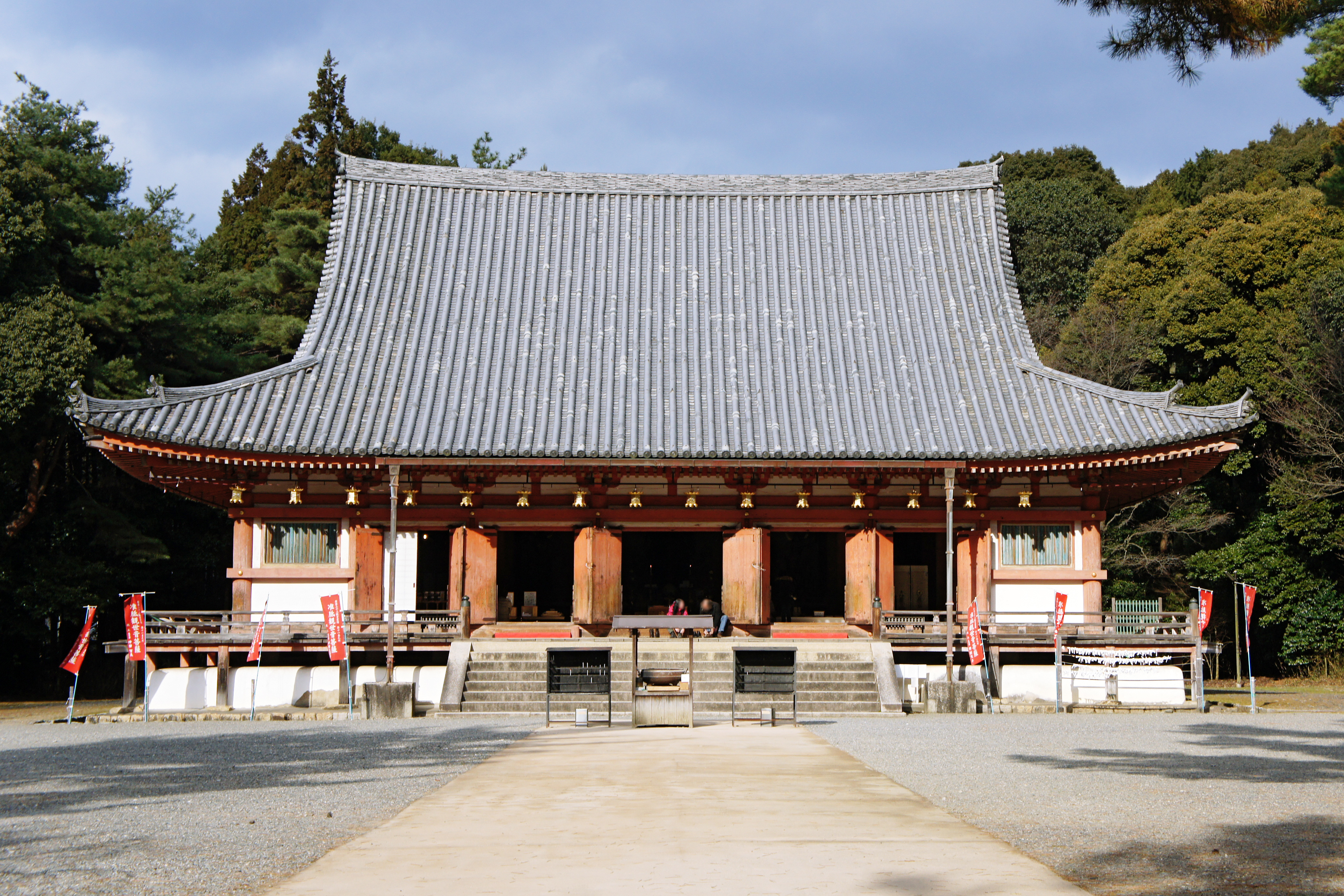
Golden Hall of Daigo-ji in Kyoto. It was rebuilt in 1600.

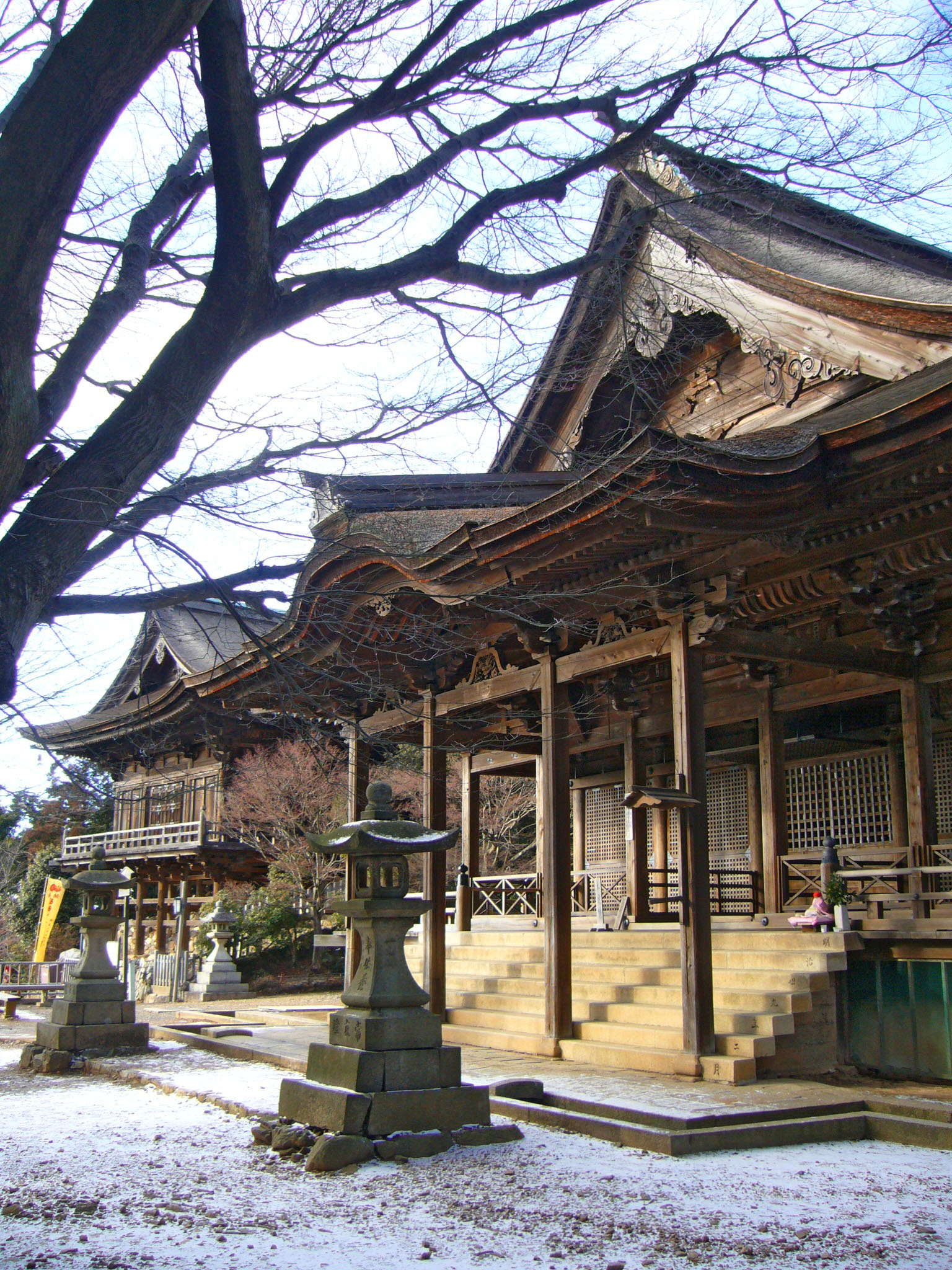
Kaizando and Nyoirindo of Daigo-ji in Kyoto. They were rebuilt in 1606.

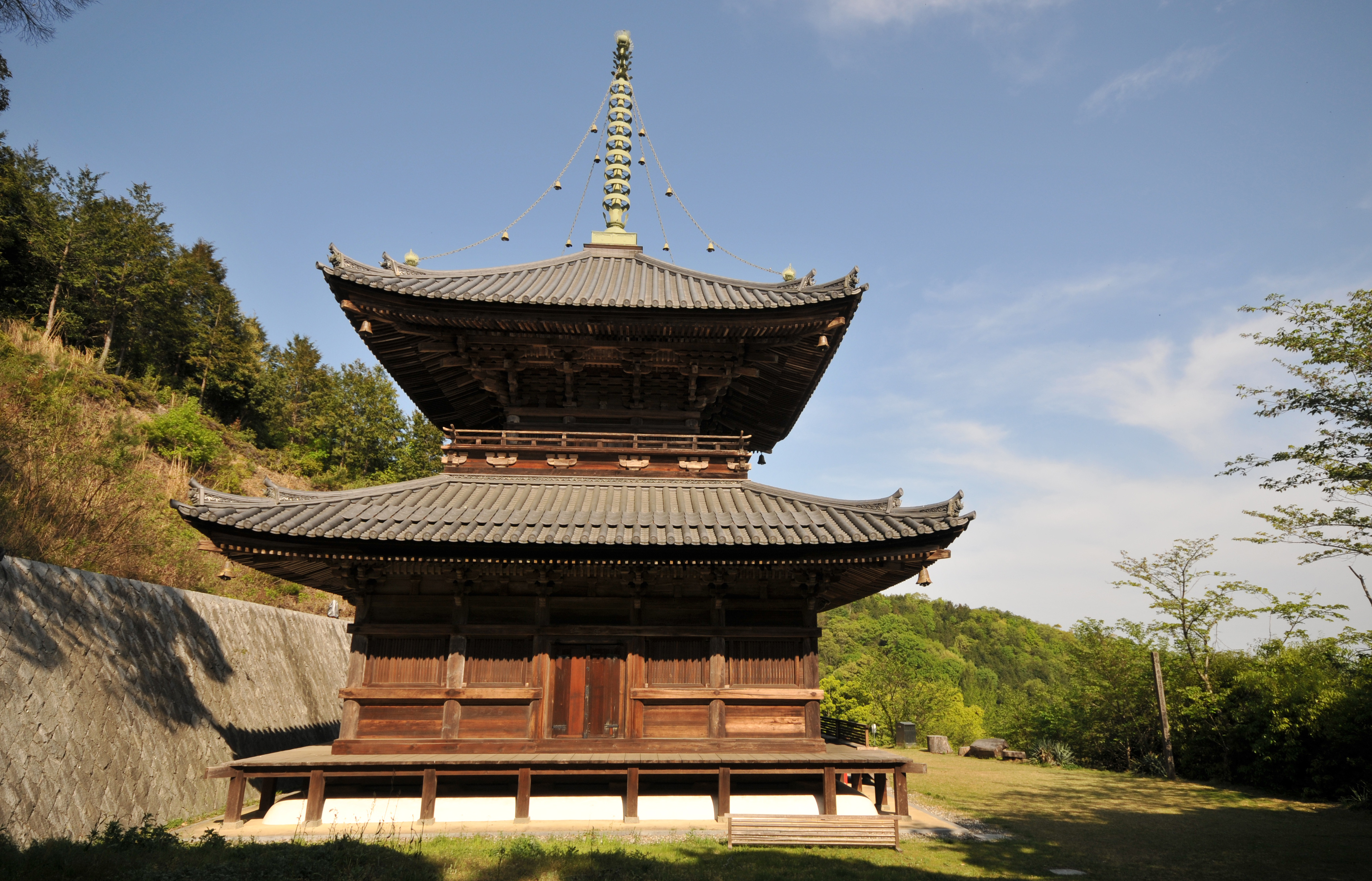
Pagoda of Kirihata-ji in Awa. It was built in 1607.

=== Zen art ===
The Zen sect of Buddhism became very popular in Japan in the 14th and 15th centuries. As a result, portraiture rose in popularity, specifically portraits of Zen priests. Zen Buddhism promotes simplicity and less involved in worship; therefore, religious paintings were not needed. Instead, Zen priests often painted images of teachers and Zen masters. The most iconographic master in zen art is the meditating Daruma. Daruma was the Indian monk who founded this branch of Buddhism and served as the first zen patriarch. He is usually rendered with a cloak, beard, and tan. He is typically meditating (as meditation is central to zen Buddhism) and is without arms and legs. In addition, he is also rendered with wide eyes, as legend holds that he tore off his eyelids.

== Meiji period ==
In the Meiji period in the late 19th century, the Tokugawa shogunate transferred sovereignty to the emperor and the new government began to govern the country. In 1868, the new government banned the traditional syncretism of Shinto and Buddhism and ordered them to separate Buddhist temples and Shinto shrines in order to establish a centralized government by the emperor, who was the supreme priest of Shinto. In response to this situation, some Shinto priests started to destroy Buddhist temples. Okakura Tenshin and others worked hard in political activities to protect Buddhist art, and the government declared that it would protect Buddhism. The destruction stopped around 1874, but many precious Buddhist arts were lost.

== Architecture ==
Buddhism exerted tremendous influence on Japanese art in a variety of ways and through many periods of Japanese history. Buddhist temples with their halls and five-story towers were built all over Japan, and huge sculptures of Buddha were made for these temples.

== See also ==
- Japanese art
- Japanese architecture
- Japanese sculpture
- Sumi-e
- Buddhism in Japan
- Buddhist temples in Japan
