= Ars Buddhica =

- Discipline: Buddhist art
- Language: Japanese

Publication details
- History: 1948 to present
- Publisher: Mainichi Shinbunsha (Japan)
- Frequency: Bi-monthly (at present)

Standard abbreviations
- ISO 4: Ars Buddhica

Indexing
- ISSN: 0004-2889

Ars Buddhica (佛教藝術, Bukkyō Geijutsu) (lit. 'Buddhist Art') is a bi-monthly academic journal of Buddhist art, particularly that of Japan. It is published in Japanese by Mainichi Shinbunsha.

== See also ==
- Buddhist art in Japan
