= Yamashita Shintarō =

Japanese yōga painter

- 山下新太郎
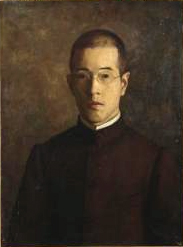
- Self-portrait (1904)
- Born: August 29, 1881; Arakawa, Tokyo, Japan
- Died: April 11, 1966 (aged 84); Minato, Tokyo, Japan
- Education: Tokyo School of Fine Arts
- Awards: Person of Cultural Merit, Order of the Rising Sun (3rd Class); Legion of Honour (Chevalier)

Yamashita Shintarō (山下新太郎) (29 August 1881 – 11 April 1966) was a Japanese yōga painter.

== Biography ==
Born in Tokyo, the eldest son in a family of picture framers, Yamashita Shintarō's schooling included English and Classical Chinese. He went on to study under Fujishima Takeji and Kuroda Seiki at Tokyo School of Fine Arts, graduating in 1904. After learning French at the Tokyo School of Foreign Languages, in 1905 he travelled via America to France, where he studied with Raphaël Collin and Fernand Cormon and at the École des Beaux-Arts. In 1907 he visited Spain, copying The Surrender of Breda by Velázquez, before returning to Paris via Granada and Seville. In 1908 "By the Window" was exhibited at the Salon; Reading and After Reading appearing the following year. In 1909 he travelled through Switzerland and Italy, visiting Milan, Venice, Florence, and Naples, Menton and Marseille. After returning to Paris, he painted Woman at her Shoes. The following summer he returned via the Suez Canal to Japan.

Shortly after returning he married. Later that year he exhibited for the first time at the Bunten, contributing Reading, After Reading, and Woman at her Shoes, winning third prize with Reading. He repeated the feat the following year with By the Window, which was acquired by the Ministry of Education, Science, and Culture. His first daughter was born in 1912 and first son in 1914. That same year, together with Ishii Hakutei (石井柏亭) and Arishima Ikuma, he founded the Nikakai (二科会) or "Society for Progressive Japanese Artists". He then travelled to Korea with Yuai Ichirō (湯浅一郎) and was commissioned by the Chosen Government Railway to paint murals for the Chosen Hotel (朝鮮ホテル), which he completed on a second trip the following year. Boys' Festival, featuring his eldest son aged ten months, was exhibited at the "Nikaten" exhibition at the Nihonbashi Mitsukoshi later in 1915.

In 1925 he assumed a leading role in the fine art division of the Bunka Gakuin. Two years later he contributed Poetry Party at the Imperial Palace to the Meiji Memorial Picture Gallery. In 1931, as judge at the Senten (朝鮮美術展覧会), he crossed again to Korea, travelling with Kobayashi Mango (小林万吾). Later that same year he left Kobe for France. While in Paris, he helped restore the Kanō school Namban byōbu known as "the Portuguese" at the Musée Guimet. After his return to Japan in 1932, he was awarded the Legion of Honour. That same year, he exhibited thirty-five works from his European travels at the Nikaten.

In 1935 he withdrew from the Nikakai and joined the Imperial Fine Arts Academy. The following year, together with Ishii Hakutei and Yasui Sōtarō, he founded the Issuikai (一水会). In 1937 he became a member of the reorganised Imperial Art Academy. In 1941 there was a special exhibition of his works in honour of his sixtieth birthday and he resigned from the Bunka Gakuin. In 1946 he exhibited at the first Nitten (日本美術展覧会). In 1955 he was selected as a Person of Cultural Merit. The following year there was an exhibition of his works at the Bridgestone Museum of Art. In 1961 he became an adviser to the Nitten. In 1964 he was decorated with the Order of the Rising Sun. Yamashita Shintarō died in 1966 at the age of 84.

== Select works ==
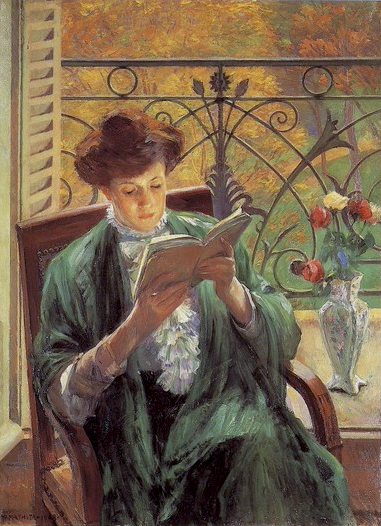
Reading (1908)

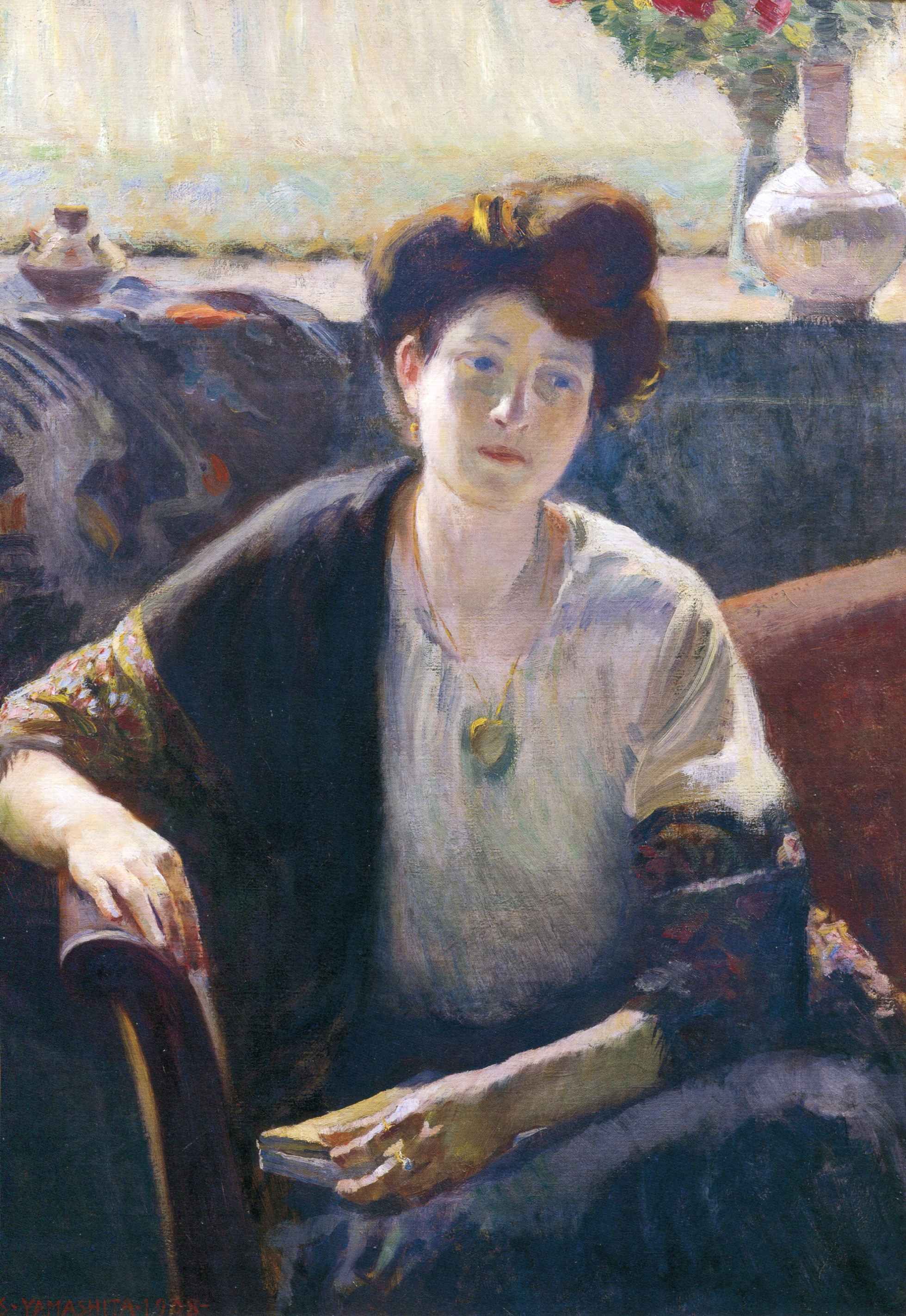
After Reading (1908)

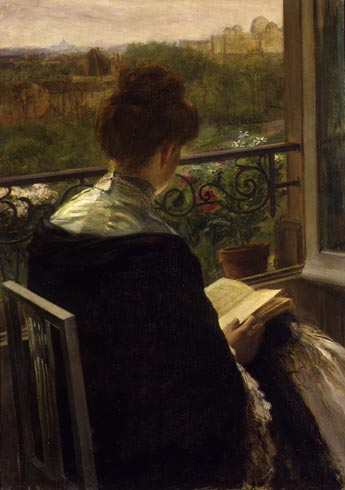
By the Window (1908)

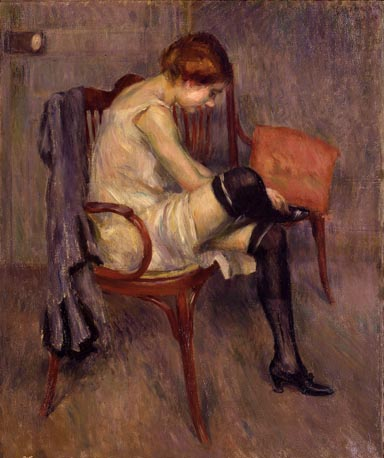
Woman at her Shoes (1909)

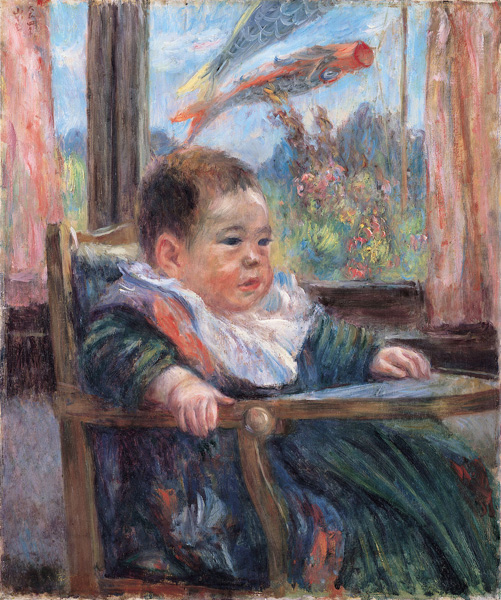
Boys' Festival (1915)

== See also ==
- List of Yōga painters
- Nakamura Tsune
