= Ishii Hakutei =

Japanese painter (1882–1958)

- 石井柏亭
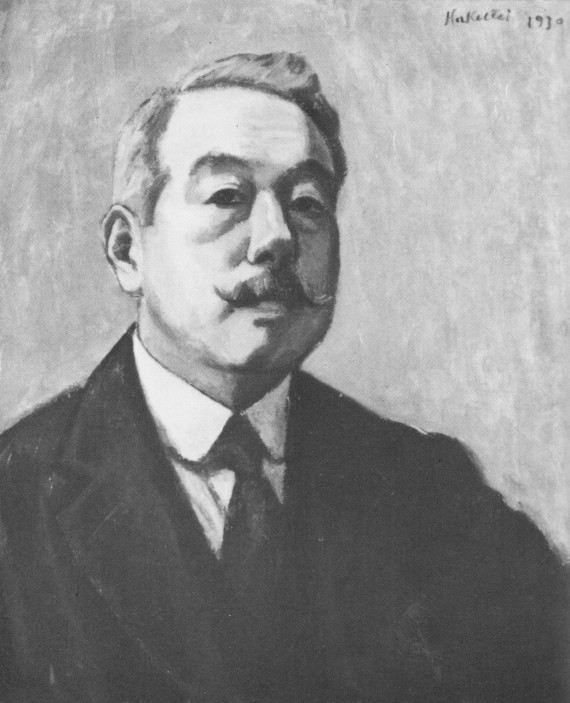
- Self-portrait
- Born: March 28, 1882; Taitō, Tokyo, Japan
- Died: December 29, 1958 (aged 76); Shinjuku, Tokyo, Japan
- Awards: Order of the Rising Sun (2nd class)

Ishii Hakutei (石井柏亭) (28 March 1882 – 29 December 1958) was a Japanese yōga painter.

== Biography ==
Born in Tokyo, the eldest son of nihonga artist Ishii Teiko (石井鼎湖), Ishii Hakutei first studied nihonga with his father, then yōga with Asai Chū and Nakamura Fusetsu (中村不折). He went on to study under Kuroda Seiki and Fujishima Takeji at Tokyo School of Fine Arts, but dropped out in his first year. In the following years he contributed works to the Bunten exhibitions and travelled in Egypt, Italy, Spain, Germany and England.

In 1914, together with Yamashita Shintarō and Arishima Ikuma, he founded the Nikakai (二科会) or "Society for Progressive Japanese Artists". In 1918 he travelled to Korea and Manchuria. In 1921 he helped found the Bunka Gakuin. Two years later he travelled to France, Italy and England. In 1935 he withdrew from the Nikakai and joined the Imperial Fine Arts Academy. The following year, together with Yamashita Shintarō and Yasui Sōtarō, he founded the Issuikai (一水会). In 1937 he became a member of the reorganised Imperial Art Academy.

After the war, he contributed works to the Nitten exhibitions, going on to become chief judge of the yōga section. He also served in a special advisory capacity after the introduction of the 1950 Law for the Protection of Cultural Properties. In December 1958, shortly before his death, he was decorated with the Order of the Rising Sun.

== Select works ==
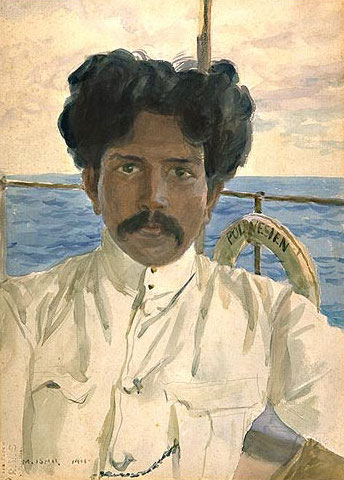
Upon the Indian Ocean (1910)

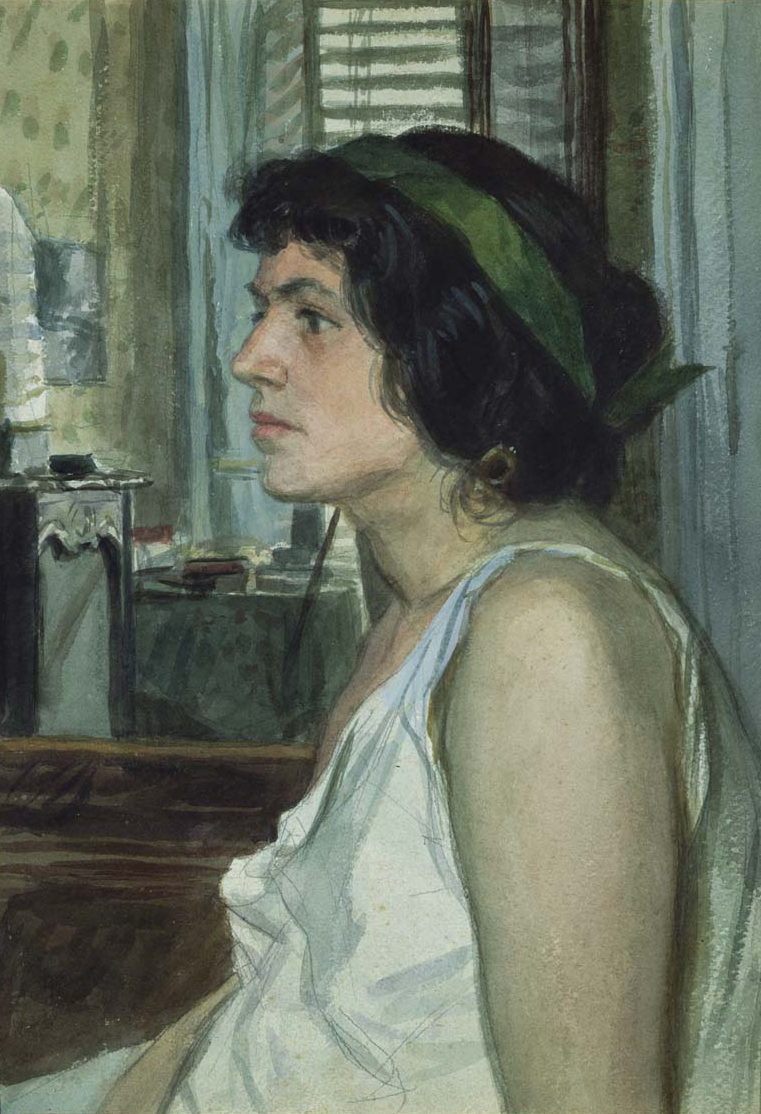
Paris Hotel (1911)

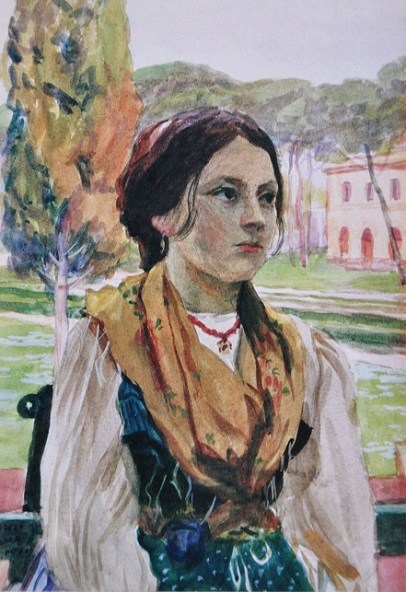
La Ciociara (1911)

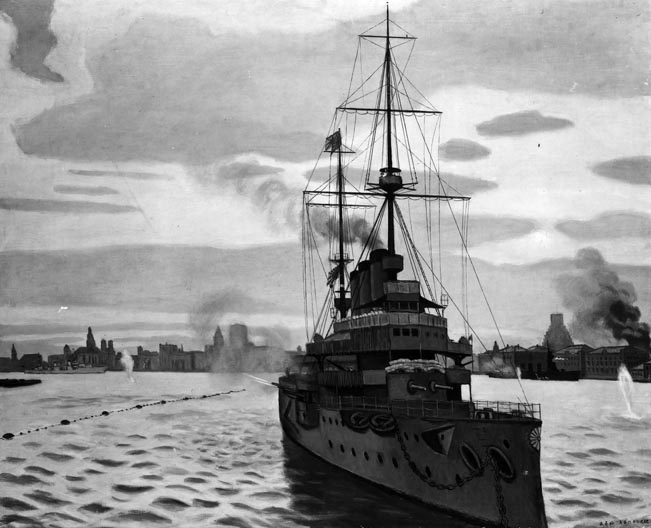
Izumo (1940)

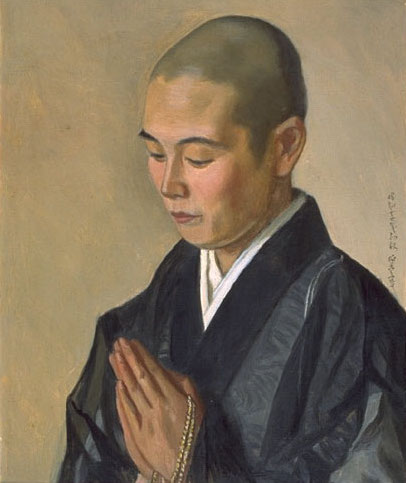
A Nun (1942)

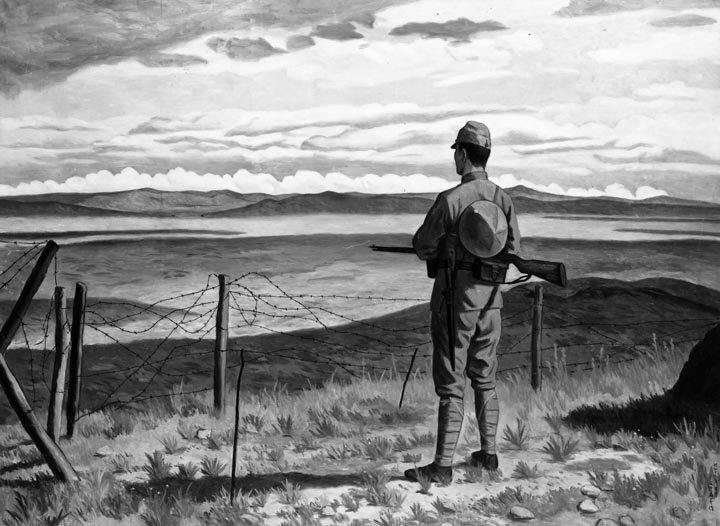
Patrol on the Russia-Manchuria Border (1944)

== See also ==
- List of Yōga painters
