= Ohara Museum of Art =

Museum in Japan

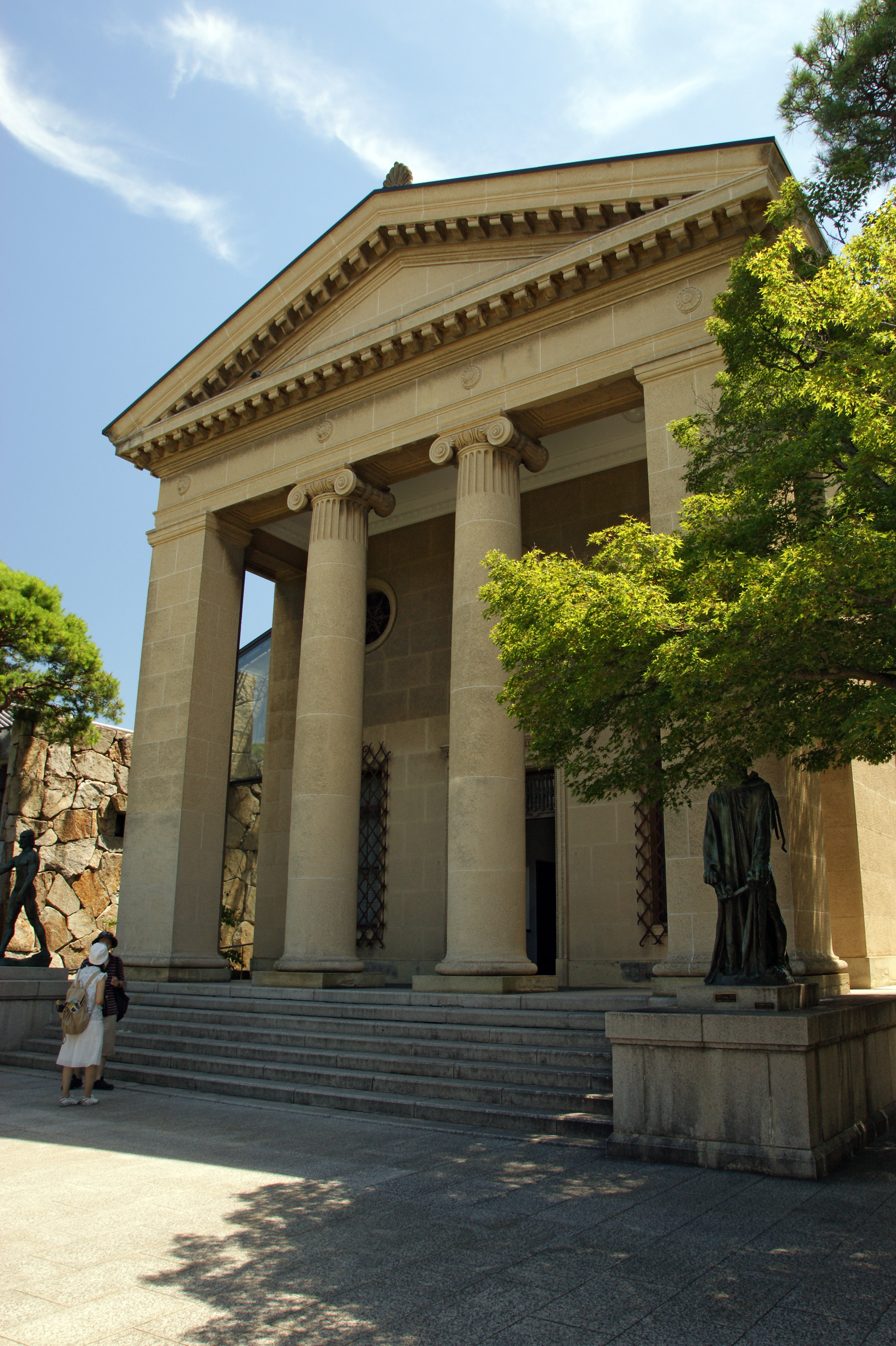
- Ōhara Art Museum
- Interactive fullscreen map
- Location: Kurashiki, Japan
- Coordinates: 34°35′46″N 133°46′14″E

The Ohara Museum of Art (大原美術館, Ōhara Bijutsukan) in Kurashiki was the first collection of Western art to be permanently exhibited in Japan. The museum opened in 1930 and originally consisted almost entirely of French paintings and sculptures of the 19th and 20th centuries. The collection has now expanded to include paintings of the Italian Renaissance and of the Dutch and Flemish 17th century. Well-known American and Italian artists of the 20th century are also included in the collection.

The basis of the collection was formed by Ōhara Magosaburō on the advice of the Japanese painter Kojima Torajirō (1881–1929) and the French artist Edmond Aman-Jean (1860–1935).

In 1961 a wing was added for acquired Japanese paintings of the first half of the 20th century: Fujishima Takeji, Aoki Shigeru, Kishida Ryūsei, Koide Tarushige and others. In the same year, a wing for potteries of Kawai Kanjirō, Bernard Leach, Hamada Shōji, Tomimoto Kenkichi and others was opened. 1963 a wing was added for the woodcuts of Munakata Shikō and dyeings of Keisuke Serizawa. Today the last two wings are combined as Crafts Wing (Kōgei-kan). 1972 the Kojima Torajirō Memorial Hall was opened at the Ivory Square of Kurashiki.

== Selected collection highlights ==
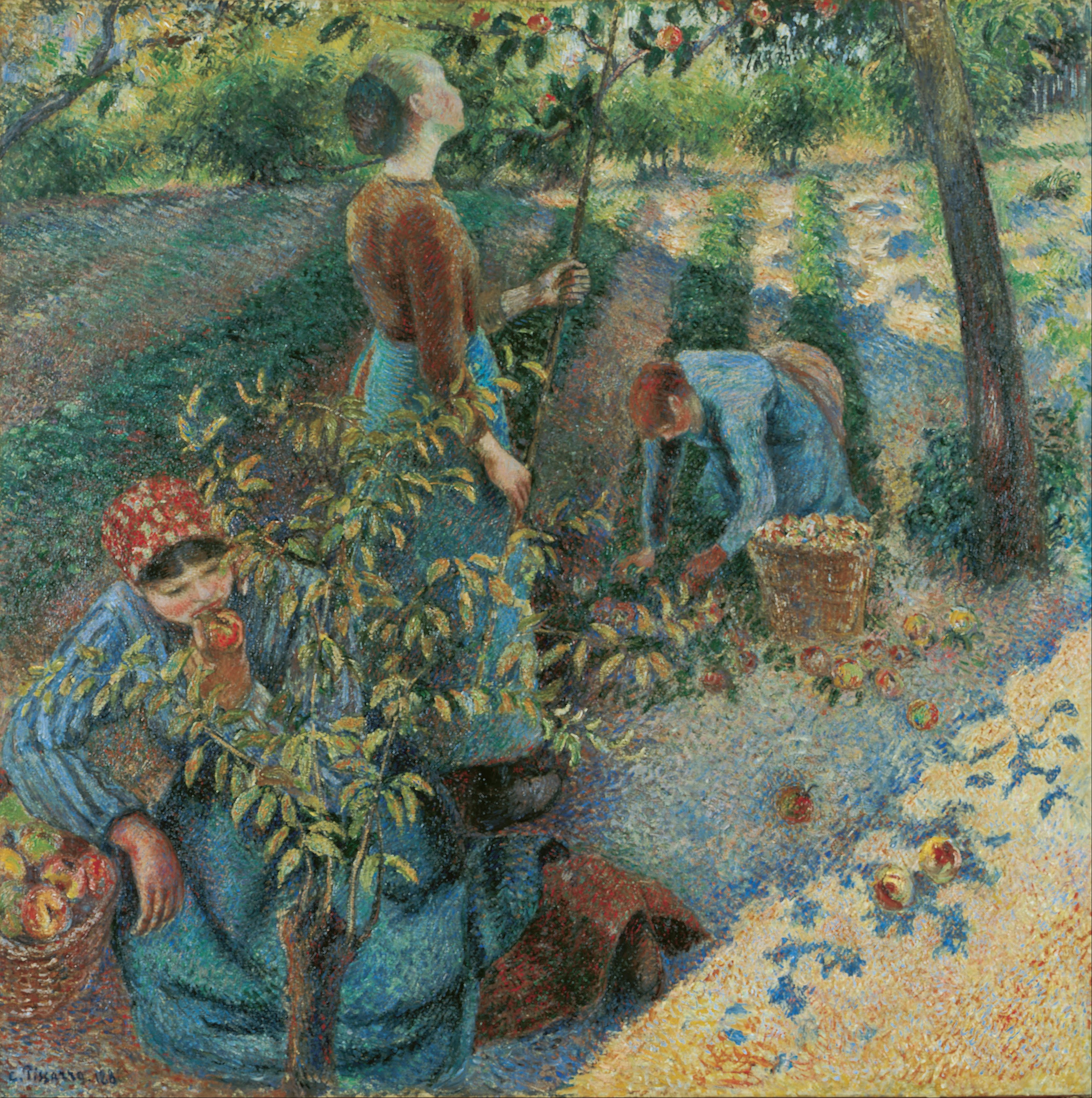
Camille Pissarro

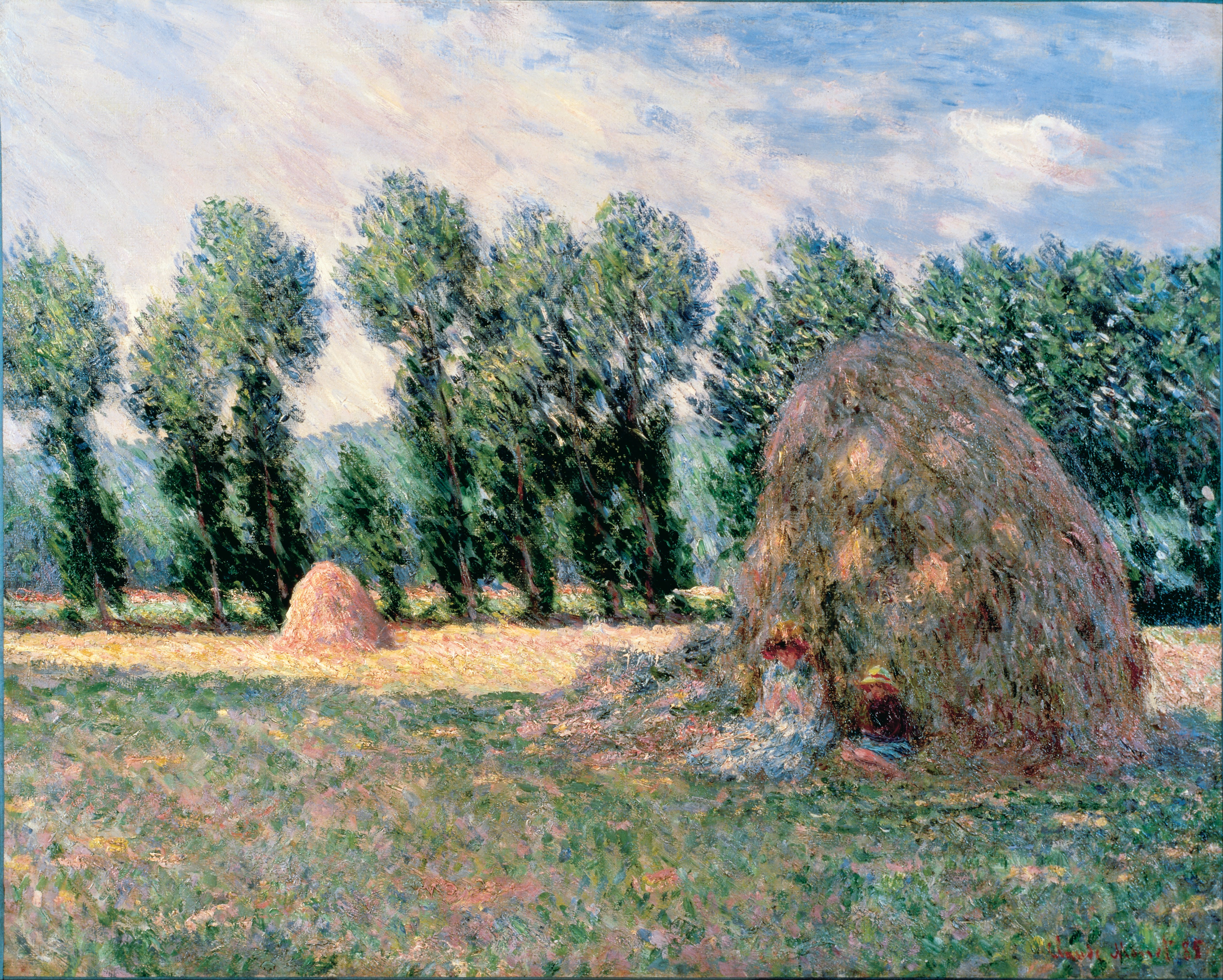
Claude Monet

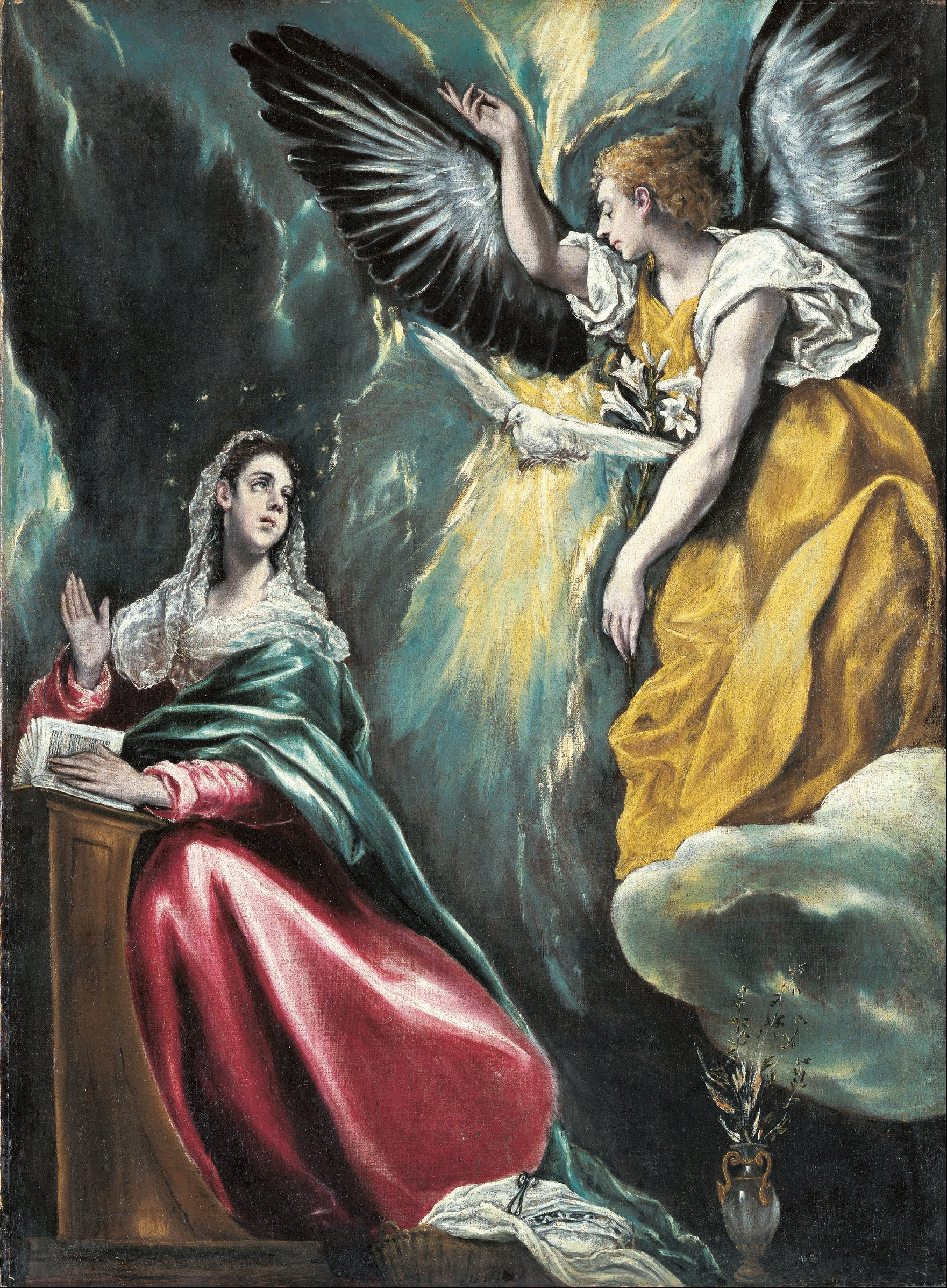
El Greco

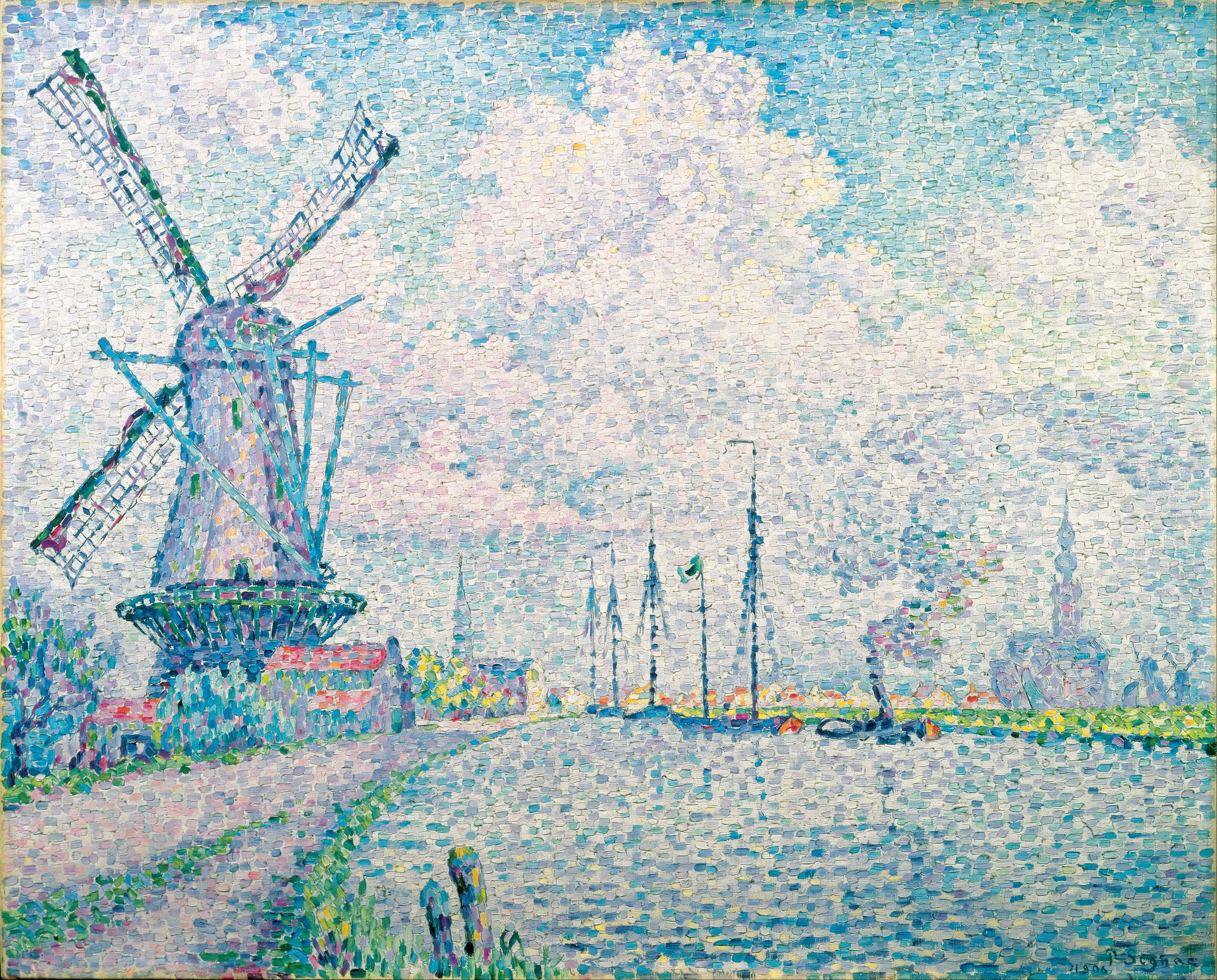
Paul Signac

== Selected artists ==
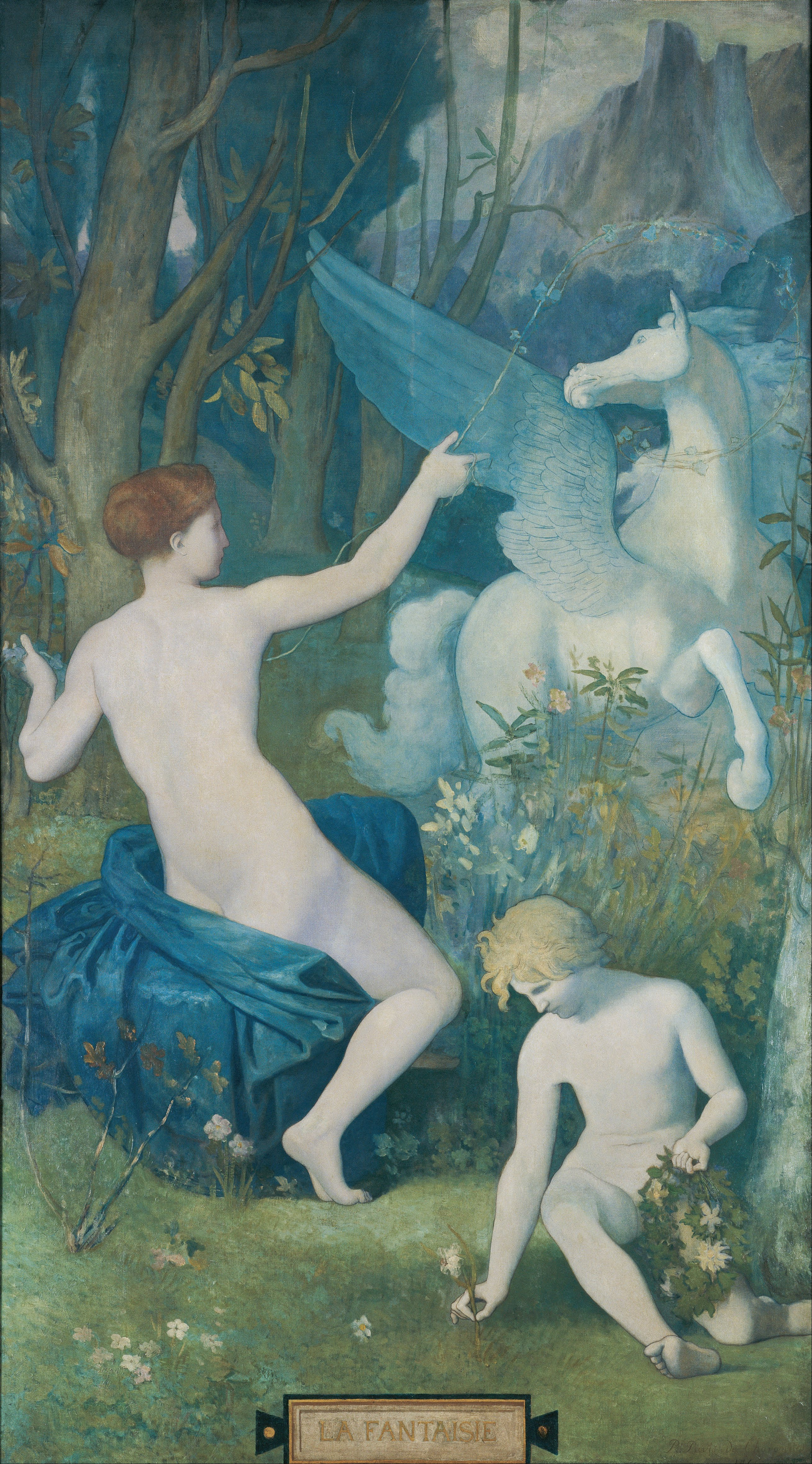
Pierre Puvis de Chavannes - Fantasy, Ohara Museum of Art

- El Greco (Annunciation)
- Pierre Puvis de Chavannes
- Camille Pissarro
- Edgar Degas
- Claude Monet (Water Lilies)
- Pierre-Auguste Renoir
- Paul Gauguin
- Giovanni Segantini
- Henri de Toulouse-Lautrec
- Amedeo Clemente Modigliani
- Pablo Picasso
- Jackson Pollock
- Maurice Utrillo
- Giorgio de Chirico
- Georges Rouault
- Pierre Soulages
- Henri Matisse
- Pierre Bonnard
- Jasper Johns
- Auguste Rodin
- Narashige Koide
- Yuzo Saeki
- Fujishima Takeji
- Ryuzaburo Umehara
- Sōtarō Yasui
- Shikō Munakata
- Tadanori Yokoo

== Access ==
- Public Transportation

Take Sanyo Shinkansen to Okayama Station. Change to Sanyo Line to Kurashiki Station. The museum is about 15-20 min walk.
