= List of Yōga painters =

This is an alphabetical list of painters who are known for painting in the Yōga style. Some artists also painted in the Japanese Nihonga style, and that the division between the two groups could be blurred at points.

Artists are listed by the native order of Japanese names, family name followed by given name, to ensure consistency even though some artists may be known outside Japan by their western-ordered name.

== Meiji era (1868–1912) ==
- Asai Chū (1856–1907)
- Fujishima Takeji (1867–1943)
- Harada Naojirō (1863–1899)
- Kawamura Kiyoo (1852–1934)
- Kenkichi Sugimoto (1905–2004)
- Kuroda Seiki (1866–1924)
- Soyama Sachihiko (1859–1892)
- Takahashi Yuichi (1828–1894)
- Wada Eisaku (1874–1959)
- Yamamoto Hōsui (1850–1906)

== Taishō era (1912–1926) ==
- Koyama Shōtarō (1857–1916)
- Kuwashige Giichi (1883–1943)
- Ryūsei Kishida (1891–1929)

== Shōwa era (1926–1989) ==
- Katsura Yuki (1913–1991)
- Kinoshita Takanori (1894–1973)
- Emi Kinuko (1923–2015)
- Ishii Hakutei (1882–1958)
- Migishi Setsuko (1905–1999)
- Sano Nui (1932–2023)
- Sugimoto Kenkichi (1905–2004)
- Umehara Ryūzaburō (1888–1986)
- Haruko Hasegawa (1895–1967)

== See also ==
- List of Nihonga painters
- List of Japanese artists
- List of Japanese painters
- Shunyo-kai art society, a yōga group
