= Jutaro Kuroda =

Japanese artist (1887–1970)

Jutaro Kuroda (黒田 重太郎, Kuroda Jūtarō) was a Japanese painter and prolific writer. He was born on June 20, 1887 in Ōtsu City, Shiga Prefecture and died on June 24, 1970 in Kyoto. He was an important figure within the Western-style painting circle of Kyoto and played a big role in bringing the acceptance of Western art into Japan.

From the years 1910-1912, Kuroda helped form two organizations, the Kuroneko-kai (Black Cat Society) and Kamen-kai (Mask Society). It consisted of a handful of young artists who painted in both Western style (yoga) and traditional Japanese style (nihonga). They were also following the Post-Impressionism trends of the time.

Kuroda had studied under two Japanese masters of Yōga art at his time, namely Kanokogi Takeshiro and Asai Chū He later went to Europe in 1916 and visited Matsukata Kojiro in London, which he assisted in the compilation of his collection. His earlier paintings also resembled the style of French painter Camille Pissarro. It was on his second journey that he became a pupil of the French Cubist artist André Lhote.

In his career as a writer, Kuroda made his own Japanese adaptation and released publication of Théodore Duret's biography on Van Gogh (1916) in Japan of 1921. Feng Zikai later readapted Kuroda's version into Chinese in 1929.

Kuroda was also a member of the Dokuritsu Art Association, which he once stated: 'When I first started to participate in exhibitions, the criticism that my colleagues and I dreaded the most was that our paintings “smelled Japanese”… It was obviously not a compliment … Yoga painters loathed any whiff of Japan in their own work. On the other hand, the greatest praise I could hope for was to have the critics say that our paintings looked “as if they had been painted by a Westerner”… [but] these days, none of us object to the Japanisation of Yoga.'

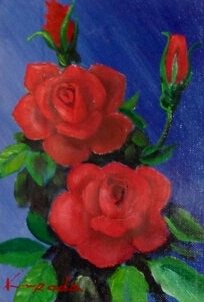
Bara ("Rose") (Private Collection, Japan)

== See also ==
- List of Yōga painters
