= Narashige Koide =

Japanese painter and illustrator (1887–1931)

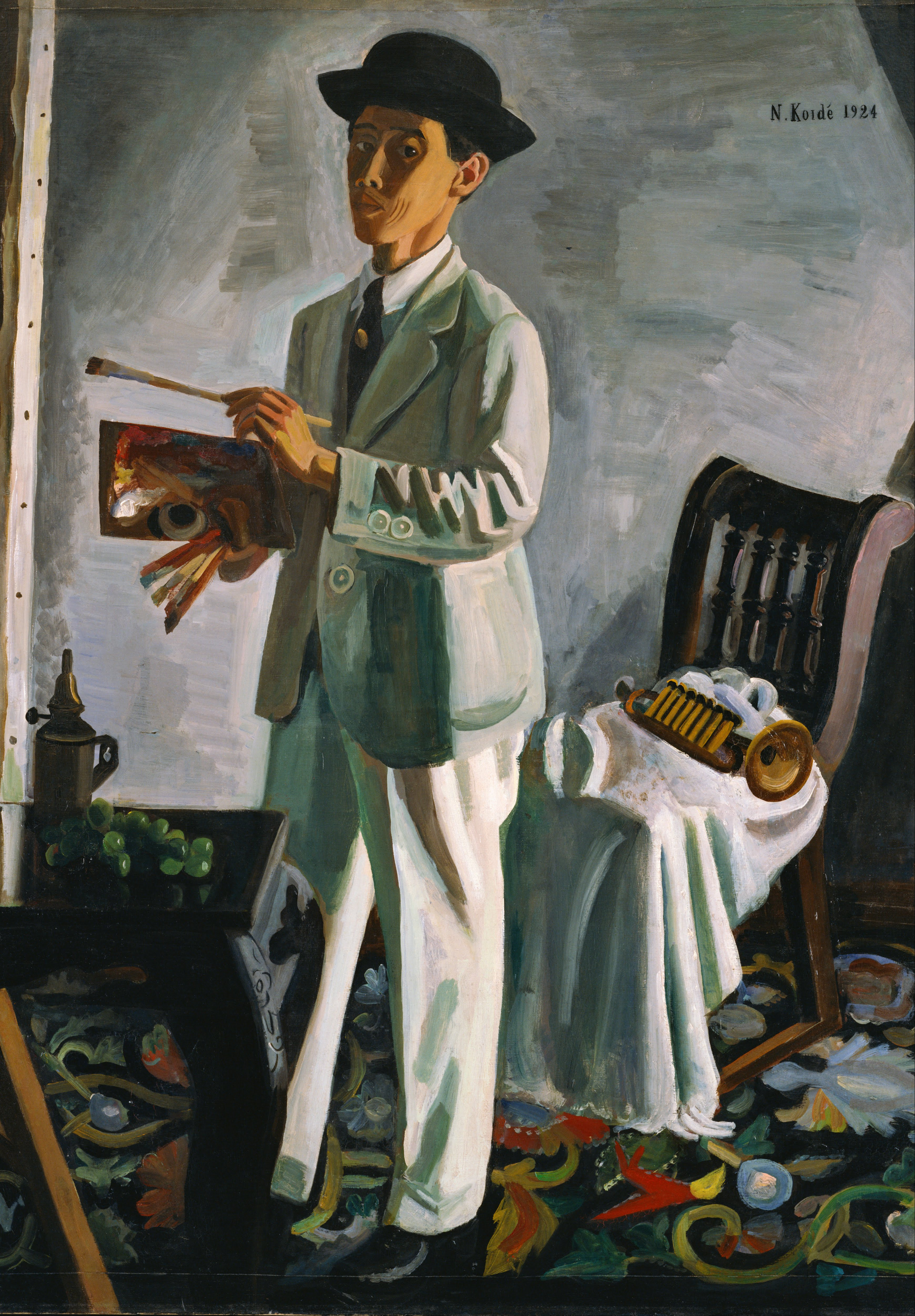
- Self Portrait
- Born: October 13, 1887; Osaka, Japan
- Died: February 13, 1931 (aged 43); Ashiya, Hyogo, Japan
- Known for: Painter
- Movement: Yōga

Narashige Koide (小出楢重, Koide Narashige; October 13, 1887 – February 13, 1931) was a Japanese painter and illustrator, noted for his work in pioneering the Hanshinkan Modernism trend in yōga (Western-style) portraiture and nude painting in early 20th century Japanese painting.

== Biography ==
Koide was born in what is now the Shinsaibashi area of Chūō-ku Osaka. Interested in art from childhood, he studied Nihonga in elementary and middle school. In 1907, he applied to the western arts department of Tokyo School of Fine Art, but failed his entrance examinations, and was accepted into the Nihonga department instead. Although he was able to study under famed Nihonga painter Shimomura Kanzan, he was still drawn to oil painting. After graduating in 1914 he returned to Osaka and continued to paint and entered a yōga-style portrait group titled "N-Family" into the 1919 6th Nikakai (Second Division Society) Exhibition, where he won the Chōgyū Prize. This painting is now recognized by the Agency of Cultural Affairs of the Japanese government as an Important Cultural Properties of Japan. In the Nikakai exhibition of 1920 his portrait of the "Young Girl Omme" received the Nika Prize. He received numerous commissions following these successes, and experimented with a variety of media, including painting on glass. From 1921–1922, he travelled to France, and established his atelier in Osaka in 1924. (This studio is now preserved at the Ashiya City Art Museum). In his later years, Koide was especially known for his nudes. He died in Ashiya, Hyōgo in 1931.

== Noted Works ==
- N’s Family (Nの家族, N no kazoku), 1919, Ohara Art Museum, National Important Cultural Property
- Boy with a Lamp (ラッパを持てる少年), 1923, National Museum of Modern Art, Tokyo, Japan
- Nude with white cloth (裸女と白布), 1929, National Museum of Modern Art, Tokyo, Japan
- Nude on a bed (寝台の裸婦), 1930, Ohara Museum of Art, Tokyo, Japan

N-Family
- Nの家族 (Japanese)
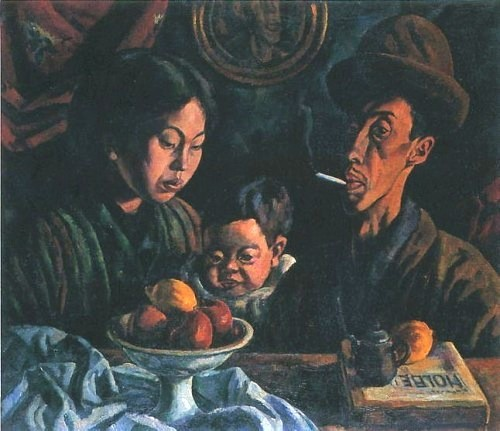
- Artist: Narashige Koide
- Year: 1919
- Type: Oil painting
- Dimensions: 78.0 cm × 90.5 cm (30.7 in × 35.6 in)
- Location: Ohara Art Museum, Kurashiki, Okayama
