= Arishima =

Arishima (written: 有島) is a Japanese surname. Notable people with the surname include:

- Ichirō Arishima (有島 一郎, 1916–1987), Japanese comedian and actor
- Ikuma Arishima (有島 生馬, 1882–1974), pen-name of Arishima Mibuma, Japanese writer and painter
- Takeo Arishima (有島 武郎, 1878–1923), Japanese writer
