= Takanori Kinoshita =

Japanese artist

Takanori Kinoshita (木下孝則, February 24, 1894 – March 29, 1973) was a Japanese artist known for paintings which combine Western subject matter with the aesthetic qualities of the Shōwa period.

== Early life and education ==
Kinoshita was born to a wealthy family in 1894. Toward the end of the Taishō period he was admitted to the Nikakai, or Second Section Association, a society of progressive Japanese artists. He associated with artists such as Zentaro Kojima, Katsuzo Satomi, and Yuzo Saeki.

During the 1920s he studied in Paris, at the École de Paris.

== Work ==
Takanori Kinoshita's work is considered to be Yōga, a style of painting produced by Japanese artists using traditional Western techniques and materials.

Kinoshita was schooled in Western conventions during his time in Paris though he eschewed the more avant-garde influences of the city in that era, such as Cubism, Surrealism, and Dadaism. He was vocal in his criticism of these movements. In 1923, he collaborated with the Russian artist David Burlick to co-author a book titled What Is Futurism? Answer which critiques Dada. He focused instead on absorbing late Impressionism. The works of Henri Matisse, Édouard Manet, Maurice de Vlaminck and Gustave Courbet were those that most inspired him.

After his return to Japan, Kinoshita was included in the Nikakai and Shunyokai exhibitions that promoted work in the European style. In his later development he incorporated elements of Surrealism and those of the Proletarian art movement.

Works from the 50s and 60s display an airy realist style and a preference for Western subjects such as still lifes and interior portraits.

Through the 1960s and 1970s Kinoshita created a series of nudes.

== Career ==
By 1930 Kinoshita was well known in Japan. He co-founded the "1930 Association" along with Hiroshi Maeda, Yuzo Sa, Zentaro Kojima and Shozo Satomi, which sought to propagate the European individualism celebrated by the École de Paris.

In 1961 and 1962 a series of Kinoshita's paintings were used as covers for Shukan Asahi.

== Collections ==
Takanori Kinoshita's work is held in permanent collections including those of the Hiroshima Museum of Art and the National Museum of Modern Art, Tokyo.
