= Tazawa =

Tazawa (written: 田澤 or 田沢) is a Japanese surname. Notable people with the surname include:

- Tazawa Inabune (田澤 稲舟, 1874–1896), Japanese writer
- Junichi Tazawa (田澤 純一, born 1986), Japanese baseball player
- Kichirō Tazawa (田沢 吉郎, 1918–2001), Japanese politician
- Masumi Tazawa (田澤 茉純), Japanese voice actress
- Shuji Tazawa (田澤 修治, born 1968), Japanese sport shooter
- Yuki Tazawa (田澤 勇気, born 1979), Japanese footballer

== See also ==
- Tazawa Station, a railway station in Azumino, Nagano Prefecture, Japan
- Lake Tazawa, a lake in Semboku, Akita Prefecture, Japan
