= Yoshie Nakada =

Japanese painter

- Born: 15 January 1902; Osaka, Japan
- Died: 11 April 1995 (aged 93); Mitaka, Japan
- Occupation: Painter

Yoshie Nakada (仲田好江) (15 January 1902 – 11 April 1995) was a Japanese painter.

Nakada was born in Osaka, Japan on January 15, 1902. She graduated from high school in 1920. In 1927 she moved to Tokyo and studied under Sōtarō Yasui. She married art critic and sculptor Sadanosuke Nakada in the same year.

Her work was part of the painting event in the art competition at the 1932 Summer Olympics. Her works are held by the National Museum of Modern Art, Tokyo and the Nirasaki Omura Art Museum.

Nakada died of a heart attack on April 11, 1995 in Mitaka, Japan.
