= Haruko Hasegawa =

Japanese painter (1895–1967)

- 長谷川春子
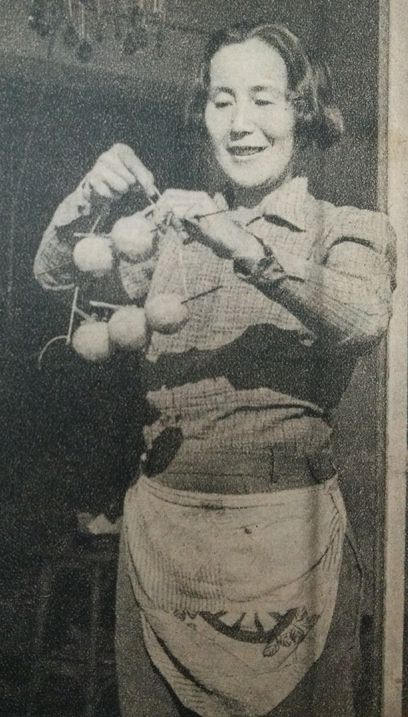
- Born: February 28, 1895; Tokyo, Japan
- Died: May 7, 1967 (aged 72); Tokyo, Japan
- Other names: Hasegawa Haruko
- Occupations: Painter, illustrator, writer
- Years active: 1929–1967
- Relatives: Shigure Hasegawa (sister)

Haruko Hasegawa (Japanese: 長谷川春子; 1895 – 1967) was a Japanese painter, illustrator, and writer. She was known for Yōga (Western-style Japanese painting) war painting, and was a member of the Kokugakai arts organization. Hasegawa visited war zones in the 1930s and 1940s, to highlight Japanese armed forces and patriotism in both her illustrations and writings.

== Early life and education ==
Haruko Hasegawa was born on February 28, 1895, in Tokyo. Her mother came from a hatamoto family, while her father practiced law, and he was one of the first in Japan to do so in a modern manner. Her older sister was Shigure Hasegawa. She graduated from the Futaba Junior and Senior High School.

Hasegawa was student of Kiyokata Kaburagi (1878–1972), a master of the ukiyo-e school.

== Career ==
Her artwork was first exhibited in 1928 in Tokyo. She worked as an illustrator for Nyonin Geijutsu (1928–1932), the Japanese women's literary journal founded by her older sister.

Hasegawa travelled to France in 1929, and held solo exhibitions at Zac Gallery in Paris that year and the following year. When she returned to Japan in 1931, she exhibited her artwork at the Kokugakai exhibition at the Tokyo Metropolitan Art Museum, and became a member of the arts organization in 1932.

During the Manchurian Incident and the Second Sino-Japanese War, she served on the front lines as a correspondent. In 1939, Hasegawa was the only female founding member of the "Army Art Association" (Japanese: 陸軍芸術協会, romanized: Rikugun Bijitsu Kyōkai). In February 1943, Hasegawa was among the founding members of the "Women Artists Service Corp." (Japanese: 女流美術家奉公隊, romanized: Jōryū Bijutsuka Hōkōtai), a paramilitary organization sponsored by the Imperial Japanese Army to engage women in patriotic activities. When World War II ended, Hasegawa was ostracized in Japanese painting circles as a result of her work during the war.

A few years before her death, she illustrated The Tale of Genji. She died on May 7, 1967, in Ota Ward, Tokyo.

== Exhibitions ==
- 1929, Zac Gallery, Paris, France
- 1930, Zac Gallery, Paris, France
- 1931, 6th Kokugakai Exhibition, Tokyo Metropolitan Art Museum, Tokyo, Japan
- 1932, 7th Kokugakai Exhibition, Tokyo Metropolitan Art Museum, Tokyo, Japan
- 1933, 8th Kokugakai Exhibition, Tokyo Metropolitan Art Museum, Tokyo, Japan
- 1936, 9th Kokugakai Exhibition, Tokyo Metropolitan Art Museum, Tokyo, Japan
- 1939, 11th Kokugakai Exhibition, Tokyo Metropolitan Art Museum, Tokyo, Japan
- 1940, 12th Kokugakai Exhibition, Tokyo Metropolitan Art Museum, Tokyo, Japan
- 1941, 13th Kokugakai Exhibition, Tokyo Metropolitan Art Museum, Tokyo, Japan
- 1942, 14th Kokugakai Exhibition, Tokyo Metropolitan Art Museum, Tokyo, Japan
- 1943, 15th Kokugakai Exhibition, Tokyo Metropolitan Art Museum, Tokyo, Japan
- 1944, 16th Kokugakai Exhibition, Tokyo Metropolitan Art Museum, Tokyo, Japan
- 1952, 17th Kokugakai Exhibition, Tokyo Metropolitan Art Museum, Tokyo, Japan

== See also ==
- List of Yōga painters
