= Prime Minister Tanaka =

Prime Minister Tanaka (田中総理) may refer to one of the following Prime Ministers of Japan:

- Tanaka Giichi (1864–1929), Japanese general and politician
- Kakuei Tanaka (1918–1993), Japanese politician

== See also ==
- Tanaka (disambiguation)
- Giichi
