= Yuzo Saeki =

Japanese painter (1898–1928)

Saeki Yūzō
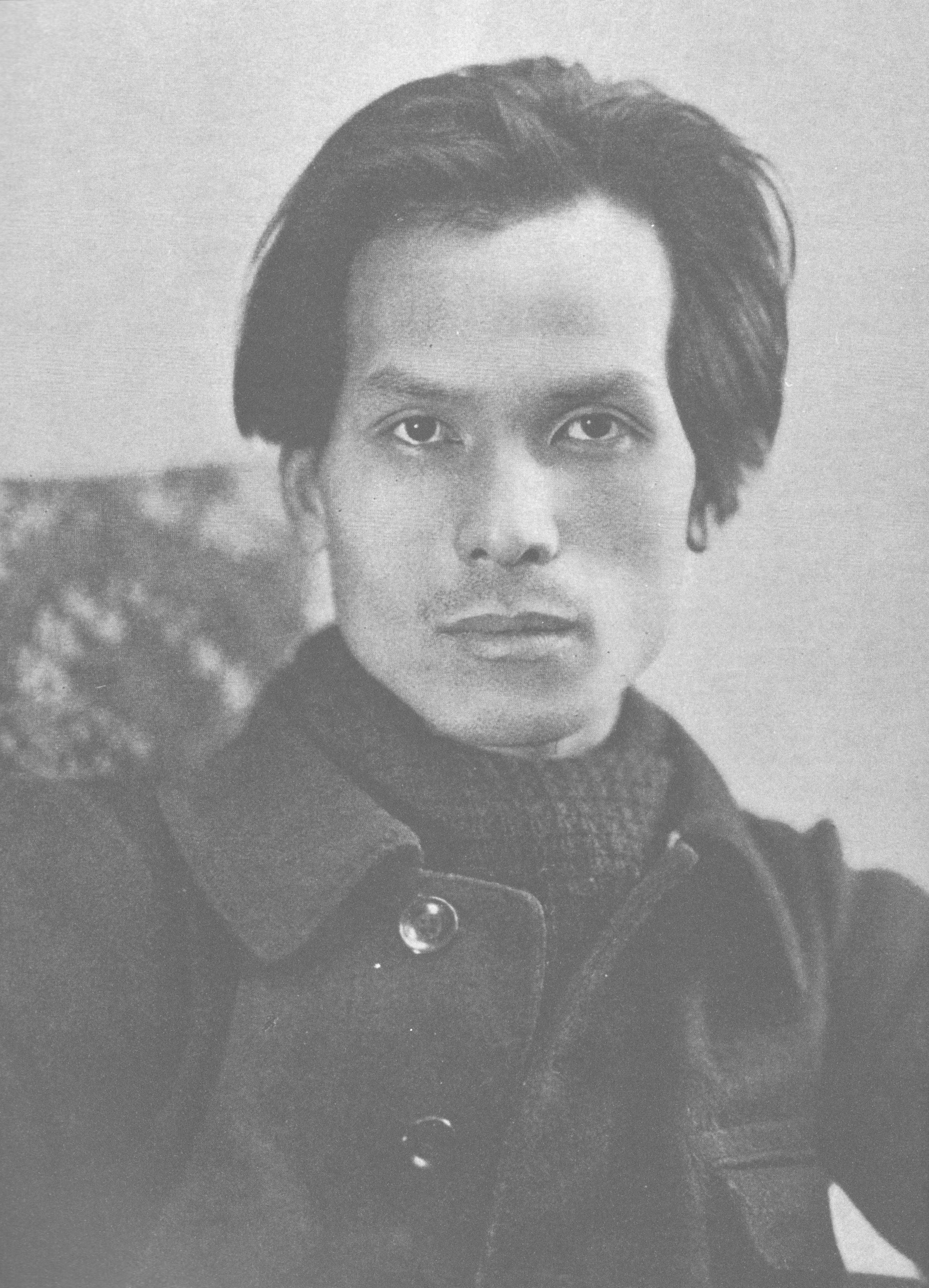
- Saeki Yūzō
- Born: 28 April 1898; Osaka, Japan
- Died: 16 August 1928 (aged 30); Paris, France
- Known for: Painting
- Movement: Yōga

Yūzō Saeki (佐伯 祐三, Saeki Yūzō; 28 April 1898 – 16 August 1928) was a Japanese painter, noted for his work in developing modernism and Fauvist Expressionism within the yōga (Western-style) art movement in early twentieth-century Japanese painting.

== Biography ==
Saeki was born in Osaka as the son of a Buddhist priest. He was interested in art from an early age, and imitated the Impressionist style Kuroda Seiki while learning art in middle school. He moved to Koishikawa (now part of Bunkyō in Tokyo) in 1917 to study art under Takeji Fujishima and enrolled in the western art department of the Tokyo School of Fine Arts in 1918. He married fellow painter Yoneko Ikeda in 1921.

In summer 1924, Saeki moved to France with his wife and daughter. He attended the Académie de la Grande Chaumière in Paris, where fellow Japanese painter Katsuzo Satomi introduced him to the Fauvist painter, anarchist and journalist Maurice de Vlaminck, who was strongly critical of his work, and whose comments influenced his later technique. Saeki favored portraiture and landscape paintings of Parisian city scenes, especially the backstreets, bars and buildings in the style of Maurice Utrillo or Vincent van Gogh. In 1925, two of his works were accepted by the Salon d'Automne.

Saeki returned to Japan in 1926 at the urging of his family and formed an artists' society called "1930-nen Kyokai" (Society of the Year 1930) together with Satomi and other artists returning from France. The same year, he also won the Nika prize at the 13th Nikaten, an exhibition held by The Second Society in opposition to the more conservative, government- sponsored Bunten exhibition. However, Saeki could not find inspiration in the suburbs of Tokyo, and in August 1927, traveling via the Trans-Siberian Railway, he returned to France.

Despite his worsening health, he frequently painted outdoors in inclement weather. His frenetic efforts at depicting the streets of Paris led to a deterioration in the tuberculosis he had long suffered from. By March 1928, he was largely bedridden. He also had a nervous breakdown, and died destitute in a mental hospital in the Paris suburbs.

== Displays ==
- An overview of Saeki's life, along with copies of his works, are on display at the recently renovated Yuzo Saeki Atelier Memorial Hall, on the outskirts of Shinjuku-ku (district) in Tokyo.

== Selected paintings ==
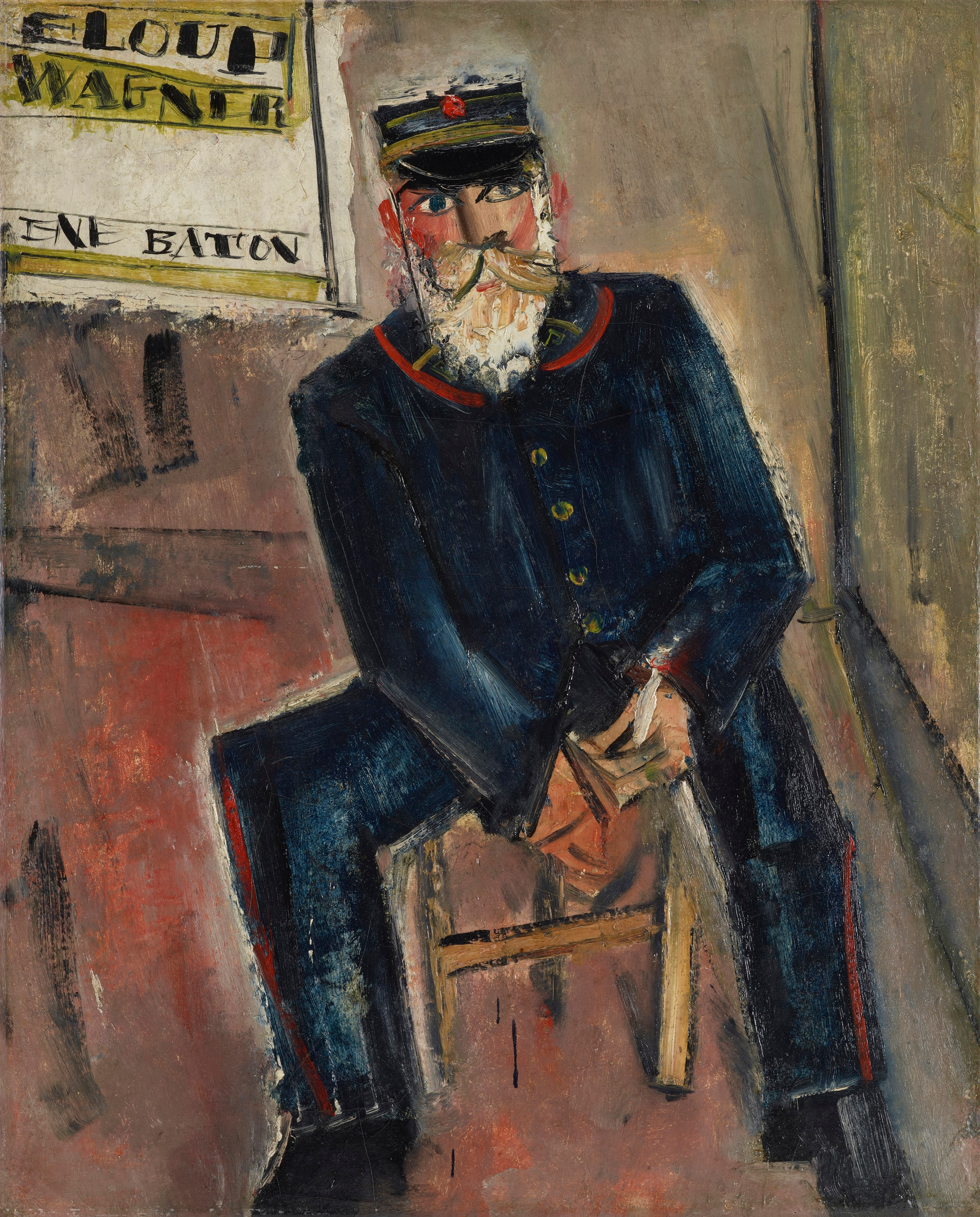
Postman

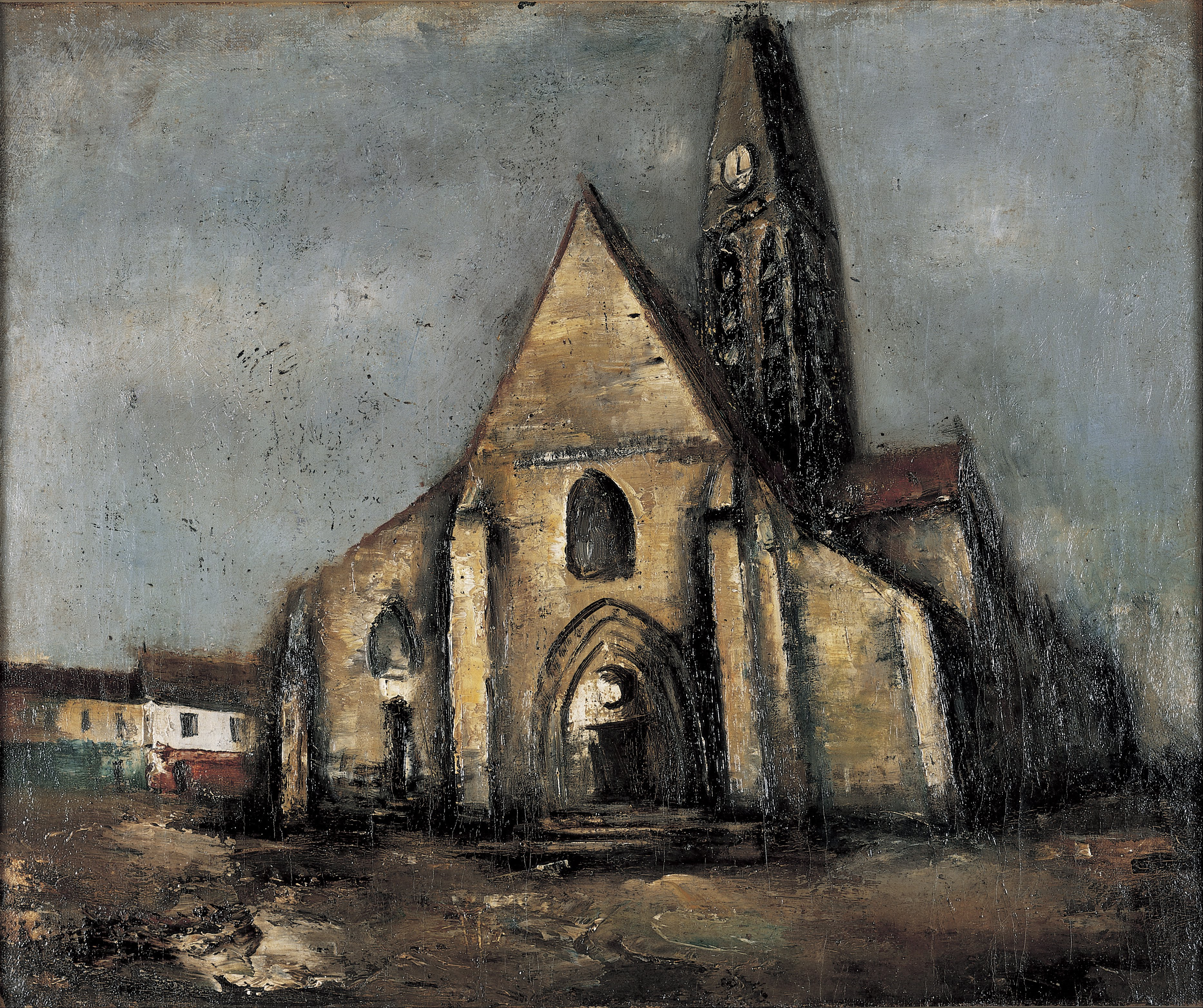
Church in Paris

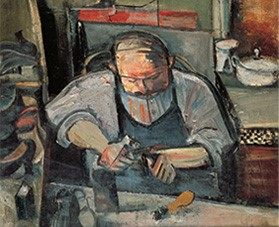
Shoemaker

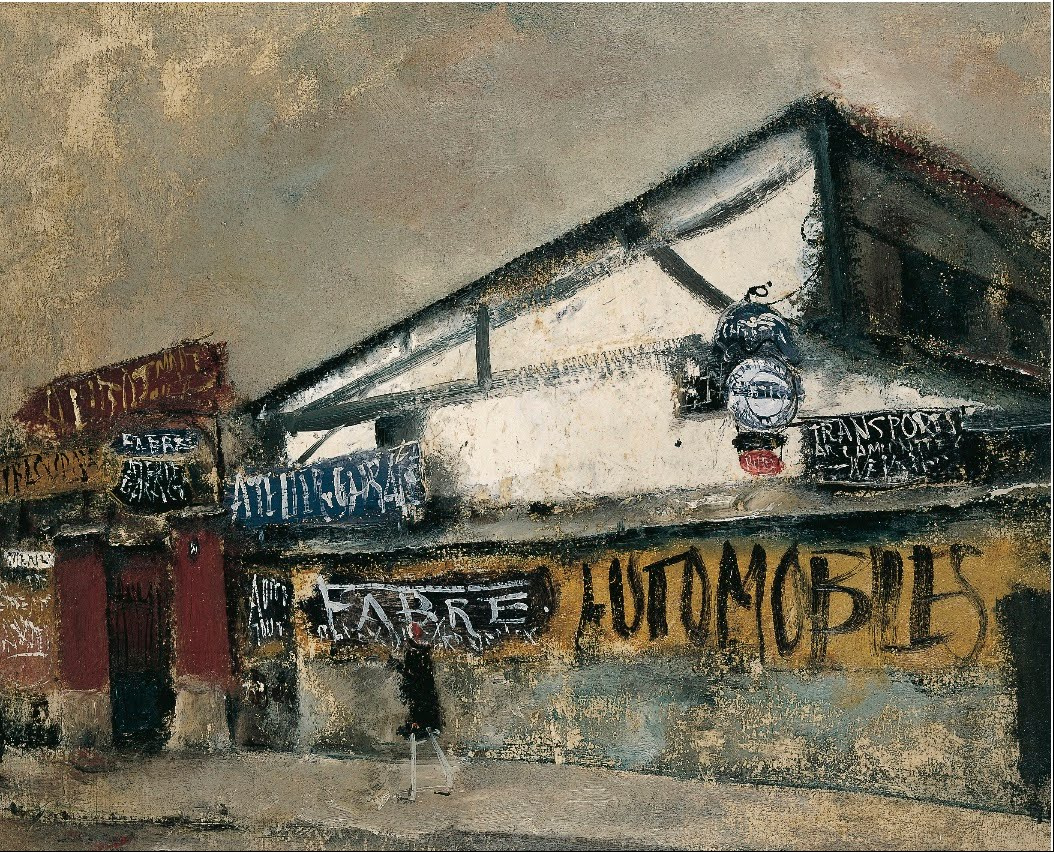
Garage

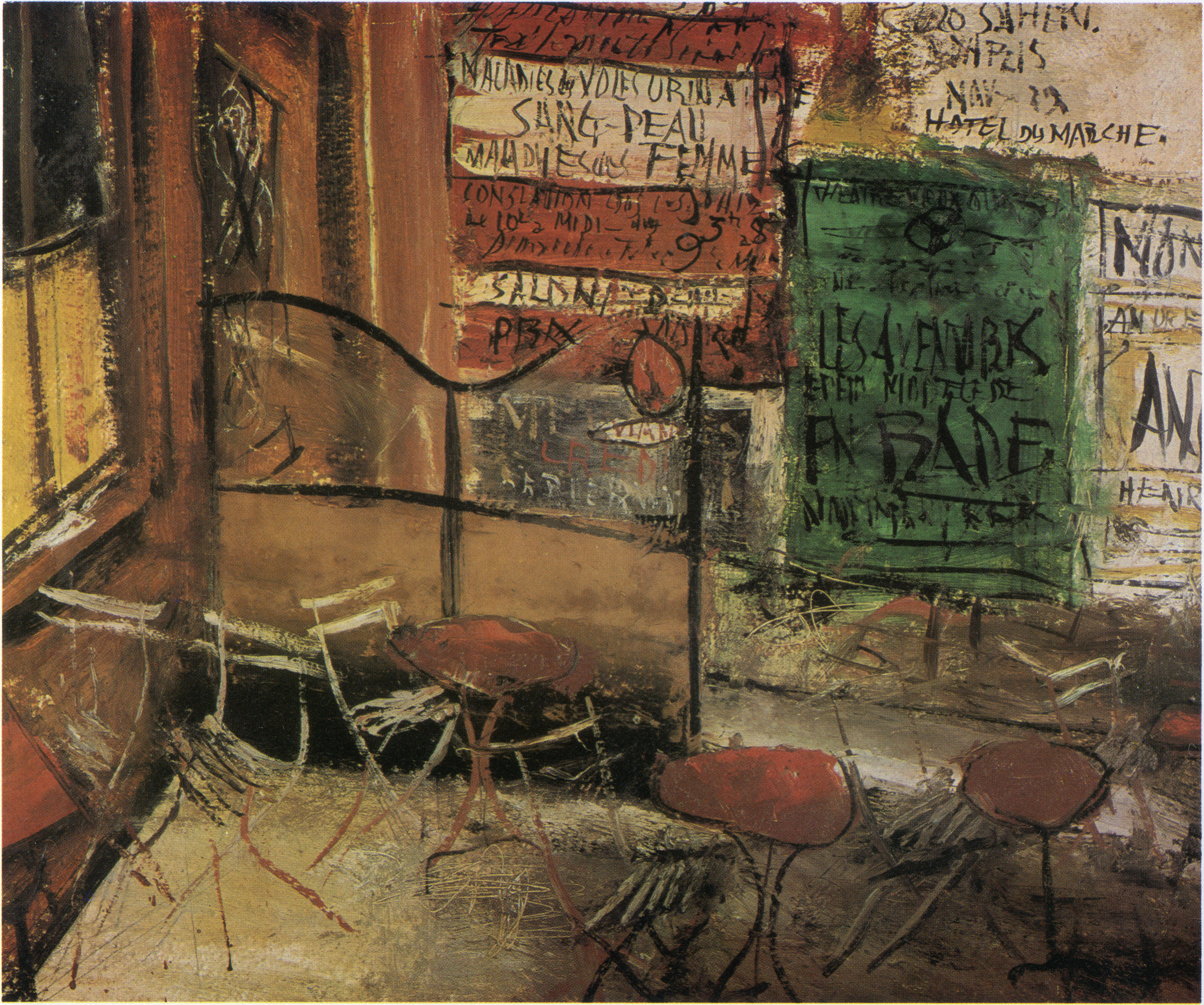
Cafe Terrace

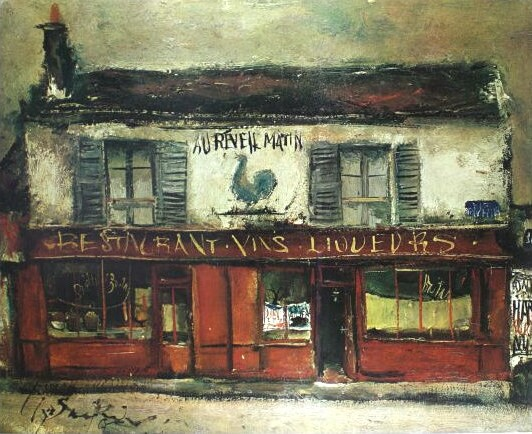
Restaurant (Au Réveil Matin)
