= Giichi =

- Gender: Male

Origin
- Origin: Japanese
- Meaning: Different meanings depending on the kanji used

Giichi (written 儀一 or 義一), is a masculine Japanese given name. Notable people with the name include:

- Giichi Arima (有馬 義一; 1911–1993), Japanese baseball player
- Giichi Nishihara (西原 儀一; born 1929), Japanese film director, screenwriter, producer and actor
- Giichi Nomura (野村 義一; 1914–2008), Japanese human rights activist
- Tanaka Giichi (田中 義一; 1864–1929), Imperial Japanese Army general, politician and Prime Minister of Japan
- Kuwashige Giichi (桑重 儀一; 1883–1943), Japanese yōga painter
