= Yamada Bimyō =

Japanese writer (1868–1910)

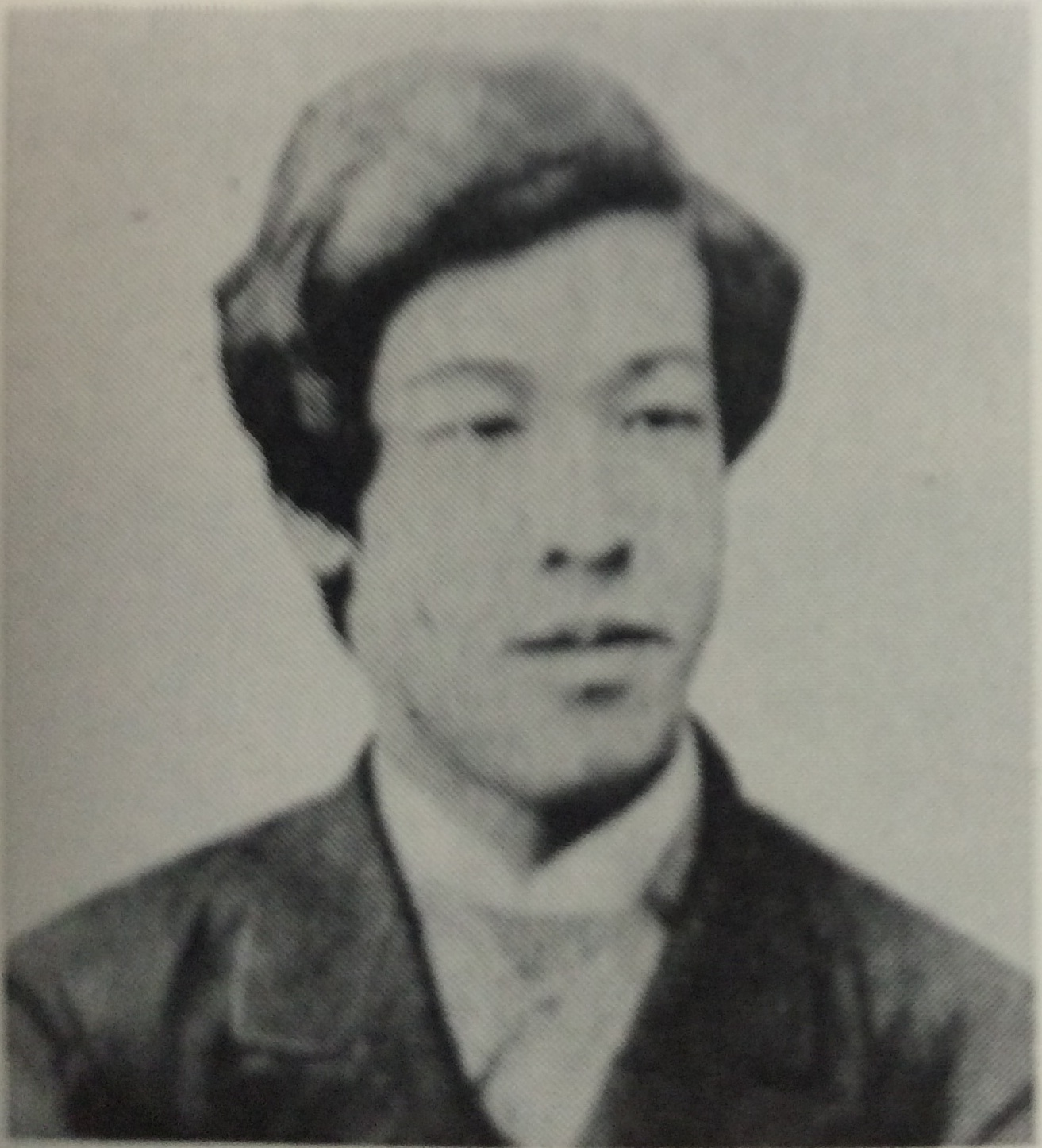
Yamada Bimyō

Yamada Bimyō (山田 美妙), born Yamada Taketarō (山田 武太郎; 1868–1910), was a Japanese novelist.

Jim Reichert, author of Yamada Bimyō: Historical Fiction and Modern Love, wrote that Bimyō was "one of the most influential literary reformers of the 1880s" who had "an instrumental role" in producing rekishi shōsetsu, the modern form of a Japanese historical novel. According to Reichert, during the 1880s the public perceived Bimyō "to be at the forefront of the literary reform movement, offering a fresh and exciting strategy for reforming Japanese literature."

Louis Frédéric, author of the Japan Encyclopedia, wrote that Bimyō was, along with Kōda Rohan, "the most representative authors" of the first modern school of literature to appear in Meiji Japan.

== History ==
Bimyō was a part of the "Ken'yūsha" ("Friends of the Inkstone") Meiji literary group formed in February 1885, along with Ozaki Kōyō, Ishibashi Shian, and Maruoka Kyūka.

Bimyō married the writer Tazawa Inabune (Tazawa Kin) after she traveled to Tokyo to meet him. At the time, Bimyō's financial situation was deteriorating, and Inabune's family was wealthy. Yukiko Tanaka, author of Women Writers of Meiji and Taisho Japan: Their Lives, Works and Critical Reception, 1868-1926, stated that the marriage would not have occurred if his financial troubles did not exist.

During the marriage Bimyō had affairs with other women. Bimyō told Ozaki Kōyō, who criticized his affairs, that the dalliances were to enhance his artistic abilities. The marriage attracted scrutiny from the press, and after three months Bimyō and Inabune divorced, and Inabune was forced to return home.

The man's relationships with his colleagues eventually deteriorated. Bimyō's ex-wife died in 1896, and many newspapers erroneously reported that she had committed suicide. Melek Ortabasi, author of "Tazawa Inabune (1874-1896)", wrote that Inabune's death ended Bimyō's career "in large part" because Bimyō received criticism for how he had treated Inabune.

Bimyō died at age 42. At the time of his death he was in a poor economic situation. In 2006 Reichert stated that Bimyō had "faded into relative obscurity".

== Writing style ==
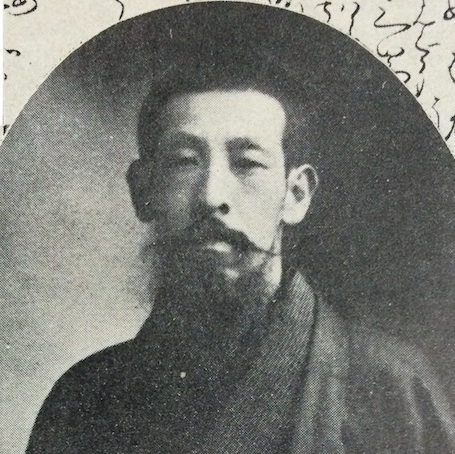
Yamada Bimyō in 1910

Tomi Suzuki, author of Narrating the Self: Fictions of Japanese Modernity, wrote that Bimyō's writing style "was in fact far from the spoken languages of the time." Bimyō favored genbun-itchi (言文一致), which means unifying spoken and written language, and also used Western literature features including different grammatical persons, ellipses, passive voice, personification, and Western tense styles. He wrote an 1889 article advocating genbun-itchi.

== Works ==
- Shōnen Sugata ("On the Beauty of Youths", 1885-1886) - A collection of poems
- "Musashino" (武蔵野 "Plain of Musashi", 1887) - First printed in the November and December issues of the Yomiuri Shimbun.
- Kochō ("Butterfly", 1889)
- "Outline of genbun-itchi theory" ("Genbun-itchi ron gairyaku", 1889)
  - The author compared and contrasted genbun-itchi and futsūbun, or the standard written language.
- Josō no tantei (女装の探偵, 1902)
- Chi no namida (地の涙, 1903)
- Shōsetsu hane neke tori (小説・羽ぬけ鳥, 1903)
- Sabigatana (さびがたな, 1903)
- "Bakin no bunsho ryakuhyo" (Brief comments on Bakin's writing)

== Collections ==
- Natsukodachi - "Musashino" is within this collection
