= Hasegawa Shigure =

Japanese playwright and magazine editor

- 長谷川 時雨
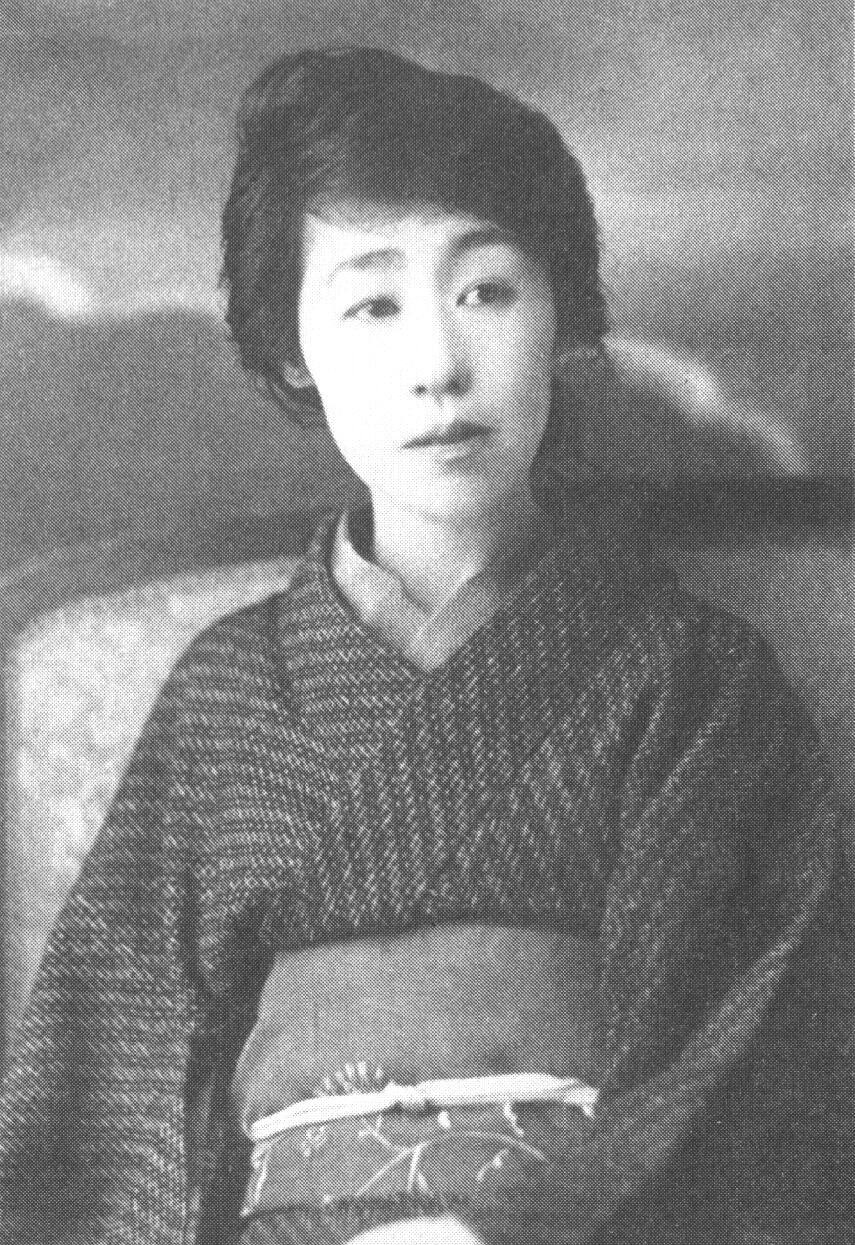
- Born: Hasegawa Yasu (長谷川 ヤス); October 1, 1879; Tokyo, Empire of Japan
- Died: August 22, 1941 (aged 61); Tokyo, Empire of Japan
- Occupations: Playwright, novelist
- Relatives: Haruko Hasegawa (sister)
- Writing career
- Years active: 1901–1941
- Notable works: Ejima Ikushima; Old Tales of Nihonbashi

Japanese name
- Kanji: 長谷川時雨
- Hiragana: はせがわ しぐれ

Hasegawa Shigure (長谷川 時雨; 1879–1941) was a Japanese playwright and editor of a literary journal. Hasegawa was the only woman to be featured in three volumes of the Meiji bungaku zenshū ("Collected works of Meiji literature"), a collection published by Chikuma Shobō, and she had the title joryū bundan no ōgosho ("great writer of the woman’s literary community’"); Barbara Hartley, author of "The space of childhood memories: Hasegawa Shigure and Old Nihonbashi," cited these facts when describing Hasegawa as "a major literary figure" of the era prior to World War II.

Hartley wrote that "Shigure’s work has been largely overlooked in English-language scholarship" and that this may have been due to a perception that she supported militaristic elements that existed in Japan before World War II.

Her family members; second husband, Mikami Otokichi (三上 於菟吉); and good friends, including Onoe Kikugorō VI (六代目 尾上 菊五郎); all called her O-Yatchan.

== Early life ==
She was born as Hasegawa Yasu (長谷川 ヤス) in Tōriabura-chō in Nihonbashi; Tōriabura-chō is currently a part of Ōdenma-chō. Her parents were merchants; her mother came from a hatamoto family, while her father practiced law and was one of the first to do so in a modern manner in Japan. She was the oldest child and had two brothers and four sisters, including Haruko Hasegawa. Her work Old Tale Nihonbashi documents her childhood. She received exposure to literature through a live-in apprentice even though her mother opposed education for girls.

For a period Hasegawa worked in the service of a nobleperson. Her father forced her to marry at age 19. Hartley wrote that the forcing of the marriage was a "bitter" and that it "further heightened Shigure’s sense of the social injustices visited upon women." Her first husband was the second son of a businessman who owned a mining company.

She began writing around the time of her first marriage. Hartley stated that Hasegawa became the era's first "acknowledged" female kabuki playwright in 1905. In 1914 she began caring for the son of one of her brothers, Toratarō; the boy's name was Hitoshi. In 1915 Hasegawa began providing financial support for her family after the failure of her mother's businesses and the decline of her father's reputation due to having an involvement in a business scandal described by Hartley as "peripheral". In 1916 she met Mikami Otokichi (三上 於菟吉), who became her second husband. He wrote serial fiction. Hasegawa's father died in 1918. In 1919 she and Mikami began living together as part of a common law marriage.

In 1923 Hasegawa and Okada Yachiyo (岡田 八千代) began efforts to establish a literary magazine which was launched in 1928. The journal was named Nyonin geijutsu ("Women and the Arts"). The funds came from Mikami's royalties; he had suggested buying Hasegawa a diamond ring but she asked instead to give her 20,000 yen so she could establish the magazine. Hartley wrote that Hasegawa was the "principal moving force" behind this journal.

== Writing style ==
Hasegawa's plays were written for kabuki stages. Rebecca L. Copeland, editor of Woman Critiqued: Translated Essays on Japanese Women's Writing, stated that these plays "resisted clichéd tragic endings and featured heroines who strove for self-fulfillment and independence."

M. Cody Poulton, the author of A Beggar's Art: Scripting Modernity in Japanese Drama, 1900-1930, wrote that Tamotsu Watanabe (渡辺 保 Watanabe Tamotsu), a critic of kabuki works, had "expressed his shock at how dark Shigure's modern plays were".

== Works ==
Plays:

- Chōji midare ("Wavering traces", 1911) - Translated into English in 1996
- One Afternoon (1912)
- The Dog (1923)
- Tegona (1941) - It is a lyrical one act play. In the play, based on a legend, a woman encounters two men who wish to marry her, but she chooses to kill herself. According to Poulton, it "is more typical of Shigure's kabuki plays." Mori Ōgai's The Ikuta River (生田川 Ikutagawa) is derived from the same legend that this play is derived from.
- Rain of Ice - the story of the final hours of a dying woman.

Other works:

- Old Tale Nihonbashi
- Hasegawa Shigure wrote a fictionalized biography of Tazawa Inabune as part of Shuntaiki - Meiji Taishō josei shō ("A springtime account - Portraits of women of Meiji and Taishō"), a seven-part series that was serialized in Tokyo Asahi. Melek Ortabasi, author of "Tazawa Inabune (1874-1896)", wrote that compared to the Yomiuri Shimbun series about Inabune, this was "more sympathetic".

Collections:

- Hasegawa, Shigure. Hasegawa Shigure zenshū. In five volumes. Tokyo: Fuji shuppan, 1993.
