= Kuwashige Giichi =

Kuwashige Giichi (桑重儀一 ; 1883－1943) was a Japanese yōga painter.

== Biography ==
He studied in France and taught morning class at the Taiheiyōgakai Institute. He became a member of the Ohira Western-style painting association.
