= Tazawa Inabune =

Japanese writer

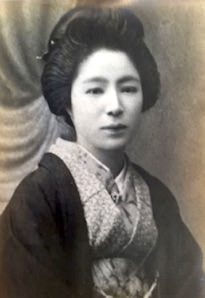
- Born: 1874; Tsuruoka, Yamagata, Japan
- Died: 1896
- Occupation: Writer

Tazawa Inabune (田澤 稲舟), born Tazawa Kin (田澤 錦; 1874-1896), was a Japanese writer.

== Biography ==
She was born in Tsuruoka, Yamagata. Her father, a military doctor, did not approve of her writing ambitions. Her mother was a businessperson, and she also had a younger sister.

She submitted works to literary journals and followed authors there. While living in Tsuruoka she had begun corresponding with Yamada Bimyō, and had adopted the pen name Inafune. She departed for Tokyo with the stated purpose to attend the Kyōritsu Women's Occupational School, where she would learn how to paint. Melek Ortabasi, author of "Tazawa Inabune (1874-1896)", wrote that "one may guess" that the woman's "real goal" was to move to Tokyo since her father was strict, and her father had attempted to arrange a marriage.

She met Bimyō as soon as she arrived, She enrolled in the school, but did not graduate, and she ultimately married him. According to Ortabasi, during Inabune's life, "her fame had at least as much to do with the buzz surrounding her affair with Bimyō as it did her own talent".

During the marriage, Bimyō was having affairs with other women. Inabune lived with Bimyō's mother and paternal grandmother. Inabune had little skill in domestic chores, which would make her task of serving Bimyō's relatives difficult. The marriage attracted scrutiny from the press. After three months they divorced and Inafune was forced to return to her parents' home. The Yomiuri Shimbun published Inabune monogatari ("The Inabune Story"), based on the marriage.

Inabune continued writing even when she was ill with tuberculosis. Ortabasi stated that this may have hastened her death. Inabune died at age 21, in late September 1896. Many newspapers reported that she committed suicide, and another stated "mental derangement" was the cause of her death. Ortabasi wrote that Inabune's death ended Bimyō's career "in large part" because he received criticisms for how he had treated Inabune.

Hasegawa Shigure wrote a fictionalized biography of Inabune as part of Shuntaiki—Meiji Taishō josei shō ("A springtime account—Portraits of women of Meiji and Taishō"), a seven-part series that was serialized in Tokyo Asahi. Ortabasi wrote that, compared to the Yomiuri Shimbun series, this was "more sympathetic". Inabune appears in Dawn to the West by Donald Keene. Keene wrote that Inabune's death was one reason why Bimyō lost his career, and he inaccurately stated that Inabune killed herself.

== Writing style ==
Inabune's earlier works had influences from Bimyō's writing, while her later writing began to diverge in style. Tanaka stated that the Bimyō features seen in the earlier works included "gruesome description" and "unconventional stage props".

== Selected works ==
The following were published prior to Inabune's death:

- Shirobara ("A White Rose", 1895) - A short story
- Komachi yu ("Komachi Bathhouse", 1896) - A short story
- Shinobine ("A Faint Tune", 1896) - A free verse
- Tsuki ni Utau Zange no Hitofushi ("Repentance Uttered to the Moon", 1896) - A free verse

The following were published after Inabune's death:

- "The Temple of Godai" (In Japanese: "Godai-dō", 1896)
  - Translated by Melek Ortabasi into English and printed in The Modern Murasaki: Writing by Women of Meiji Japan. Start p. 160.
- "Yuiga-Dokuson" ("Self-Conceit", 1897) - This is her final work
