= Ryūzaburō Umehara =

Japanese painter

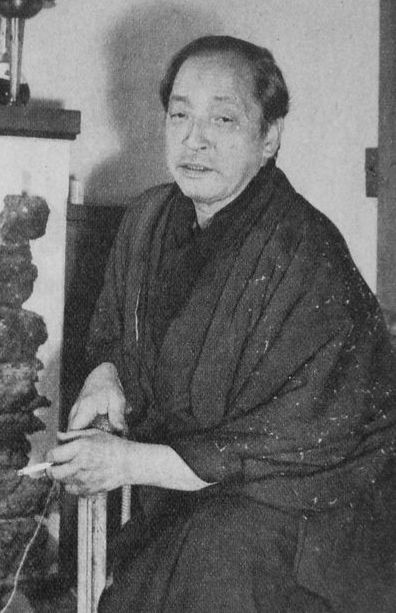
- Born: March 9, 1888; Shimogyō-ku, Kyoto, Japan
- Died: January 16, 1986 (aged 97)
- Occupation: Painter

Ryuzaburo Umehara (梅原 龍三郎, Umehara Ryūzaburō; March 9, 1888 – January 16, 1986) was a Japanese painter who painted in the Yōga style. He was a founding member of the Shunyo-kai art society.

== Biography ==
He attended the Kansai Academy of Art (also known as Kansai Art School) in Kyoto, Japan. He studied under Asai Chū along with Sōtarō Yasui. One of the artists he admired early in his career was Pierre-Auguste Renoir, while another formative influence later on was Georges Rouault. Professor of Art History Torao Miyagawa wrote that:

"Umehara is one of the few Japanese artists of this period who found his style early in his career and then proceeded to perfect it over the years. He is also one of the first Japanese Western-style artists to discard any conscious effort to impose the formal rules or even the emotional overtones of traditional Japanese painting on the Western techniques. He favoured and exploited oils as a means of individual expression, utilizing the texture and strength of these pigments with a boldness and simple directness unrivalled by any of his contemporaries, and not observable to any degree in Japan until after World War II."
