= Sōtarō Yasui =

Japanese painter (1888–1955)

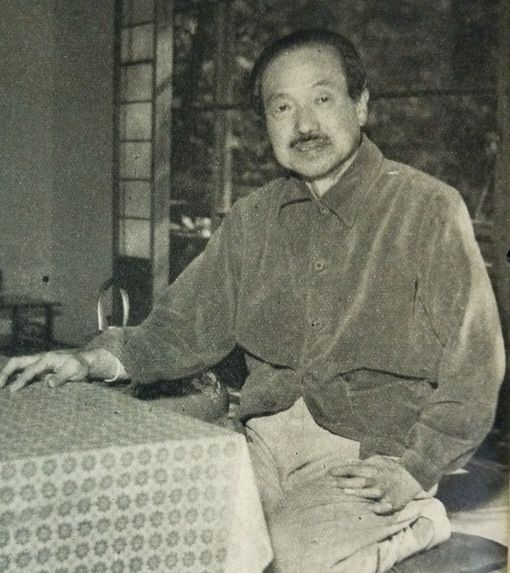
- Yasui in 1952
- Born: May 17, 1888; Kyoto, Japan
- Died: December 14, 1955 (aged 67); Yugawara, Kanagawa, Japan
- Known for: Painting
- Movement: Yōga

Sōtarō Yasui (安井 曾太郎, Yasui Sōtarō; May 17, 1888 – December 14, 1955) was a Japanese painter, noted for development of yōga (Western-style) portraiture in early twentieth-century Japanese painting.

== Biography ==
Yasui was born to a merchant class household in Kyoto, but dropped out of commercial high school against his family's wishes to pursue a career in the arts. He studied oil painting under Asai Chū at the Shōgōin Yōga Kenkyujō and Kansai Bijutsu-in (Kansai Fine Art Academy) together with Ryuzaburo Umehara.

In 1907, at the age of nineteen he moved to Paris to study at the Académie Julian under Jean-Paul Laurens. During this seven years, from 1907 to 1914, he was strongly influenced by the realistic styles of Jean-François Millet, Pierre-Auguste Renoir and, in particular, Paul Cézanne. Forced to return to Japan with the outbreak of World War I, in 1915, he made his debut at the Nikakai (Second Division Society) Exhibition, where he displayed forty-four paintings he had made in Paris. For the next ten years, Yasui suffered from recurring health problems and did not participate in exhibitions, while he attempted to perfect his style, which incorporates clear outlines and vibrant colors in portraits and landscapes, combining western realism with the softer touches of traditional nihonga techniques. In 1930, he displayed these techniques in "A Portrait of a Woman" to wide critical acclaim, and was nominated for membership in the prestigious Imperial Fine Arts Academy in 1935.

From 1936, he cooperated with Ikuma Arishima to establish the Issui-kai, a rival organization to the Nikakai. In the postwar period, many of his works were selected as cover art for the literary magazine Bungeishunjū. From 1944, he was a professor at the Tokyo University of the Arts. In 1952, he received the Order of Culture from the Japanese government. He died in 1955 of acute pneumonia. His grave is at Shokaku temple in Kyoto.

== Noted works ==
- Black-haired Woman (黒き髪の女, Kurki-kami no onna), 1924, BB Plaza Art Museum
- Portrait of a Woman (婦人像, Fujin-zo), 1930, Tokyo National Museum of Modern Art
- Chin-Jung (金蓉), 1934, Tokyo National Museum of Modern Art

金蓉 (Chin-Jung)
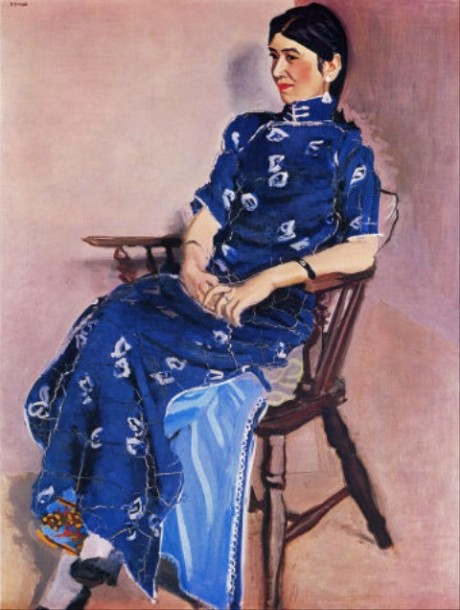
- Artist: Yasui Sōtarō
- Year: 1934
- Medium: oil on canvas
- Dimensions: 96.5 cm × 74.5 cm (38.0 in × 29.3 in)
- Location: Tokyo National Museum of Modern Art, Tokyo

== Bibliography ==
- Keene, Donald. Dawn to the West. Columbia University Press; (1998). ISBN 0-231-11435-4
- Mason, Penelope. History of Japanese Art . Prentice Hall (2005). ISBN 0-13-117602-1
- Miyoshi, Masao. Postmodernism and Japan. Duke University Press (1986) ISBN 0-8223-0896-7
- Sadao, Tsuneko. Discovering the Arts of Japan: A Historical Overview. Kodansha International (2003). ISBN 4-7700-2939-X
- Schaarschmidt Richte. Japanese Modern Art Painting From 1910 . Edition Stemmle. ISBN 3-908161-85-1
- Weisenfeld, Gennifer. MAVO: Japanese Artists and the Avant-Garde, 1905–1931. University of California Press (2001). ISBN 0-520-22338-1
