= Ikuma Arishima =

Japanese novelist and painter

- Arishima Ikuma
- Born: 26 November 1882; Yokohama, Japan
- Died: 15 September 1974 (aged 91); Kamakura, Kanagawa, Japan
- Occupations: Writer, artist
- Writing career
- Genres: short stories, novels, essays
- Literary movement: Shirakaba

Ikuma Arishima (有島 生馬, Arishima Ikuma; November 26, 1882 – September 15, 1974) was the pen-name of Arishima Mibuma, a Japanese novelist and painter active in the Taishō and Shōwa period. He also used Utosei and then Jugatsutei as alternative pen names.

== Early life ==
Ikuma was born in Yokohama into a wealthy family as the son of an ex-samurai official in the Ministry of Finance. His older brother was the writer, Arishima Takeo, and his younger brother, the writer and painter Satomi Ton. He graduated from what is now the Tokyo University of Foreign Studies, where he specialized in the Italian language. After graduation, he studied Western-style painting under Fujishima Takeji. He then went to Europe in 1905 to study painting and sculpture in Italy and France, and was especially drawn to the works of Paul Cézanne.

== Literary career ==
After Ikuma's return to Japan in 1910, he joined the Shirakaba literary circle and participated in production of the first issue their literary magazine. He published new-style poems and short stories in the magazine, and used it as a vehicle to introduce the works of the French impressionist painter Paul Cézanne to the Japanese public.

In 1913, he published his first short story anthology, Kōmori no gotoku ("Like a Bat"), in which he exhibits a harmony between his intuition as a painter and his sensitivity as a poet. In 1914, he suggested the addition of a second oil painting section to the Ministry of Education's annual Exhibition of Fine Arts, but this was turned down. Instead, he founded the Nikakai ("Second Division Society") Exhibition with Ishii Hakutei and Tsuda Seifu as a rival to the official government exhibition. In 1914, he also translated Umberto Boccioni's Manifesto of Futurist Sculpture from the Italian into Japanese, thus introducing the Futurism movement to the Japanese modern art world.

In addition to his painting and translations, he wrote novels, including Nan-ō no Hi ("Days in Southern Europe") and Uso no Hate ("The End of a Lie"). He is also noted for his essay, Bijutsu no Aki ("Autumn of Fine Arts") and for translation of the recollections of Cézanne from French to Japanese.

Ikuma lived in his father's cottage at Kamakura, Kanagawa prefecture from 1893 to 1895; then took up residence in Kamakura permanently from 1920 until his death in 1974. In 1937, he became a member of the Imperial Art Academy. In 1964, he was designated a Person of Cultural Merit by the Japanese government. His grave is at the Kamakura Reien Cemetery.

His house at Inamuragasaki, Kamakura has been physically moved to Shinshūshinmachi in Nagano prefecture, where it now houses the Arishima Ikuma Memorial Museum.

== See also ==
- Japanese literature
- List of Japanese authors
- List of Japanese artists
