= Fujishima Takeji =

Japanese painter

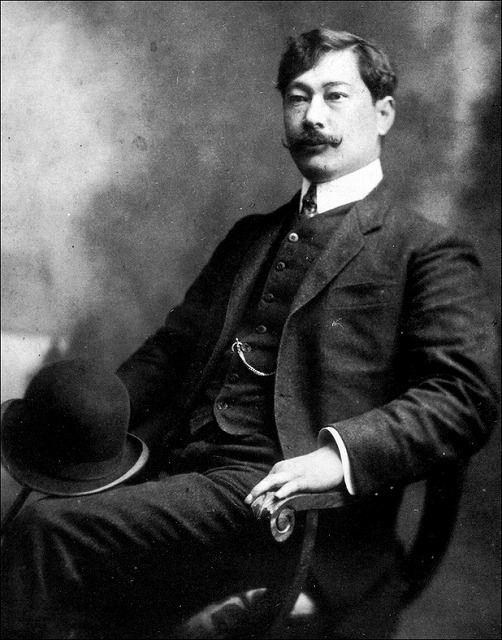
- Fujishima Takeji in France (1905–1910)
- Born: October 15, 1867; Kagoshima Satsuma Domain, Japan
- Died: March 19, 1943 (aged 75); Tokyo, Japan
- Known for: Painting
- Movement: Yōga

Fujishima Takeji (藤島 武二; October 15, 1867 – March 19, 1943) was a Japanese painter, noted for his work in developing Romanticism and impressionism within the yōga (Western-style) art movement in late 19th- and early 20th-century Japanese painting. In his later years, he was influenced by the Art Nouveau movement.

== Biography ==
Fujishima was the third son of Fujishima Masakata. His family had a long connection to the Satsuma domain. He also became head of the household while still in his early teens after his two older brothers died from injuries sustained during the Satsuma Rebellion of 1877. He was born to an ex-samurai class household in Kagoshima, Satsuma Domain in southern Kyūshū, Japan, where his father had been a retainer of the Shimazu clan daimyō. After studying art at Kagoshima Middle School he left home in 1884 to pursue his studies in Tokyo, first with Kawabata Gyokusho, a Shijō school nihonga artist. However, Fujishima was attracted to the new western-style oil painting techniques, and switched to yōga-style painting, which he learned under Yamamoto Hōsui and Soyama Yukihiro. His graduation piece, “Cruelty” was exhibited at the 3rd Meiji Art Association Exhibition in 1891, where it was viewed by noted novelist and art critic Mori Ōgai.

Fujishima moved to Tsu in Mie Prefecture in 1893, where he was an assistant teacher at the Mie Prefectural Elementary School, but soon returned to Tokyo in 1896 under the sponsorship of Kuroda Seiki to become an assistant professor at the Tokyo Art School's Western Painting Department. He also joined Kuroda's art coterie, the Hakubakai (White Horse Society).

Kuroda (Fujishima's mentor and colleague) introduced him to the practice of plein-air painting, which involved working outdoors and observing natural light. Fujishima later became interested in Art Nouveau and other European styles from the end of the nineteenth century. His earlier training in Japanese-style painting also helped influence the decorative characteristics of his later creations.

Around 1900, Fujishima began moving away from Kuroda's approach to natural light. His paintings became more closely reminiscent of the Meiji Romanticism period. This change was interconnected to the literary culture of the period. The poet Yosano Akiko and the magazine Myōjō were also important figures in that cultural movement.Beginning in 1900, Fujishima made cover illustrations for the literary magazine Myōjō. His work during this period showed his budding interest in decorative design. His paintings In Praise of the Tenpyō Era (1902) and Butterflies (1904) helped establish his reputation as an artist. His painting titled Reminiscence of the Tempyo Era (1902) expressed an interest in Japan's Nara period. Fujishima researched about historical art while he was developing the painting. He also drew from ancient Greek art and French painting styles. The work was exhibited at the Seventh Hakubakai Exhibition. It is now held by the Artizon Museum in Tokyo.

Travelling to France in 1905, Fujishima studied the techniques of historical painting under Fernand Cormon at the École nationale supérieure des Beaux-Arts in Paris, and portraiture under Carolus-Duran at the French Academy in Rome in Italy. Fujishima's studies in Europe were funded by Japan's Ministry of Education. He left Japan in 1905 and spent approximately four years abroad. He studied in Paris before moving to Rome. While in Europe, Fujishima came across modern artistic movements with his academic training. He also attended an exhibition of pieces by Paul Gauguin in 1906. The following year he attended an exhibition honouring Paul Cézanne. In Rome, he associated with Italian painters including Giacomo Balla. Furthermore, during his studies in Europe. Fujishima spent around two years in Italy. There, he studied portraiture under the wing of Carolus Duran. His painting Woman of Italy (c. 1908–1909) depicts his academic oil-painting techniques. The period when he painted that work showed his focus on academic technique before he later took to Romantic qualities; showcased in his later works of female portraits. He returned to Japan in 1910 and became a professor at the Tokyo Art School and a member of the Imperial Art Academy. In 1937, he was one of the first recipients of the newly created Order of Culture of the Imperial Japanese government.

During the 1930s, Fujishima produced several landscape paintings that focused on Japanese scenery. These included Surging Waves at Daio Point (1932) and Terraced Fields (1938). His paintings from this time period used clear and bold brushwork to portray the landscape.

Fujishima died in 1943; his grave is at the Aoyama Cemetery, in Tokyo.

Sunrise over the Eastern Sea
- 東海旭光 (Japanese)
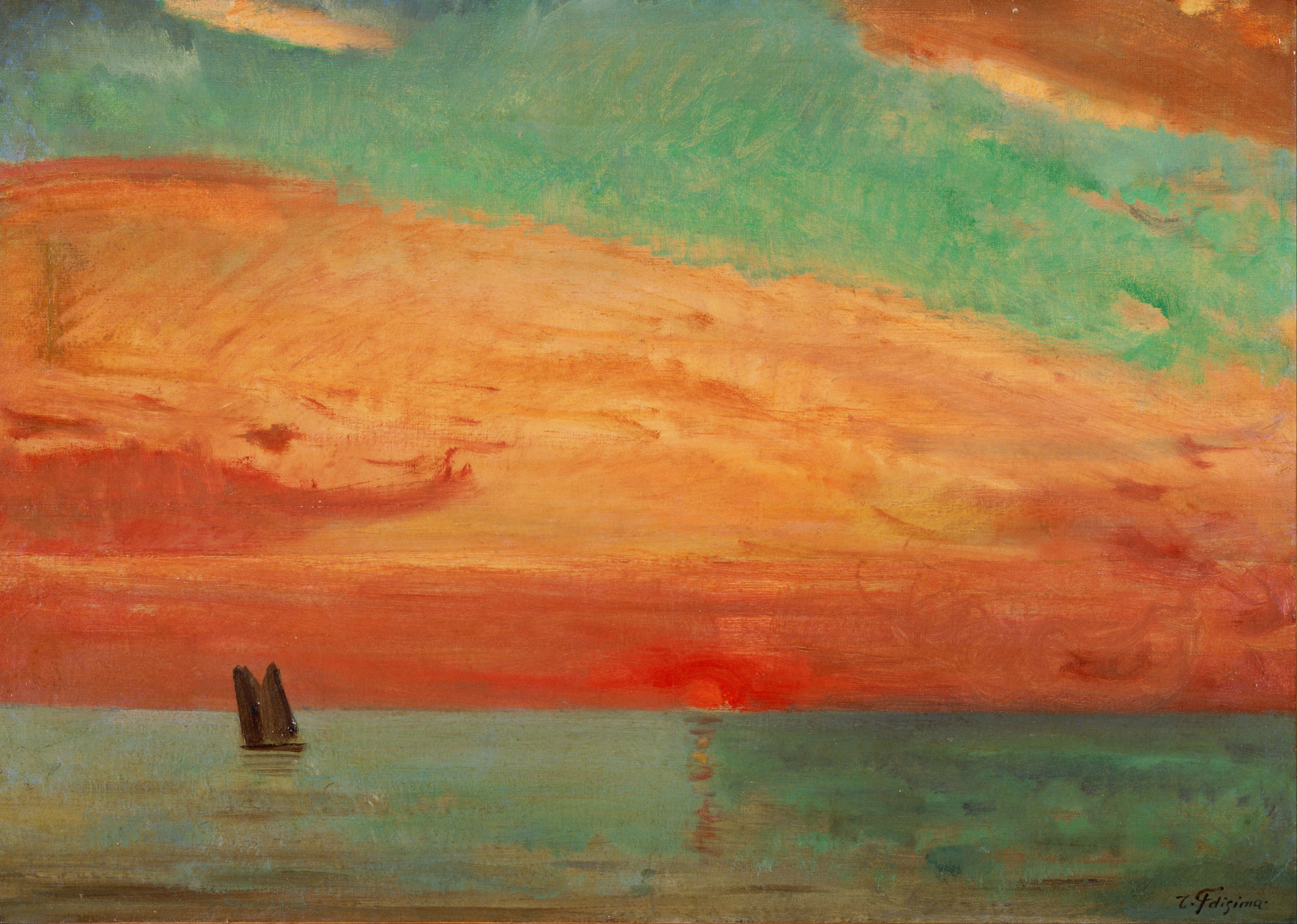
- Artist: Fujishima Takeji
- Year: 1932
- Type: Oil painting
- Dimensions: 65.2 cm × 90.9 cm (25.7 in × 35.8 in)
- Location: Bridgestone Museum of Art, Tokyo

== Noted works ==
- Butterfly (蝶, Chō), 1904, Private Collection, National Important Cultural Property
- Black Fan (黒扇, Kuro ogi), 1909, Bridgestone Museum of Art
- Reminiscence of the Tempyo Era (天平の面影), 1902, Ishibashi Art Museum, National Important Cultural Property
- Sunrise over the Eastern Sea, 1932
