= Yōga =

European style of painting by Japanese artists

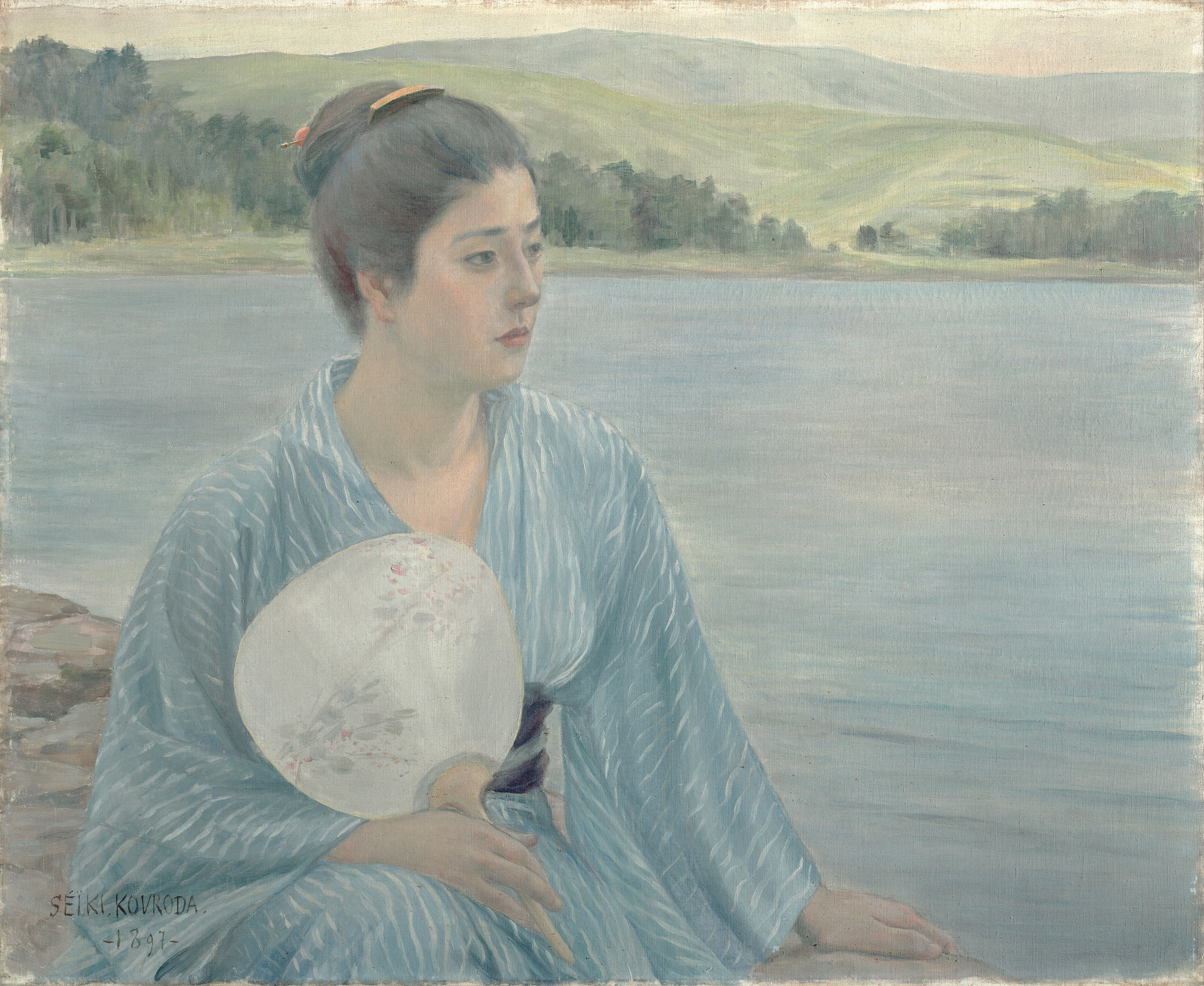
Lake Shore (湖畔), by Kuroda Seiki (1897)

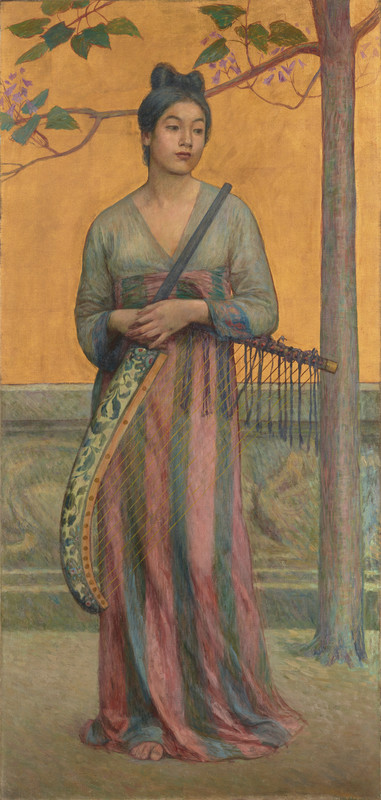
Reminiscence of the Tempyō Era (天平の面影), by Fujishima Takeji (1902)

Yōga (洋画; literally "Western-style painting") is a style of artistic painting in Japan, typically of Japanese subjects, themes, or landscapes, but using Western (European) artistic conventions, techniques, and materials. The term was coined in the Meiji period (1868–1912) to distinguish Western-influenced artwork from indigenous, or more traditional Japanese paintings, or Nihonga (日本画).

== History ==
=== Early works ===
European painting was introduced to Japan during the late Muromachi period along with Christian missionaries from Portugal in 1543. Early religious works by Japanese artists in imitation of works brought by the missionaries can be considered some of the earliest forms of Yōga. However, the policy of national seclusion introduced by the Tokugawa bakufu in the Edo period effectively ended the influence of western art on Japanese painting, with the exception of the use of perspective, which was discovered by Japanese artists in sketches found in European medical and scientific texts imported from the Dutch via Nagasaki. Some Japanese artists incorporated the technique, such as Utagawa Toyoharu in Perspective Pictures of Places in Japan (c. 1772–1781). During the first half of the nineteenth century, some painting works showed influences of Western Art such as prints of Katsushika Hokusai. (c.1760–1849).

=== Rising during the Meiji Period ===
In 1855, the Tokugawa bakufu established the Bansho Shirabesho (Institute for the Study of Barbarian Documents), a translation and research institute for western studies, including a section to investigate western art. This section was headed by Kawakami Tōgai, whose assistant Takahashi Yuichi was a student of English artist Charles Wirgman. In 1868, Togai started a private art school and published A Guide to Western Style Painting (1871). Takahashi is regarded by many as the first true Yōga painter. Yuichi believed that Western style could help to build a Japanese national identity.

In 1876, the Kobu Bijutsu Gakkō (Technical Art School) was established by the Meiji government as Japan's first dedicated Yōga art school. Foreign advisors, such as the Italian artists Antonio Fontanesi, Vicenzo Ragusa and Giovanni Cappelletti were hired by the government to teach Japanese artists, such as Asai Chū in the latest western techniques.

French artist Raphael Collin also taught the Western-style to Japanese artists such as Kuroda Seiki, Fuji Masazo, and Asai Chū. Despite that Impressionism was emerging, Collin was more interested in Neoclassical Academic painting and Naturalism of the Barbizon school.

=== Japanese reaction against Yōga ===
In the 1880s, the general reaction against Westernization and the growth in popularity and strength of the Nihonga movement caused the temporary decline of Yōga. The Kobu Bijutsu Gakkō was forced to close in 1883, and when the Tokyo Bijutsu Gakkō (the forerunner of the Tokyo National University of Fine Arts and Music) was established in 1887, only Nihonga subjects were taught.

However, in 1889, the Meiji Bijutsukai (Meiji Fine Arts Society) was established by Yōga artists, and in 1893, the return of Kuroda Seiki from his studies in Europe gave fresh impetus to the Yōga genre, with the establishment of the Hakuba-kai (White Horse Society). From 1896, a Yōga department was added to the curriculum of the Tokyo Bijutsu Gakkō, and from that point onwards, Yōga has been an accepted component of Japanese painting. Later yōga art societies in Japan included Shunyo-kai art society (related to Nihon Bijutsuin), Teikoku Bijutsuin (the Imperial Fine Arts Academy), and the Nika Association.

Since that time, Yōga and Nihonga have been the two main divisions of modern Japanese painting. This division is reflected in education, the mounting of exhibitions, and the identification of artists. However, in many cases Nihonga artists also adopted realistic Western painting techniques, such as perspective and shading. Because of this tendency to synthesize, although Nihonga forms a distinct category within the Japanese annual Nitten exhibitions, in recent years, it has become increasingly difficult to draw a distinct separation in either techniques or materials between Nihonga and Yōga.

=== Decline ===
During the Pacific War, Yōga’s oil painters used the Western style for highlighting the Japanese War effort. In the post-war era, Yōga was perceived as a conservative style linked to the prewar Japanese establishment.

== Characteristics ==
Yōga has been defined by using the medium and format of the European tradition, such as oils on canvas, watercolors, pastels, and pencil on paper. However, Yōga artists were criticized abroad for lack of authenticity and originality. As an answer to these critics, between the 1920s and 1930s, Yōga painters adopted materials associated with Nihonga and premodern painting traditions for Western topics. Reclining Nude with Toile de Jouy by Foujita Tsuguharu (1886–1968) was an example of this trend. Tsuguharu combined oils with materials proper to Nihonga for the nude.

Yōga in its broadest sense encompasses oil painting, watercolors, pastels, ink sketches, lithography, etching and other techniques developed in western culture. However, in a more limited sense, Yōga is sometimes used specifically to refer to oil painting.

== See also ==
- List of Yōga painters
- Akita ranga - "Dutch pictures", the Edo period predecessor to yōga
- Uki-e - "floating pictures", woodblock prints utilizing western linear perspective.
- Shin-hanga - "New prints", an art movement contemporary with Yōga within the Japanese woodblock print tradition.
- Japonisme
- List of art techniques

== Bibliography ==
- Keene, Donald. Dawn to the West. Columbia University Press; (1998). ISBN 0-231-11435-4
- Mason, Penelope. History of Japanese Art . Prentice Hall (2005). ISBN 0-13-117602-1
- Sadao, Tsuneko. Discovering the Arts of Japan: A Historical Overview. Kodansha International (2003). ISBN 4-7700-2939-X
- Schaarschmidt Richte. Japanese Modern Art Painting From 1910 . Edition Stemmle. ISBN 3-908161-85-1
- Weisenfeld, Gennifer. MAVO: Japanese Artists and the Avant-Garde, 1905-1931. University of California Press (2001). ISBN 0-520-22338-1
