= Meiji Memorial Picture Gallery =

- 聖徳記念絵画館
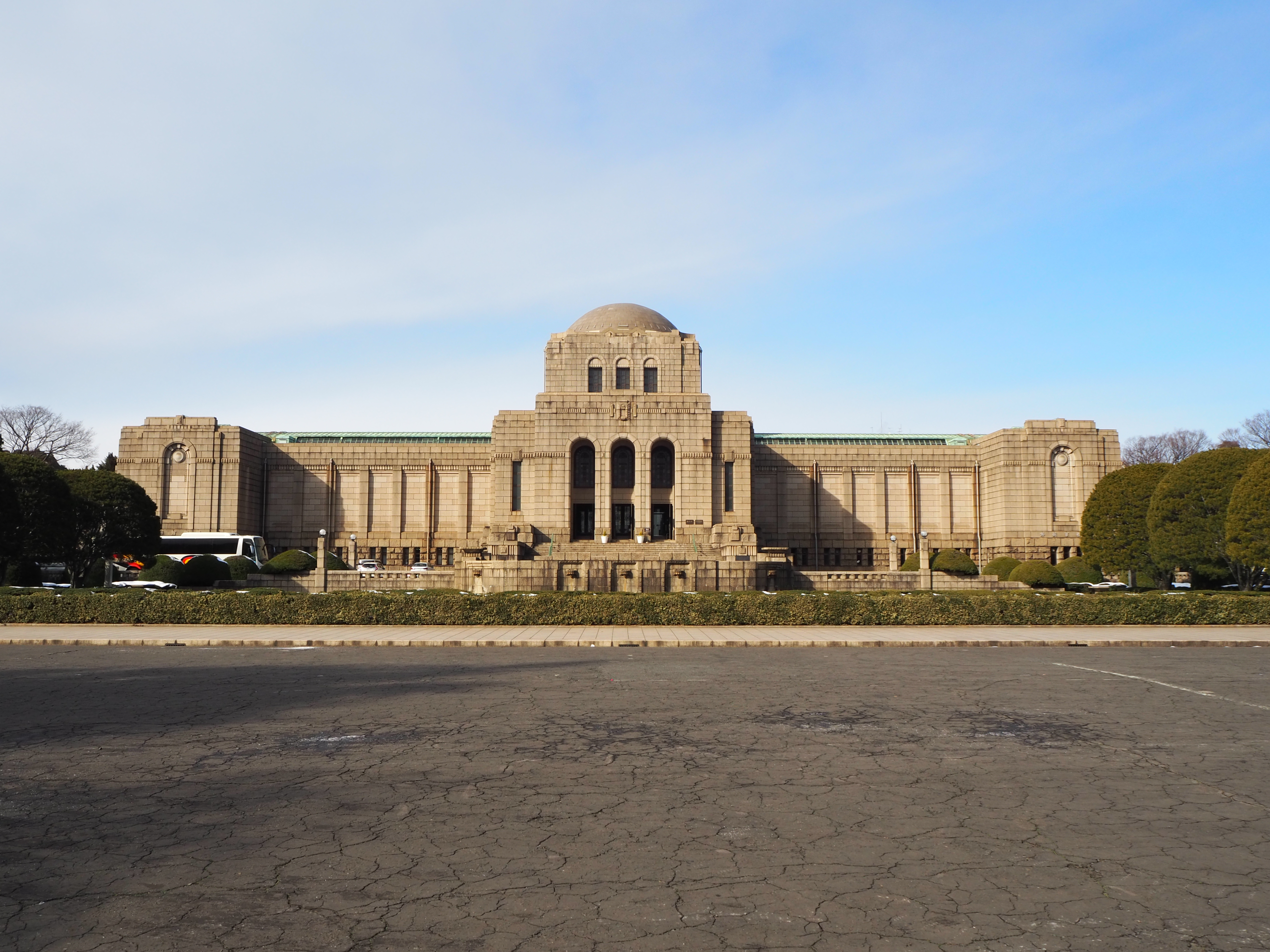
- Aerial view of the gallery

- Location within Tokyo Yamanote Loop Location within Tokyo wards area

General information
- Location: 1-1 Kasumigaoka-machi, Shinjuku, Tōkyō, Japan
- Coordinates: 35°40′44″N 139°43′04″E
- Construction started: 3 October 1919
- Completed: 22 October 1926
- Opened: 23 October 1926

Technical details
- Floor count: Single storey, plus basement
- Floor area: 2,348.52 square metres (25,279.3 sq ft)

Design and construction
- Architects: Kobayashi Masatsugu (design amended by Meiji Jingū Construction Bureau (明治神宮造営局))
- Main contractor: Ōkura Doboku (大倉土木) (now Taisei Corporation)

Website
- Official website

Meiji Memorial Picture Gallery (聖徳記念絵画館, Seitoku Kinen Kaigakan) is a gallery commemorating the "imperial virtues" of Japan's Meiji Emperor, installed on his funeral site in the Gaien or outer precinct of Meiji Shrine in Tōkyō. The gallery is one of the earliest museum buildings in Japan and itself an Important Cultural Property.

On display in the gallery are eighty large paintings, forty in "Japanese style" (Nihonga) and forty in "Western style" (Yōga), that depict, in chronological order, scenes from the Emperor's life and times. The gallery opened to the public in 1926, with the final paintings completed and installed ten years later. The selection and investigation of suitable topics for the paintings was overseen by Kaneko Kentarō, who also served as head of the editorial boards of Dai-Nihon Ishin Shiryō and Meiji Tennōki, major contemporary historiographic undertakings respectively to document the Meiji Restoration (in 4,215 volumes) and the Meiji Emperor and his era (in 260 volumes); as such, the gallery and its paintings may be viewed as a highly visible historiographic project in its own right.

== Background ==
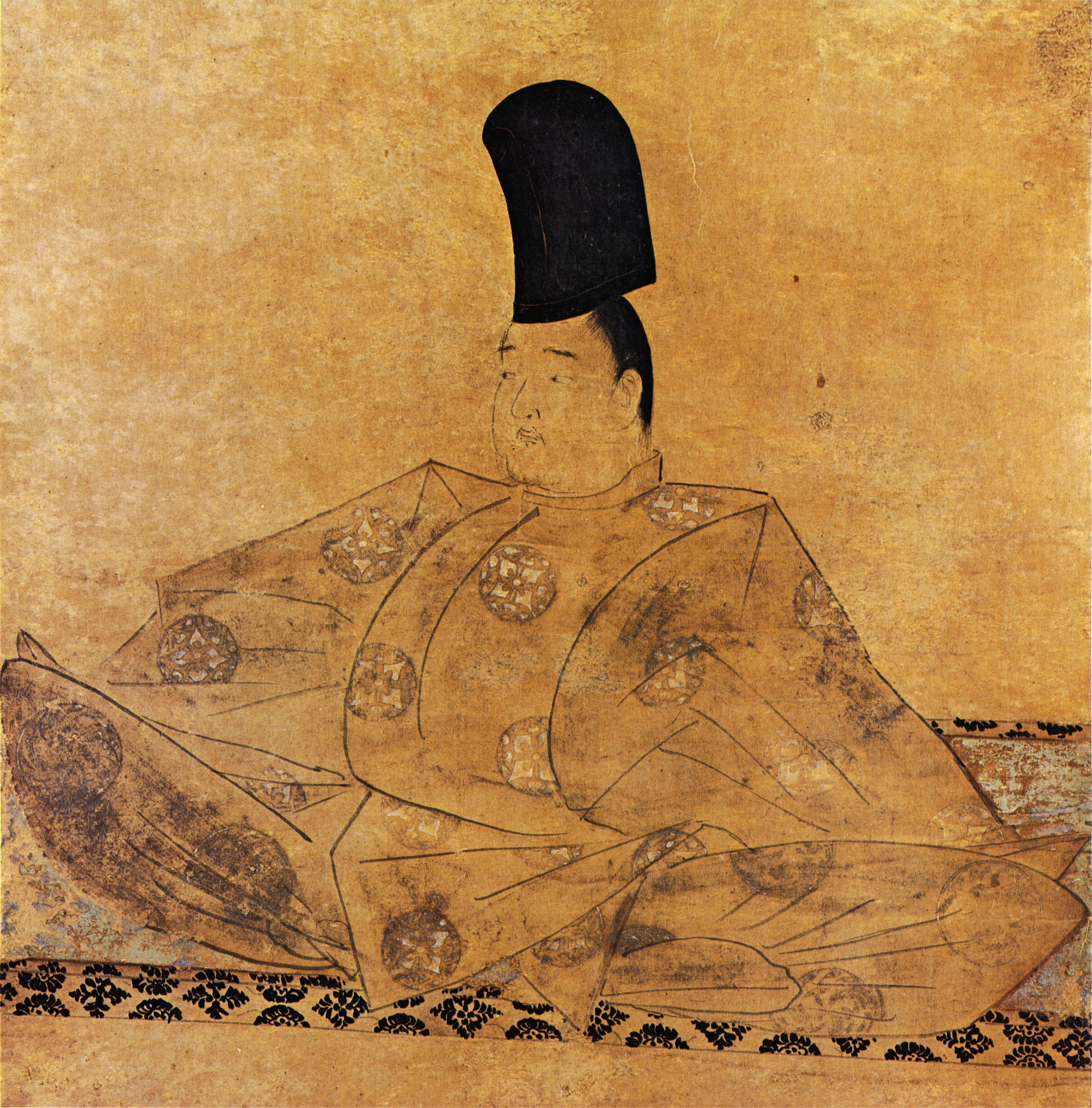
Kamakura period portrait of Emperor Go-Toba, attributed to Fujiwara no Nobuzane (Minase Jingū) (National Treasure)

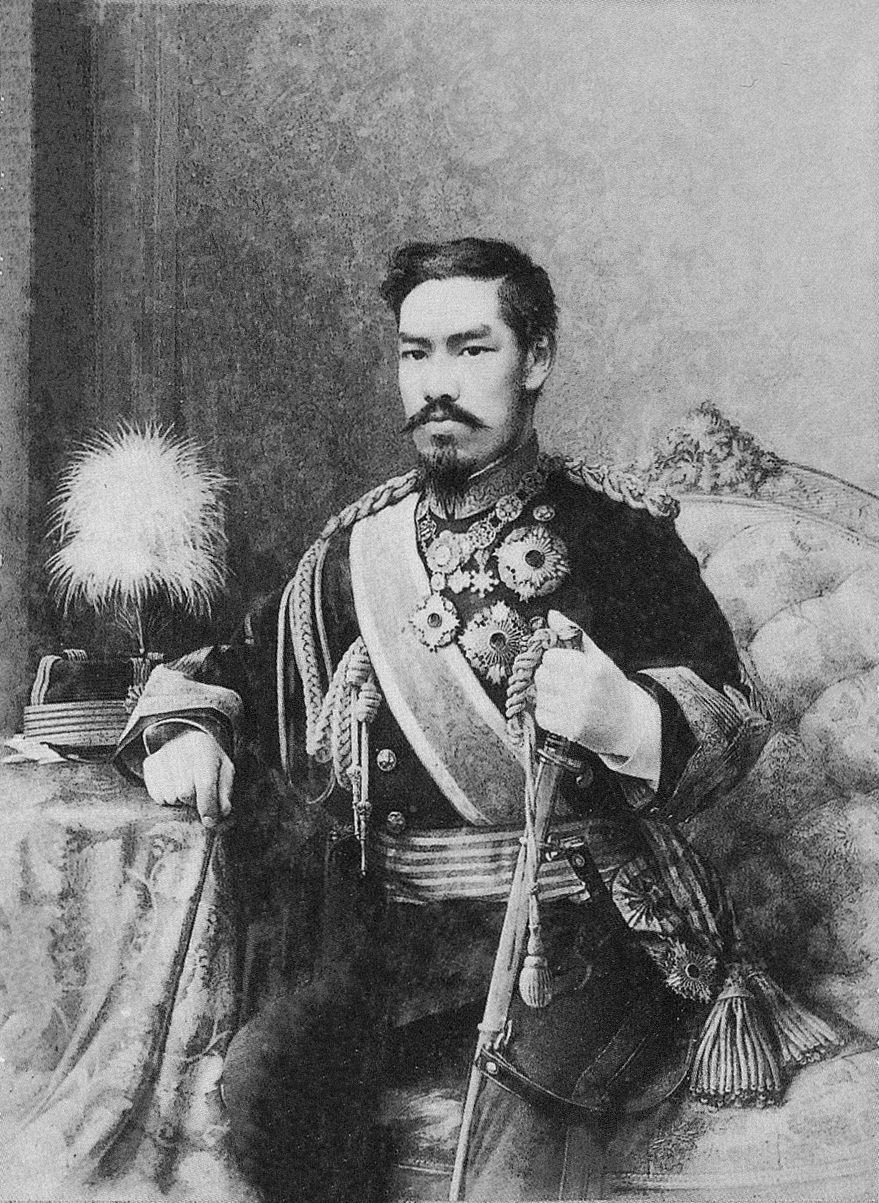
Conté crayon portrait of Emperor Meiji by Edoardo Chiossone (1888), the widely distributed goshin'ei (御真影) ("imperial portrait" or "Emperor's true likeness")

In his brief survey of pre-Meiji Japanese imperial portraiture, surviving exemplars of which are known at least from the Kamakura period, Donald Keene writes that these "reveal very little individuality", eschewing realism "instead to convey courtly elegance or Buddhist consecration". A trend that lasted "well into" the nineteenth century, this was in part also an artefact of the artist typically not knowing what the emperor looked like. The earliest, extant though unpublished, photograph of the Meiji Emperor was taken late in 1871 at the Yokosuka Naval Yard. The next photographs were taken the following year, in response to a request by the Iwakura Mission, delegates having observed Western diplomats exchanging portraits of their respective heads of state. When Itō Hirobumi and Ōkubo Toshimichi briefly returned to Tōkyō, they were instructed to return with an official portrait; though they did not take the 1872 photographs, of the young Emperor in court dress, with them when they set off again for the US, the following year two new photographs, this time of the Emperor of Japan in Western dress, were taken and sent on to the Mission with the earlier pair (selected from the seventy-two taken at the first session). The final official photographs of the Emperor were taken later in 1873 after the return of the Mission, with the Emperor, his top-knot now cut off, in the Western military uniform that was to become his customary attire. These photographs were not widely distributed: when in 1874 someone in Tōkyō began selling unauthorized copies, after debate in government about the propriety of selling such, such sale was prohibited. Continuing to circulate nevertheless, the 16 April 1878 edition of the Yomiuri Shimbun featured a reported sighting of one hanging in a house of ill-repute in the Yoshiwara district, and it was not until 1898 that the official ban was lifted. In the meantime, commissioned by Hijikata Hisamoto, Chiossone's 1888 goshin'ei (御真影) (pictured above) had come to be widely distributed in the form of reproductions, not least, though initially only upon request, to schools across the country, where it helped foster "patriotism and loyalty to the emperor". Around a dozen incidents have been catalogued, between the mid-1890s and 1947, of teachers risking their lives to save this portrait from tsunami, fire, earthquake, air raid, even theft. Such respect and reticence might be understood in the light of the Meiji Constitution, according to Article 3 of which "The Emperor is sacred and inviolable", as well as Itō Hirobumi's Commentaries on the Constitution, in which he observes that the Tennō should not be the subject of common talk.

== The gallery ==
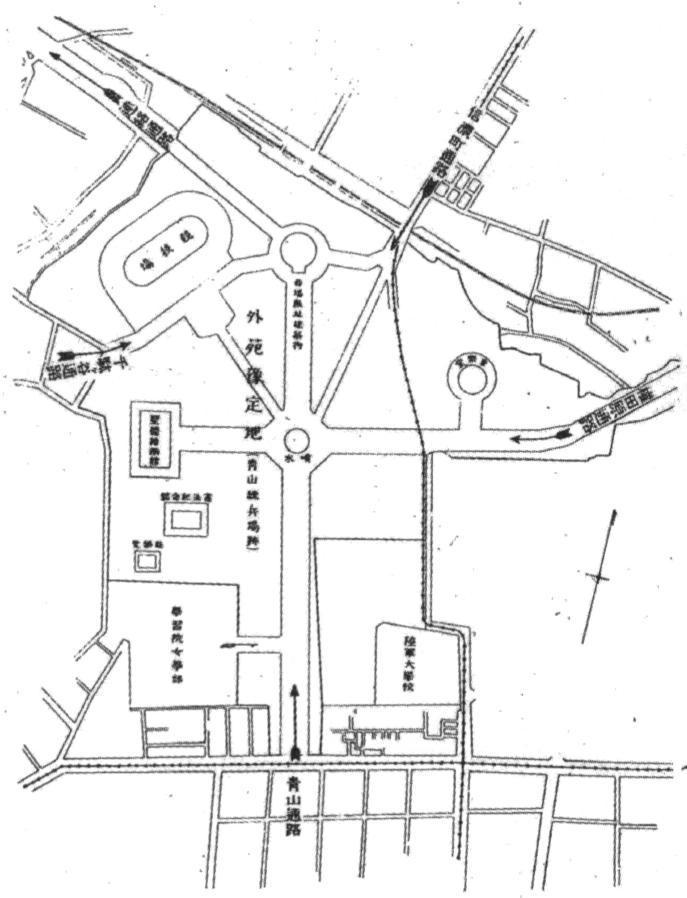
1917 plan for the Gaien, with the gallery off to the left from the central "roundabout", a memorial tower on the site of the Emperor's funeral, on the "roundabout" above

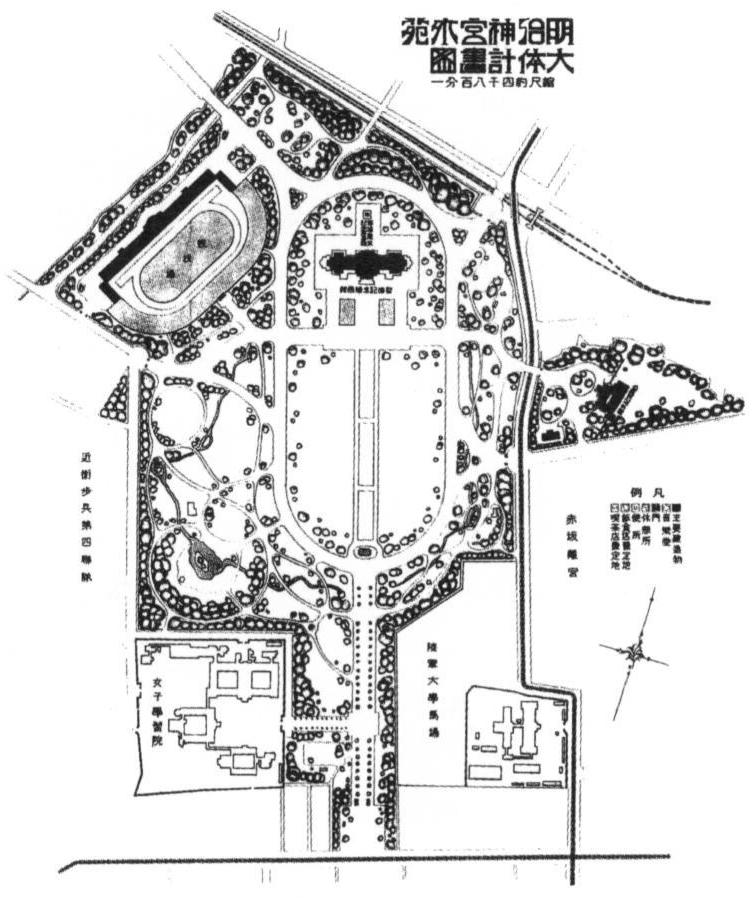
1918 plan, as constructed, with the Meiji Memorial Picture Gallery occupying the site of the Meiji Emperor's funeral

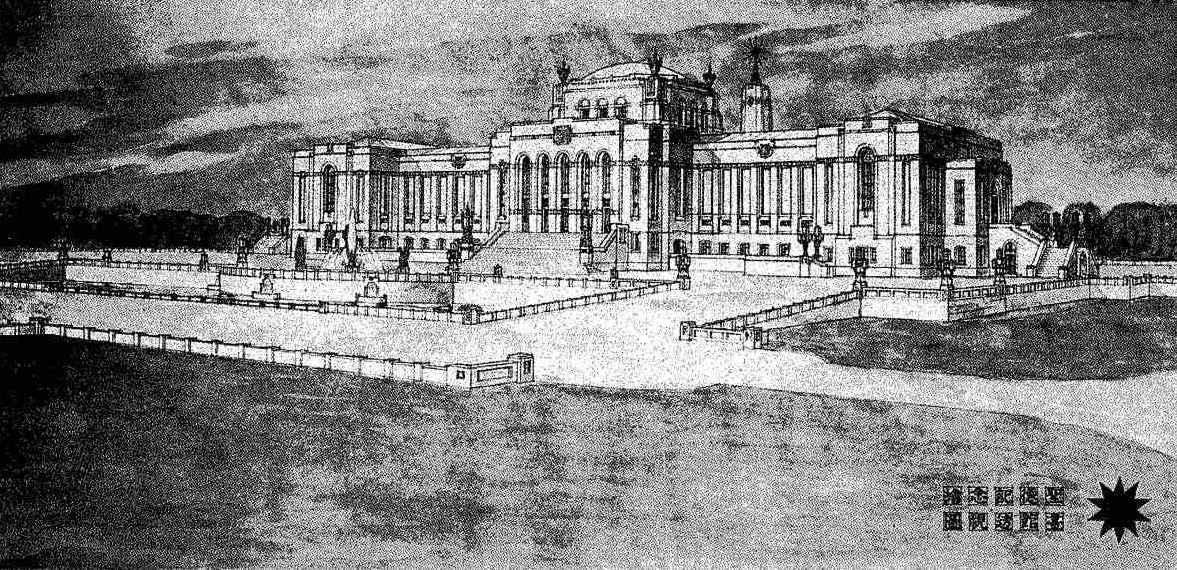
Kobayashi Masatsugu's winning design for the Meiji Memorial Picture Gallery

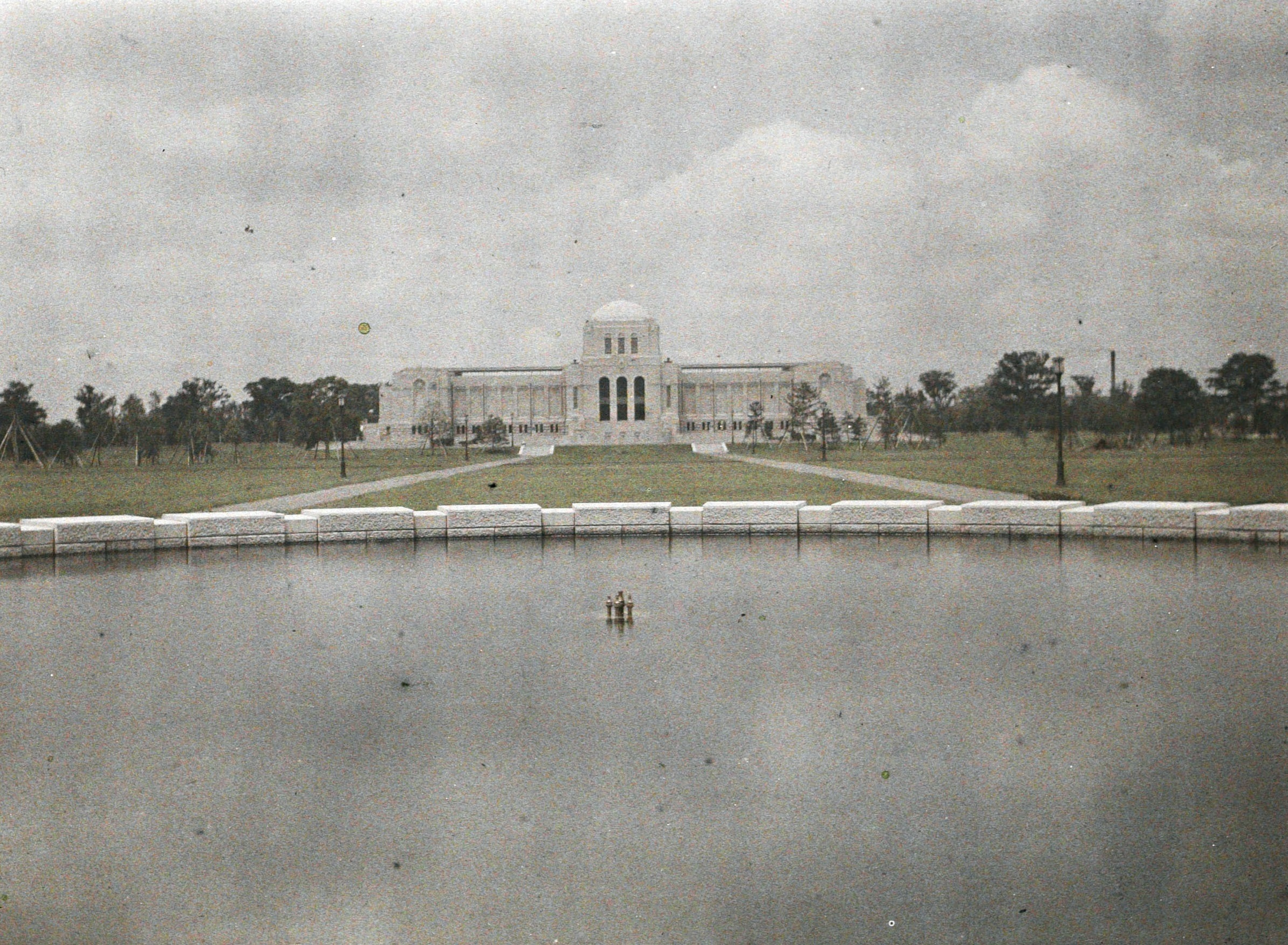
Meiji Memorial Picture Gallery shortly before its opening (1926)

The Naien or inner precinct of Meiji Jingū was constructed between 1912 and 1920, supported by central government funds. In 1915, the Meiji Shrine Support Committee was established to raise funds for and plan the shrine's Gaien, or outer precinct. After a public competition in 1918, Kobayashi Masatsugu's design was the following year selected from the one hundred and fifty-six submissions received, Furuichi Kōi and Itō Chūta numbering amongst the judges. With some amendment by the shrine's building department, construction began in 1919 and ran until 1926, Ōkura Doboku, a legacy firm of what is now Taisei Corporation, starting their work in 1921. This was temporarily suspended due to the Great Kantō earthquake, after which the scaffolding was taken down and temporary barracks built to shelter victims, some 6,400 of whom were accommodated on the site. Construction resumed in May 1924. Internal finishing works began in 1925 and the building phase was completed late the following year. While Ōkura Doboku were responsible for most of the construction work and finishing, the materials were supplied by the government. Gravel was sourced from a government-owned direct collection site along the Sagami River, Asano Cement, a legacy firm of today's Taiheiyō Cement, provided the cement, and steel was brought at a heavily discounted rate from the government-owned Yahata Steel Works, the connecting railways and steamships carrying the loads at half the usual freight rate as their contribution to this important national project.

Of reinforced concrete, the gallery extends some 112 metres (367 ft) from east to west and 34 metres (112 ft) from north to south, rising to a height of 32 metres (105 ft) at the apex of the central dome, its two wings standing some 16 metres (52 ft) high. The outer walls are faced with Mannari granite from Okayama Prefecture, copper sheeting covering much of the roof. The interior takes the form of a spacious central hall, beneath the dome, clad in domestically-sourced marble (56% from Mino-Akasaka in Gifu Prefecture, the remainder from Ehime, Fukushima, Gunma, Okayama, Yamaguchi, &c) and with a marble and mosaic tiled floor; the two painting galleries open off to the sides, each with forty paintings, to the right the first forty nihonga, to the left the forty yōga. One of the earliest museum buildings in the country, the architecture, in which straight lines are emphasized, is "memorable, solid, and stately", and in June 2011 the gallery was designated an Important Cultural Property, for its "excellence of design" and "superior construction techniques", in particular those used in the shell dome and for the lighting the painting galleries, which are naturally lit from above. (Note: 「記念性の高い重厚な外観意匠」「重文指定基準1：(一）意匠的に優秀なもの」「重文指定基準2：(二）技術的に優秀なもの」)

Completed on 22 October 1926, the Gallery specially opened to the public for one day the following day, although at this point only five paintings had been dedicated, one nihonga, four yōga. The same year also saw the dedication of the Gaien or Meiji Shrine's outer gardens, covering some 77 acres (31 ha). From 1 October 1927 the Gallery was open on weekends and public holidays only. 21 April 1936 saw a special commemorative ceremony on the completion of the paintings and exactly one year later the Gallery opened to the public on a full-time basis. In December 1944 the Gallery closed due to the war situation. With the US Occupation, the Gallery was requisitioned by occupying forces (cf., the Bayreuth Festspielhaus), a state of affairs that continued until 1952. More recently, in 2005 2,200 glass plates from the time of construction were found in a gallery storeroom.

== Painting topics ==
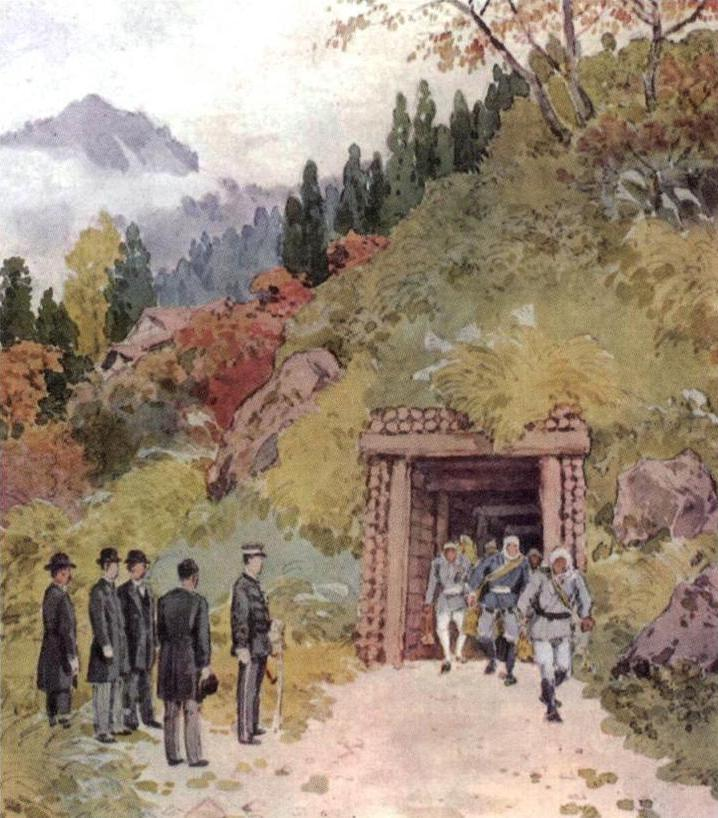
"Preparatory painting" of the Emperor's visit to a silver mine, by Goseda Hōryū

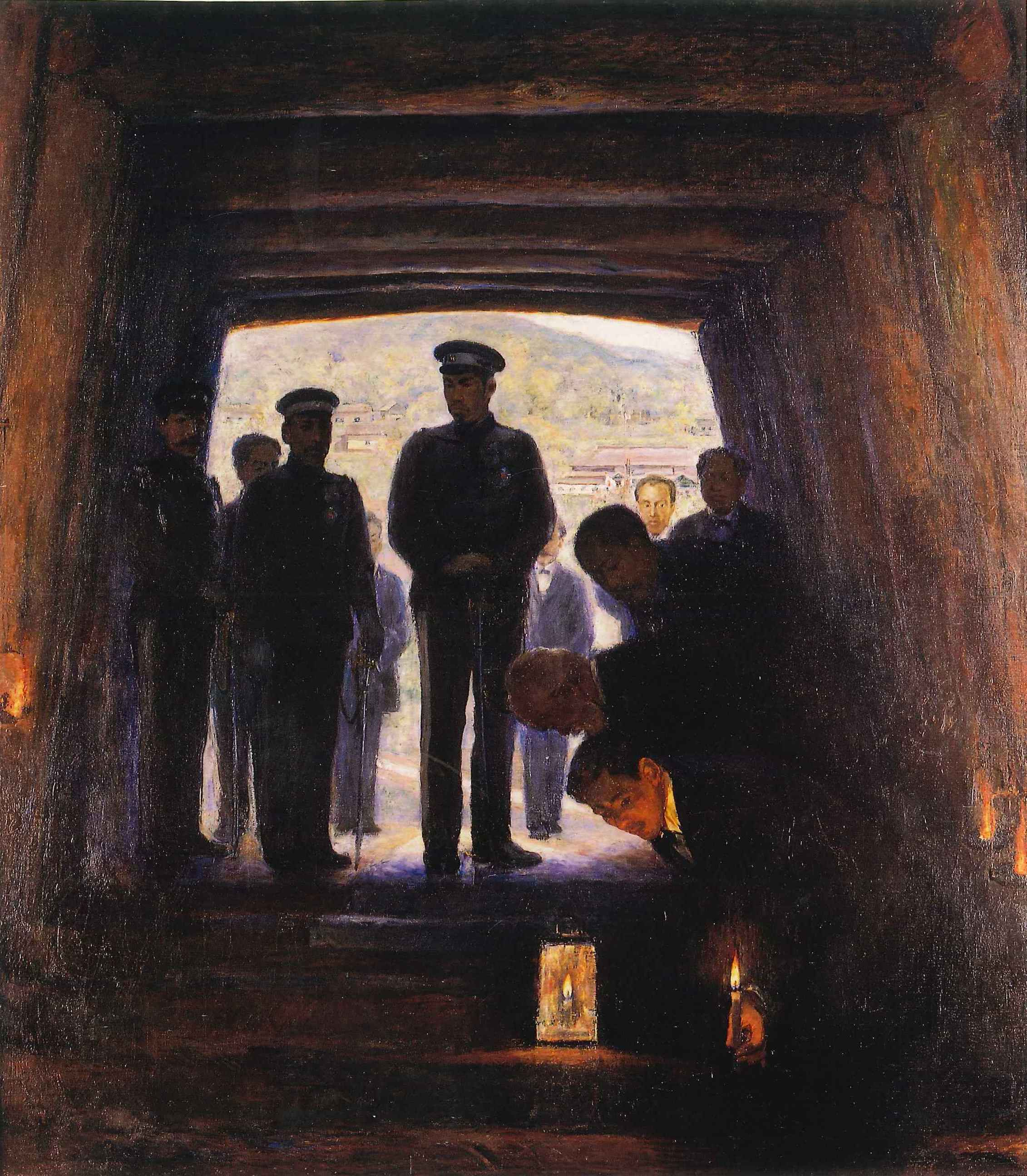
Final painting, by Gomi Seikichi

Discussion of which topics should be selected for the paintings began at committee level at the beginning of 1916 and, two years later, eighty-five possible subjects were selected, those rejected including Commodore Perry's Arrival at Uruga. Later in 1918 a panel of five began their research trips across Japan, to confirm suitability, document locations, and draft explanatory texts, amongst them Goseda Hōryū, who prepared "provisional paintings". In 1921 the final eighty were proposed, and these were approved the following year.

A recent analysis of the subject matter of the paintings has highlighted their range of topic (11 showing palace scenes, 10 grand politics, 11 diplomacy, 18 military, 8 economy, 4 education, 3 health, 3 religion, 1 transport, 5 "love for the people", the remainder cultural pursuits and/or visits to prominent figures), geographic setting (15 in Kyōto, 37 in Tōkyō, also Hokkaidō, Tōhoku, Kantō, Kinki, Chūgoku, Kyūshū, Okinawa, also Taiwan, Manchuria, Korea, Karafuto, and the US, as well as domestic waters and the high seas), and how neither Emperor nor Empress appear in a quarter of the paintings, the Emperor hidden in a further thirteen (the remainder: 15 Emperor standing (including 1 with the Empress), 12 sitting (including 2 with the Empress), 5 riding, 1 in a carriage, 8 the Empress (standing), 1 the Empress (hidden)).

== The paintings ==
While there are eighty paintings, there are not quite eighty different artists, Kondō Shōsen and Yūki Somei responsible for two, and Kobori Tomoto for three. The pictures each measure approximately 3 metres (9.8 ft) by 2.5 metres (8 ft 2 in) to 2.7 metres (8 ft 10 in); as such together they run almost 250 metres (820 ft) and, at this scale, are sometimes described as "murals" (壁画). Tosa washi was selected as the official support for the paintings, although not all artists chose to use it.

	Painting (Note: The eighty paintings are illustrated and described, in Japanese and English, the former identifying all the figures via accompanying labelled line drawings, in Meiji Jingū Gaien, ed. (2001))	Date of event	Painter	Dedication of painting	Comments	Image	Dedicator
1	The Birth of Emperor Meiji 御降誕; Go-kōtan	3 November 1852	Takahashi Shūka (高橋秋華) (1877–1953)	July 1930	depicted is the Lying-in Chamber (御産室), erected by the future emperor's maternal grandfather Nakayama Tadayasu in the grounds of Kyoto Imperial Palace		Marquis Nakayama Sukechika (中山輔親)
2	The Rites of Growth 御深曾木; On-fukasogi	6 May 1860	Kitano Tsunetomi (北野恒富) (1880–1947)	November 1934	ceremonial dressing of the hair, performed by Minister of the Left Ichijō Tadaka (一条忠香) in the Omima		Baron Kōnoike Zenemon (鴻池善右衛門)
3	Investiture of the Crown Prince 立親王宣下; Ritsu shinnō senge	10 November 1860	Hashimoto Eihō (橋本永邦) (1886–1944)	June 1931	Nijō Nariyuki presents the imperial proclamation at the Palace		Mitsubishi Gōshi gaisha
4	Accession to the Throne 践祚; Senso	13 February 1867	Kawasaki Shōko (川崎小虎) (1886–1977)	August 1930	the Emperor, aged fifteen, appointed Nijō Nariyuki as regent in the Seiryōden on the day of his accession	(not public domain until 2047)	Marquis Ikeda Nobumasa (池田宣政)
5	Resignation of the Last Shōgun 大政奉還; Taisei hōkan	7 November 1867	Murata Tanryō (邨田丹陵) (1872–1940)	October 1935	Tokugawa Yoshinobu informs officials of his decision at Nijō-jō		Prince Tokugawa Yoshimitsu (徳川慶光)
6	Restoration of Imperial Rule 王政復古; Ōsei-fukko	3 January 1868	Shimada Bokusen (島田墨仙) (1867–1943)	March 1931	the Emperor abolishes the offices of Sesshō, Kampaku, and Shōgun		Marquis Matsudaira Yasutaka (松平康荘)
7	The Battles of Toba and Fushimi 伏見鳥羽戦; Fushimi-Toba-sen	29 January 1868	Matsubayashi Keigetsu (松林桂月) (1876–1963)	July 1933			Prince Mōri Motoaki (毛利元昭)
8	Attainment of Majority Ceremony 御元服; Go-genpuku	8 February 1868	Itō Kōun (伊東紅雲) (1880–1939)	November 1928	held shortly after the Emperor turned 16; his hairstyle was changed, he donned the robes of manhood, and he was crowned by Prince Fushimi Kuniie		Prince Konoe Fumimaro
9	The Emperor's Visit to the Dajōkan 二条城太政宮代行幸; Nijō-jō Dakōjan dai-gyōkō	25 February 1868	Kobori Tomoto (小堀鞆音) (1864–1931)	April 1933	the Emperor was conveyed to Nijō-jō by palanquin		Baron Mitsui Hachirōemon
10	The Imperial Army Leaves Kyōto 大総督熾仁親王京都進発; Dai-sōtoku Taruhito shinnō Kyōto shinpatsu	8 March 1868	Takatori Wakanari (高取稚成) (1867–1935)	September 1931	Prince Arisugawa Taruhito salutes the Emperor in front of the Kenreimon before setting out for Edo		Marquis Hachisuka Masaaki (蜂須賀正韶)
11	The Emperor Receives Foreign Ministers 各国公使召見; Kakkoku kōshi shōken	23 March 1868	Hiroshima Kōho (広島晃甫) (1889–1951)	November 1930	the Emperor receives Dirk de Graeff van Polsbroek; to the left and right of the imperial dais are Prince Yamashina Akira and Iwakura Tomomi		Marquis Date Muneharu (伊達宗彰)
12	Proclamation of the Imperial Oath 五箇條御誓文; Gokajō no go-seimon	6 April 1868	Inui Nanyō (乾南陽) (1870–1940)	April 1928	Sanjō Sanetomi reads the Oath in Five Articles		Marquis Yamauchi Toyokage (山内豊景)
13	The Surrender of Yedo Castle 江戸開城談判; Edo kaijō danpan	6 April 1868	Yūki Somei (結城素明) (1875–1957)	December 1935	Saigō Takamori and Katsu Kaishū negotiate the surrender without bloodshed of Edo Castle		Marquis Saigō Michinosuke (西郷吉之助), Count Katsu Kuwashi (勝精)
14	The Emperor Reviewing Clan Warships 大阪行幸諸藩軍艦御覧; Ōsaka gyōkō shohan gunkan goran	18 April 1868	Okada Saburōsuke (1869–1939)	April 1936	in Ōsaka Bay		Marquis Nabeshima Naomitsu (鍋島直映)
15	Enthronement of the Emperor 即位礼; Sokui no rei	12 October 1868	Ikai Shōkoku (猪飼嘯谷) (1881–1939)	December 1934	in the grounds of Kyōto Imperial Palace		Kyōto City
16	The Emperor Viewing Rice Harvest 農民収穫御覧; Nōmin shūkaku goran	11 November 1868	Morimura Gitō (森村宜稲) (1872–1938)	August 1930	in Hatchōnowate (八丁畷), Owari Province, while en route to Tōkyō		Marquis Tokugawa Yoshichika (徳川義親)
17	The Emperor Arriving in Tōkyō 東京御着輦; Tōkyō go-chakuren	26 November 1868	Kobori Tomoto (小堀鞆音) (1864–1931)	October 1934	arrival at Edo Castle		Tōkyō City
18	Installation of the Empress 皇后冊立; Kōgō no sakuritsu	9 February 1869	Suga Tatehiko (菅楯彦) (1878–1963)	December 1935	Princess Haruko arrived at the Kyōto Imperial Palace in the traditional ox-cart		Ōsaka City
19	The Emperor at the Grand Shrine of Ise 神宮親謁; Jingū shinetsu	23 April 1869	Matsuoka Eikyū (松岡映丘) (1881–1938)	April 1927	the Emperor left Kyōto for Tōkyō for the second time on 8 April 1869, stopping en route at Ise Jingū		Marquis Ikeda Nakahiro (池田仲博)
20	The End of the Feudal Clans 廃藩置県; Haihan chiken	29 August 1871	Kobori Tomoto (小堀鞆音) (1864–1931)	September 1931	Sanjō Sanetomi reads the edict		Count Sakai Tadamasa (酒井忠正)
21	The Iwakura Mission to America and Europe 岩倉大使欧米派遣; Iwakura taishi Ōbei haken	23 December 1871	Yamaguchi Hōshun (1893–1971)	December 1934	the party board the steamship SS America in the Port of Yokohama	(not public domain until 2041)	Yokohama City
22	The Great Imperial Thanksgiving Rite 大嘗祭; Daijō-sai	28 December 1871	Maeda Seison (1885–1977)	July 1933	performed once by each emperor; the Emperor offers up newly harvested rice and sake	(not public domain until 2047)	Count Kamei Koretsune (亀井茲常)
23	Imperial Tour of Chūgoku and Kyūshū (Entering Nagasaki Port) 中国西国巡幸（長崎御入港） Chūgoku Saikoku junkō (Nagasaki go-nyūkō)	19 July 1872	Yamamoto Morinosuke (山本森之助) (1877–1928)	December 1928	aboard the ironclad Ryūjō		Nagasaki City
24	Imperial Tour of Chūgoku and Kyūshū (The Emperor in Kagoshima) 中国西国巡幸（鹿児島着御） Chūgoku Saikoku junkō (Kagoshima chakugyo)	27 July 1872	Yamanouchi Tamon (山内多門) (1878–1932)	November 1930	the imperial entourage enters the Shimazu residence, where the Emperor stayed nine days		Kagoshima City
25	Opening of the Tokyo-Yokohama Railway 京浜鉄道開業式行幸; Keihin tetsudō kaigyō-shiki gyōkō	14 October 1872	Komura Daiun (小村大雲) (1883–1938)	June 1935	the Emperor arrives at Shimbashi Station by carriage before proceeding to Yokohama Station by train		Ministry of Railways
26	Establishment of the Ryūkyū Clan 琉球藩設置; Ryūkyū-han setchi	3 March 1873	Yamada Shinzan (山田真山) (1885–1977)	December 1928	in 1872 Shō Tai, last king of the Ryūkyū Kingdom, sent an envoy to Tōkyō; the ship is shown returning to Naha	(not public domain until 2047)	Shuri City
27	The Emperor Reviewing Military Manoeuvres 習志野之原演習行幸; Narashino-no-hara enshū gyōkō	30 April 1873	Koyama Eitatsu (小山栄達) (1880–1945)	September 1929	on the Narashino Plain in Chiba Prefecture		Marquis Saigō Jūtoku (西郷従徳)
28	The Empress at a Silk Factory 富岡製糸場行啓; Tomioka seishijō gyōkei	24 June 1873	Arai Kampō (1878–1945)	February 1933	Empress Shōken and Empress Dowager Eishō visit Tomioka Silk Mill		Dainichi Silkworm Society (大日蚕糸会)
29	The Emperor Drilling Soldiers 御練兵; Go-renbei	1874	Machida Kyokukō (町田曲江) (1879–1967)	November 1928	on the grounds of the Akasaka Temporary Palace		Jūgo Bank (十五銀行)
30	His Majesty at Lecture 侍講進講; Jikō shinkō	1874	Dōmoto Inshō (1891–1975)	October 1934	Motoda Nagasane (元田永孚) lectures to the Emperor	(not public domain until 2045)	Bank of Taiwan
31	The Emperor on a Personal Visit 徳川邸行幸; Tokugawa-tei gyōkō	4 April 1875	Kimura Buzan (1876–1942)	December 1930	while viewing cherry blossoms at the residence of Tokugawa Akitake, the Emperor composed a tanka in honour of the loyalty of his host's forebears Tokugawa Mitsukuni and Tokugawa Nariaki		Prince Kuniyuki Tokugawa
32	The Empress Viewing Rice-Planting 皇后宮田植御覧; Kōgō-miya taue goran	18 June 1875	Kondō Shōsen (近藤樵仙) (c.1866–1951)	December 1927	in the grounds of the Akasaka Temporary Palace		Prince Ichijō Sanetaka (一条実孝)
33	The First Conference of Governors 地方官会議臨御; Chihōkan kaigi ringyo	20 June 1875	Isoda Chōshū (磯田長秋) (1880–1947)	January 1928			Marquis Kido Kōichi
34	The Empress at a School for Girls 女子師範学校行啓; Joshi shihan gakkō gyōkei	29 November 1875	Yazawa Gengetsu (矢沢弦月) (1886–1952)	April 1934	the Empress attends the opening ceremony of Tokyo Normal School for Girls		group Ōinkai (桜蔭会)
35	The Emperor Inspecting Horses 奥羽巡幸馬匹御覧; Ōu junkō bahitsu goran	7 July 1876	Neagari Tomiji (根上富治) (1895–1981)	October 1934	at Morioka Hachimangū	(not public domain until 2051)	Nippon Kangyō Bank (日本勧業銀行)
36	The Imperial Mausoleum at Unebi 畝傍陵親謁; Unebi-ryō shinetsu	11 February 1877	Yoshida Shūkō (吉田秋光) (1887–1946)	January 1932	the Emperor worships at the mausoleum of Emperor Jimmu at Unebi		Baron Sumitomo Kichizaemon (住友吉左衛門)
37	The Siege of Kumamoto Castle 西南役熊本籠城; Seinan-eki Kumamoto rōjō	March 1877	Kondō Shōsen (近藤樵仙) (c.1866–1951)	October 1926	rebels under Saigō Takamori shell Kumamoto Castle during the Satsuma Rebellion		Marquis Hosokawa Moritatsu (細川護立)
38	Attending an Industrial Exhibit 内国勧業博覧会行幸啓; Naikoku kangyō hakurankai gyōkō kei	21 August 1877	Yūki Somei (結城素明) (1875–1957)	April 1936	The Emperor and Empress attend the First National Industrial Exhibition in Ueno Park		Marquis Ōkubo Toshinaka (大久保利和)
39	The Emperor and Empress Dowager at a Noh Play 能楽御覧; Nōgaku goran	5 July 1878	Konoshima Ōkoku (木島桜谷) (1877–1938)	December 1934	at the Aoyama Palace		Baron Fujita Heitarō (藤田平太郎)
40	The Empress Composing a Poem 初雁の御歌; Hatsu-gan no o-uta	26 September 1878	Kaburagi Kiyotaka (1878–1972)	February 1932	Empress Shōken composed over thirty thousand poems, including one linking the flight of the wild geese she saw at the Akasaka Temporary Palace with the absent Emperor; her ladies-in-waiting subsequently sent the poem to the Emperor	(not public domain until 2042)	Meiji Jingū Hōsankai (明治神宮奉賛会)
41	The Emperor Meeting General U. S. Grant グラント将軍と御対話; Guranto shōgun to o-taiwa	10 August 1879	Ōkubo Sakujirō (大久保作次郎) (1890–1973)	July 1930	the Emperor and Grant met at the Hama-rikyū Detached Palace, Yoshida Kiyonari serving as interpreter	(not public domain until 2043)	Viscount Shibusawa Eiichi
42	The Emperor in Hokkaidō 北海道巡幸屯田兵御覧; Hokkaidō junkō tondenhei goran	1 September 1881	Takamura Shimpu (高村真夫) (1876–1955)	August 1928	the Emperor visits a tondenhei community in the village of Yamana (山鼻村), now Sapporo		Government of Hokkaidō Agency (北海道庁)
43	Visiting a Silver Mine 山形秋田巡幸鉱山御覧; Yamagata Akita junkō kōzan o	21 September 1881	Gomi Seikichi (五味清吉) (1886–1954)	October 1926	at Innai Silver Mine (院内銀山) in Akita Prefecture		Baron Furukawa Toranosuke (古河虎之助)
44	Establishment of the Monetary Conversion System 兌換制度御治定; Dakan seido go-jijō	14 October 1881	Matsuoka Hisashi (1862–1944)	February 1928	Minister of the Treasury Matsukata Masayoshi explains the currency conversion system to the Emperor		Bank of Japan
45	Imperial Mandate for the Army and Navy 軍人勅諭下賜; Gunjin chokuyu kashi	4 January 1882	Terasaki Takeo (寺崎武男) (1883–1967)	October 1926	the Emperor hands the mandate to Army Minister Ōyama Iwao		Prince Yamagata Isaburō
46	Conference on the Revision of Treaties 条約改正会議; Jōyaku kaisei kaigi	5 April 1882	Ueno Hiroichi (上野広一) (1886–1964)	January 1931	Minister of Foreign Affairs Inoue Kaoru delivers a speech		Marquis Inoue Katsunosuke
47	The Emperor Visiting a Sick Iwakura 岩倉邸行幸; Iwakura-tei gyōkō	19 July 1883	Kita Renzō (北蓮蔵) (1877–1953)	January 1927	Iwakura Tomomi died the following day		Federation of Chambers of Commerce (商業会議所連合会)
48	The Empress at the Peeress' School 華族女学校行啓; Kazoku jogakkō gyōkei	3 November 1885	Atomi Yutaka (跡見泰) (1884–1953)	November 1927	Empress Shōken listens to the Principal reading a congratulatory message to the assembled students and teachers		Tokiwakai (常磐会)
49	Patroness of the Tokyo Charity Hospital 東京慈恵医院行啓; Tōkyō jikei iin gyōkei	9 May 1887	Mitsutani Kunishirō (1874–1936)	May 1927	Empress Shōken donated annually to the hospital and visited regularly		Tōkyō Jikeikai (東京慈恵会)
50	Conference on Drafting a Constitution 枢密院憲法会議; Sūmitsuin kenpō kaigi	18 June 1888	Goseda Hōryū (五姓田芳柳) (1864–1943)	October 1926	Itō Hirobumi explains the draft of the Meiji Constitution to the Emperor and the Privy Council		Prince Itō Hirokuni (伊藤博邦)
51	Promulgation of the Constitution 憲法発布式; Kenpō happu shiki	11 February 1889	Wada Eisaku (1874–1959)	April 1936	the Emperor hands the Meiji Constitution to Prime Minister Kuroda Kiyotaka at a ceremony in the Imperial Palace		Prince Shimazu Tadashige
52	Grand Parade to Celebrate the Constitution 憲法発布観兵式行幸啓; Kenpō happu kanpei shiki gyōkō kei	11 February 1889	Katata Tokurō (片多徳郎) (1889–1934)	February 1928	after promulgation of the Meiji Constitution, the Emperor and Empress leave the Imperial Palace on their way to the Aoyama Parade Grounds (青山練兵場) for a military review		Industrial Bank of Japan
53	Poetry Party at the Imperial Palace 歌御会始; Uta-gokai hajime	18 January 1890	Yamashita Shintarō (1881–1966)	December 1927	held in the Phoenix Hall at the Imperial Palace, with poems composed on the topic of the celebration of national prosperity		Ministry of the Imperial Household
54	The Emperor at Joint Military Manoeuvres 陸海軍大演習御統監; Rikukaigun dai-enshū go-tōkan	31 March 1890	Nahahara Kōtarō (長原孝太郎) (1864–1930)	May 1931	the Emperor watches from a hill near Nagoya during a rain storm		Nagoya City
55	The Imperial Rescript on Education 教育勅語下賜; Kyōiku chokugo kashi	30 October 1890	Ataka Yasugorō (安宅安五郎) (1883–1960)	November 1930	Prime Minister Yamagata Aritomo (in front) and Minister of Education Yoshikawa Akimasa (behind) leave the Imperial Palace with the Rescript		Meikeikai (茗渓会)
56	Inauguration of the First Imperial Diet 帝国議会開院式臨御; Teikoku Gikai kaiin shiki ringyo	29 November 1890	Kosugi Misei (小杉未醒) (1881–1964)	September 1928	Itō Hirobumi, Speaker of the House of Peers, receives the Emperor's message, while Speaker of the House of Representatives Nakajima Nobuyuki (中島信行) stands below		House of Peers, House of Representatives
57	Silver Wedding Anniversary of the Emperor 大婚二十五年祝典; Daikon nijūgo-nen shukuten	9 March 1894	Hasegawa Noboru (長谷川昇) (1886–1973)	June 1927	a performance of traditional dances in the Imperial Palace	(not public domain until 2043)	Kazoku Kaikan
58	The Battle of Pyongyang 日清役平壌戦; Nisshin-eki Pyon'yan-sen	15 September 1894	Kanayama Heizō (1883–1964)	December 1933	the Mixed Ninth Brigade, under General Ōshima Yoshimasa, in action, during the First Sino-Japanese War		Kobe City
59	The Battle of the Yellow Sea 日清役黄海海戦; Nisshin'eki Kō-kai kaisen	17 September 1894	Ōta Kijirō (太田喜二郎) (1883–1951)	July 1934	the Japanese fleet, under Admiral Itō Sukeyuki, engages the Chinese		Ōsaka Shōsen Kabushiki gaisha (大阪商船株式会社)
60	The Emperor at Imperial Headquarters 広島大本営軍務親裁; Hiroshima daihon'ei gunmu shinsai	1894–5	Minami Kunzō (1883–1950)	July 1928	the Emperor as Supreme Commander is briefed by Vice-Chief of the General Staff Kawakami Sōroku at headquarters in Hiroshima		Marquis Asano Nagakoto
61	The Empress Visiting Wounded Soldiers 広島予備病院行啓; Hiroshima yobi byōin gyōkei	22 March 1895	Ishii Hakutei (1882–1958)	December 1929	Empress Shōken visits the Army Auxiliary Hospital in Hiroshima		Japanese Association of Medical Sciences, Japan Medical Association
62	Peace Conference at Shimonoseki 下関講和談判; Shimonoseki kōwa danpan	17 April 1895	Nagatochi Hideta (永地秀太) (1873–1942)		the signing of the treaty		Shimonoseki City
63	Restoration of Peace in Taiwan 台湾鎮定; Taiwan chintei	11 June 1895	Ishikawa Toraji (石川寅治) (1875–1964)	April 1928	Prince Kitashirakawa Yoshihisa enters Taipei		Government-General of Taiwan
64	The Emperor at Yasukuni Shrine 靖国神社行幸; Yasukuni Jinja gyōkō	17 December 1895	Shimizu Yoshio (清水良雄) (1891–1954)	July 1929	the Emperor ascends the stairs to honour those who fell in the First Sino-Japanese War		Daiichi Bank (第一銀行)
65	Shintenfu Hall 振天府; Shintenfu	March 1897	Kawamura Kiyoo (1852–1934)	October 1931	the hall was built in the grounds of the Imperial Palace to house items relating to the war, including photographs of all the officers and the names of all the dead		Prince Tokugawa Iesato
66	The Anglo-Japanese Treaty of Alliance 日英同盟; Nichiei dōmei	12 February 1902	Yamamoto Kanae (1882–1946)	October 1932	Prime Minister Katsura Tarō reads the Treaty to the House of Peers		Bank of Chōsen
67	The Empress at a Red Cross Meeting 赤十字社総会行啓; Akajūji-sha sōkai gyōkei	21 October 1902	Yuasa Ichirō (湯浅一郎) (1869–1931)	July 1929	Empress Shōken addresses the 11th General Meeting of the Japanese Red Cross Society in Ueno Park		Japanese Red Cross Society
68	Declaration of War with Russia 対露宣戦布告御前会議 tai-Ro sensen fukoku gozen kaigi	4 February 1904	Yoshida Shigeru (吉田苞) (1883–1953)	March 1934	the Emperor, Prime Minister Katsura Tarō, elder statesman Itō Hirobumi, and others agree to the declaration of war with Russia at a Gozen Kaigi		Prince Matsukata Iwao (松方巌)
69	The Surrender of Port Arthur 日露役旅順開城; Nichiro-eki ryojun kaijō	5 January 1905	Arai Rokuo (荒井陸男) (1885–1972)	October 1928	General Anatoly Stessel presents his horse to General Nogi Maresuke in the village where the surrender was signed three days earlier	(not public domain until 2042)	Kwantung Government (関東庁)
70	The Battle of Mukden 日露役奉天戦; Nochiro-eki Hōten-sen	15 March 1905	Kanokogi Takeshirō (1874–1941)	October 1926	General Ōyama Iwao and his staff enter the South Gate of Mukden, after the city fell on the 10th		South Manchuria Railway Company
71	The Battle of the Japan Sea 日露役日本海海戦; Nichiro-eki Nihon-kai kaisen	27 May 1905	Nakamura Fusetsu (1866–1943)	October 1928	Admiral Tōgō Heihachirō's flagship, the Mikasa, leads the Japanese fleet into action at the Battle of Tsushima		Nippon Yusen Kabushiki gaisha
72	The Portsmouth Peace Conference ポーツマス講和談判; Pōtsumasu kōwa danpan	5 September 1905	Shirataki Ikunosuke (白滝幾之助) (1873–1960)	November 1931	Komura Jutarō, Sergei Witte, and others sign the Treaty, bringing to an end the Russo-Japanese War		Yokohama Specie Bank
73	The Triumphal Grand Naval Review 凱旋観艦式; Gaisen kankan shiki	23 October 1905	Tōjō Shōtarō (東城鉦太郎) (1865–1929)	May 1929	the Emperor aboard the Asama reviews the Combined Fleet in Yokohama Bay on 23 October 1905, with Commander-in-Chief Tōgō Heihachirō to his left and the future Taishō Emperor to his right, flanked in turn by Navy Minister Yamamoto Gonnohyōe and Chief of the Navy General Staff Itō Sukeyuki; over 160 vessels took part in the 1905 Triumphal Grand Review that celebrated the navy's contribution to victory in the Russo-Japanese War		Ministry of the Navy
74	The Triumphal Grand Army Review 凱旋観兵式; Gaisen kanbei shiki	30 April 1906	Kobayashi Mango (小林万吾) (1870–1947)	December 1931	the Emperor reviews the troops at the Aoyama Parade Grounds (東京青山練兵場), with Ōyama Iwao riding behind		Ministry of the Army
75	Demarcation of the Sakhalin Frontier 樺太国境画定; Karafuto kokkyō kakutei	June 1906	Yasuda Minoru (安田稔) (1881–1965)	December 1932	Japanese and Russian representatives designate the boundary marker on the 50th parallel, after the Treaty of Portsmouth		Nippon Oil Kabushiki gaisha
76	The Chrysanthemum Garden Party 観菊会; Kangikukai	19 November 1909	Nakazawa Hiromitsu (中沢弘光) (1874–1964)	May 1931	the Emperor and Empress attend the party at the Akasaka Palace for the first time		Marquis Tokugawa Yorisada (徳川頼貞)
77	The Union of Korea and Japan 日韓合邦; Nikkan gappō	22 August 1910	Tsuji Hisashi (辻永) (1884–1974)	October 1927	depicted is the Namdaemun at the time of annexation	(not public domain until 2044)	The Provinces of Korea
78	The Emperor at Tokyo Imperial University 東京帝国大学行幸; Tōkyō Teikoku Daigaku gyōkō	10 July 1912	Fujishima Takeji (1867–1943)	April 1936	the arrival of the Emperor for the graduation ceremonies		Marquis Maeda Toshinari
79	The Emperor's Final Illness 不豫; Fuyo	July 1912	Tanabe Itaru (田辺至) (1886–1968)	March 1927	as the Emperor's condition worsened, people gather outside the Tokyo Imperial Palace to pray for his recovery	(not public domain until 2038)	Tōkyō Prefecture
80	The Imperial Funeral 大葬; Taisō	14 September 1912	Wada Sanzō (1883–1967)	July 1933	after a ceremony at the Aoyama Funeral Pavilion (青山葬場殿) in Tōkyō on 13 September, the Emperor's coffin was taken by train to Kyōto, before being conveyed to Fushimi Momoyama no Misasagi (伏見桃山陵)		Meiji Jingū Commemorative Association (明治神宮奉賛会)

== Related plans and period photographs ==
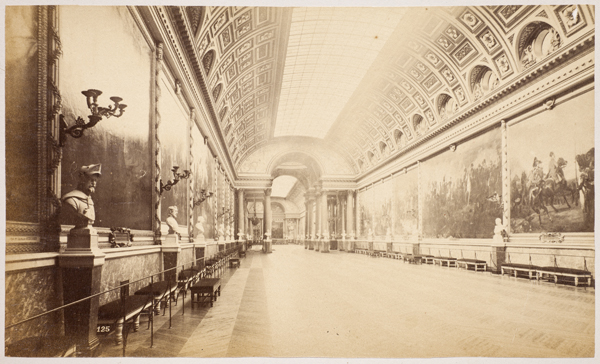
1901 image of the Galerie des Batailles at the Palace of Versailles; Terasaki Takeo, artist of painting #45, included an image in a report in which he cited Napoleon's "triumphal appropriation" of mural painting for nation-building purposes

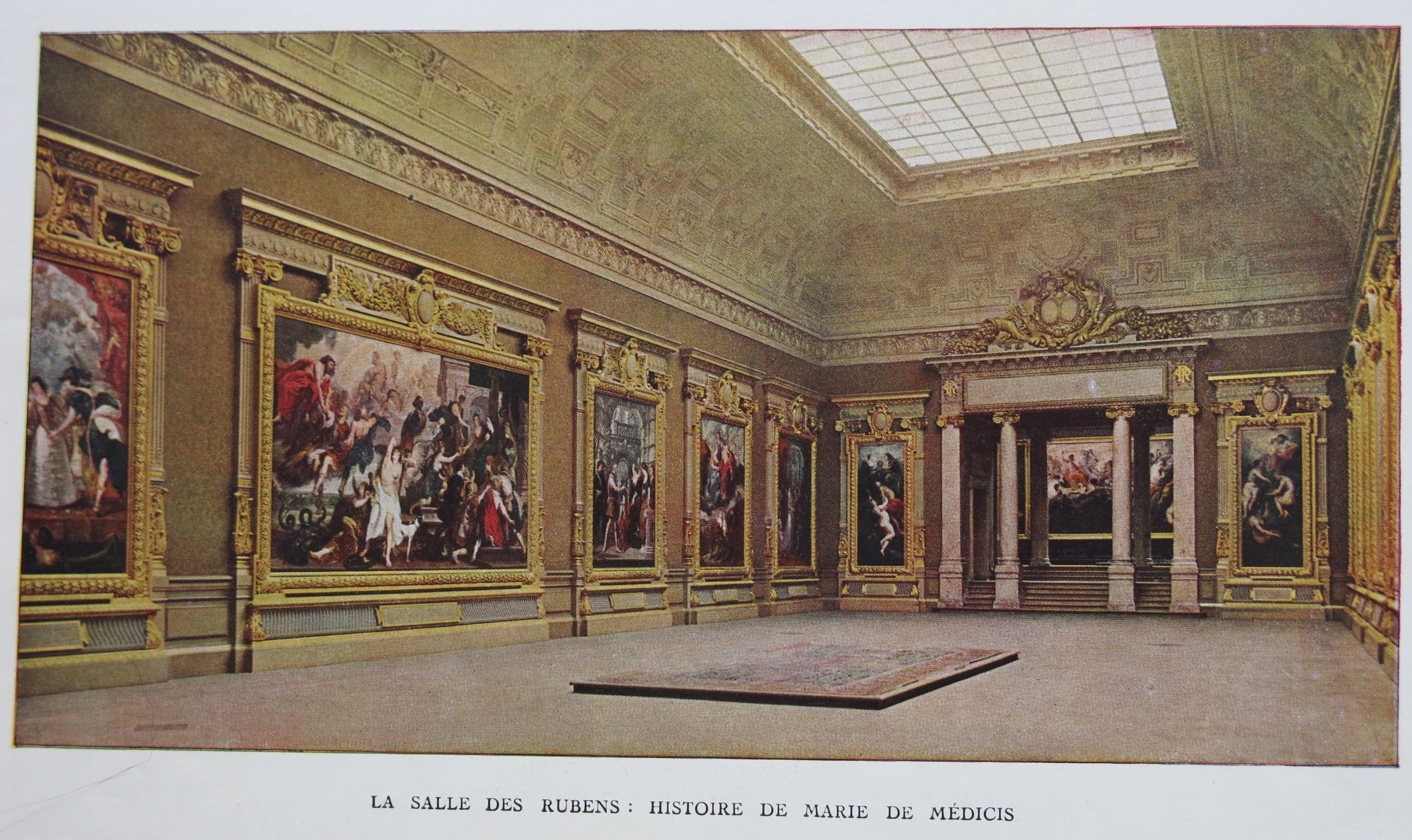
1929 image of the Galerie des Rubens at the Louvre; Terasaki Takeo similarly included an image in his report, preferring this room for its spacing between the paintings and the way they are emphasized by the less ornate envelope

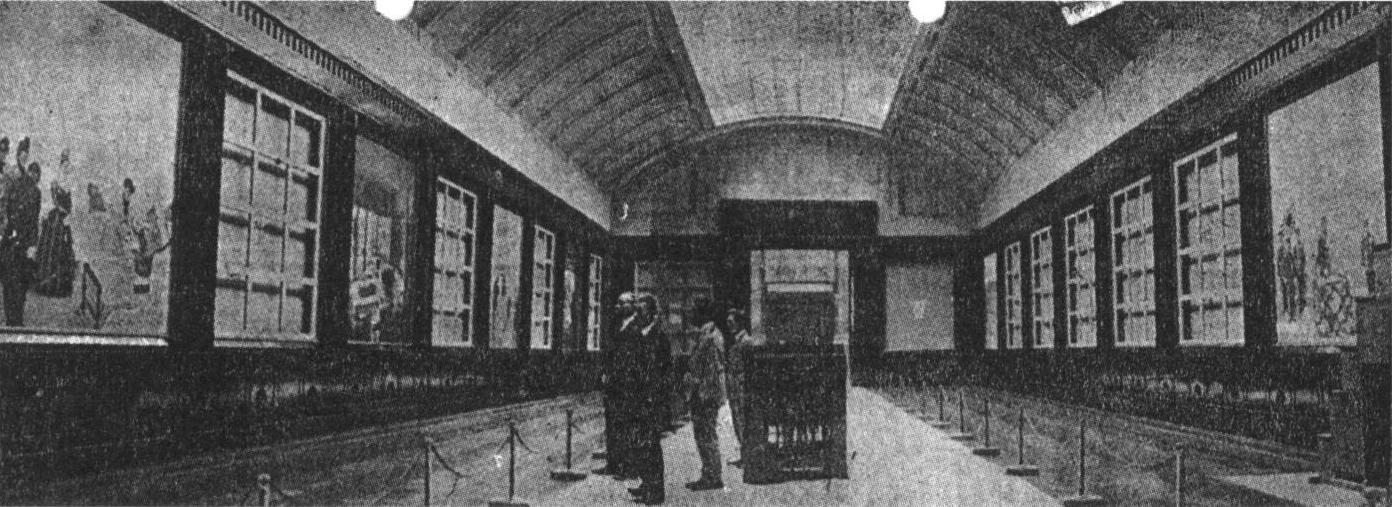
Interior of the Meiji Memorial Picture Gallery in 1927, from the Tokyo Nichi Nichi Shimbun, with many of the paintings yet to be completed and installed

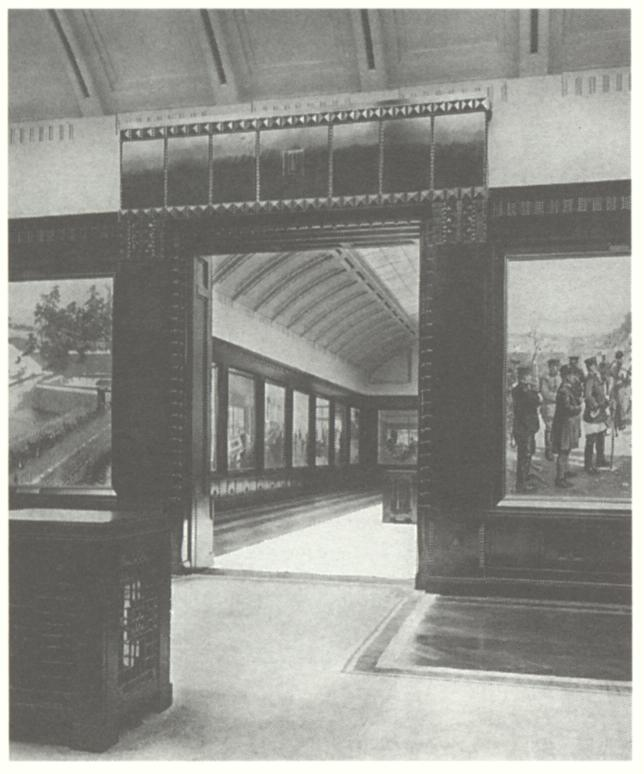
Interior, in a 1932 Meiji Jingū publication

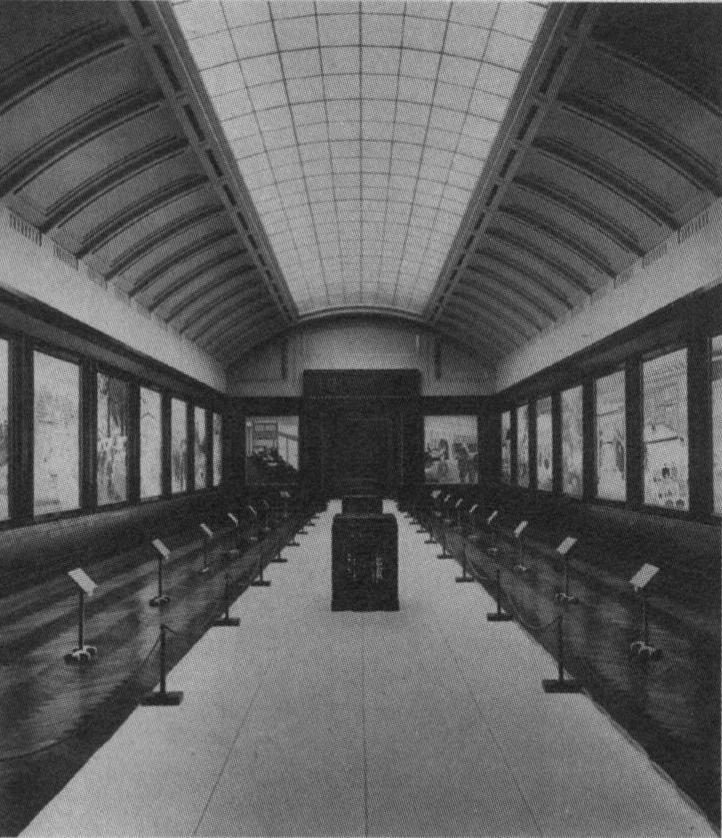
Interior, in a 1937 Meiji Jingū publication

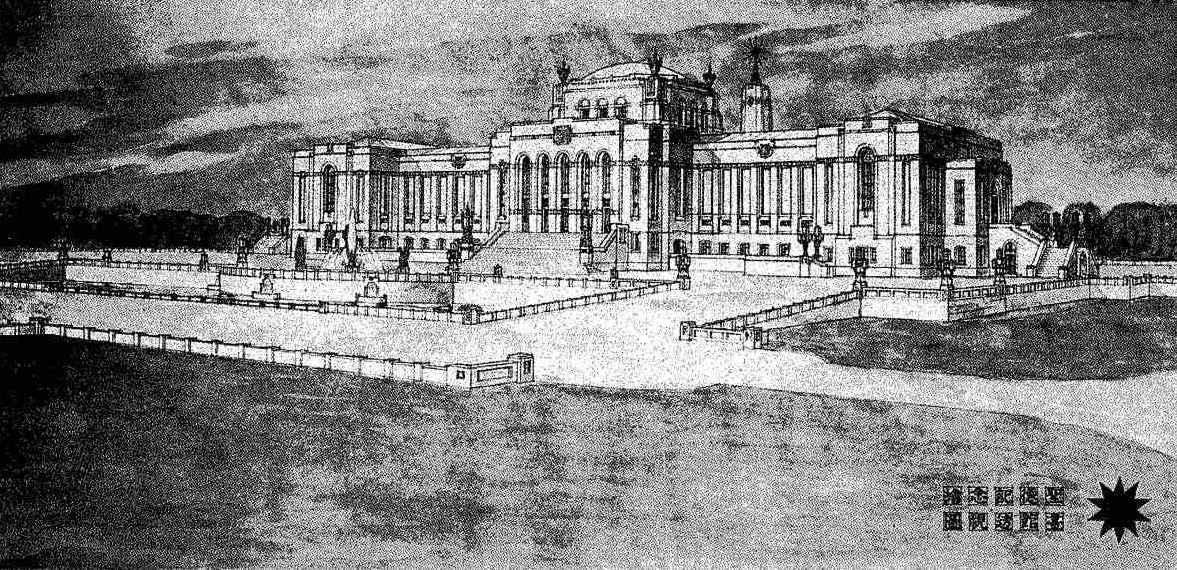
Kobayashi Masatsugu's winning design for the Meiji Memorial Picture Gallery; front

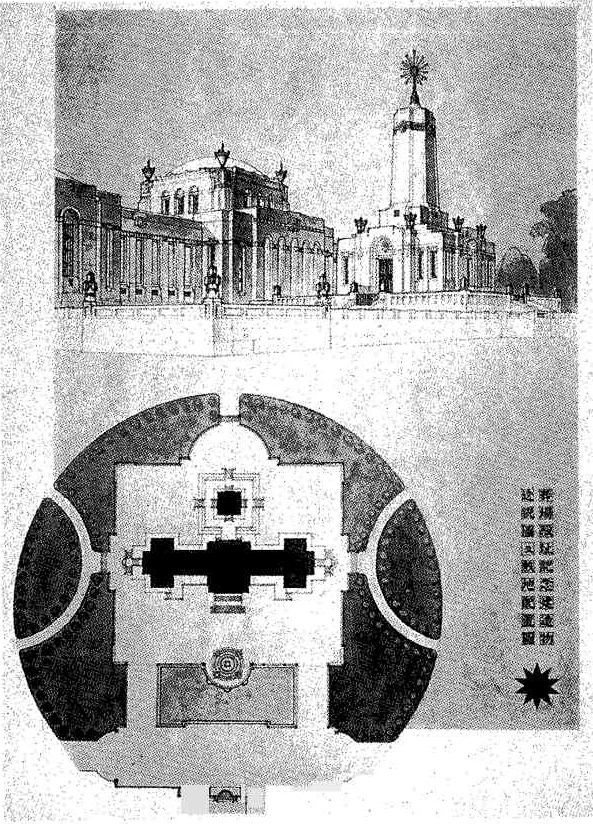
Rear

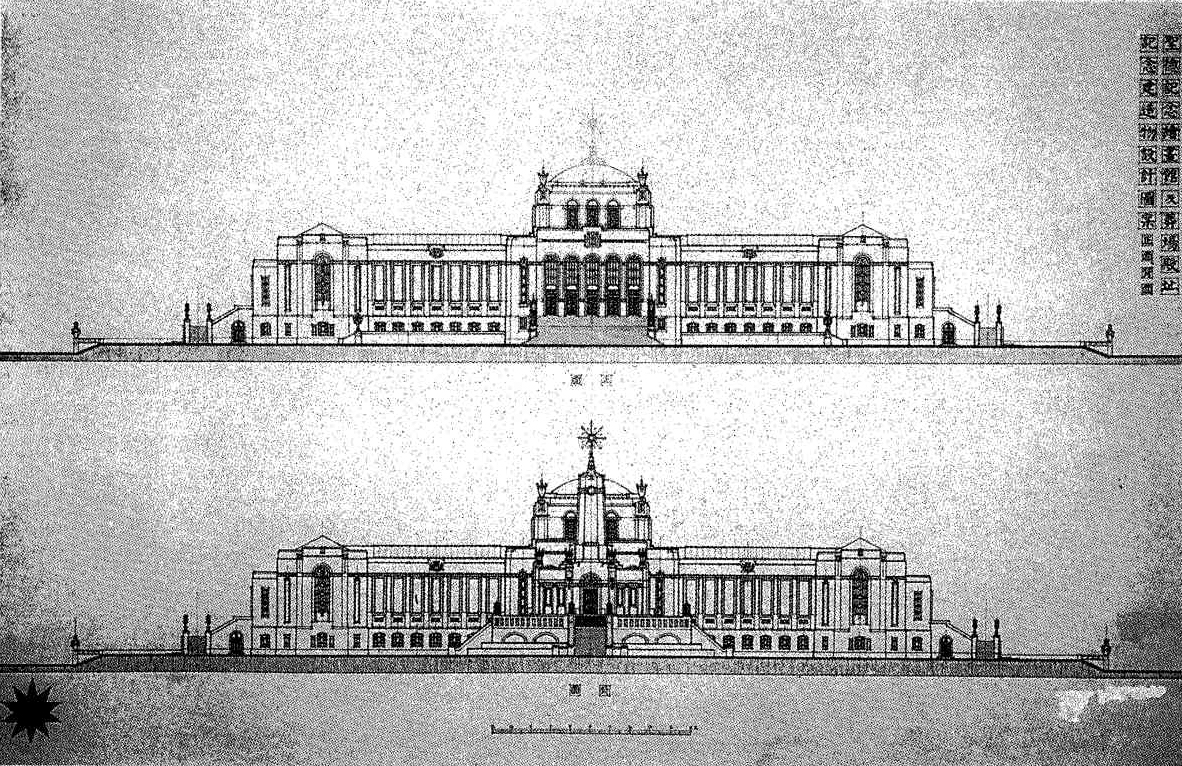
Front and rear elevations

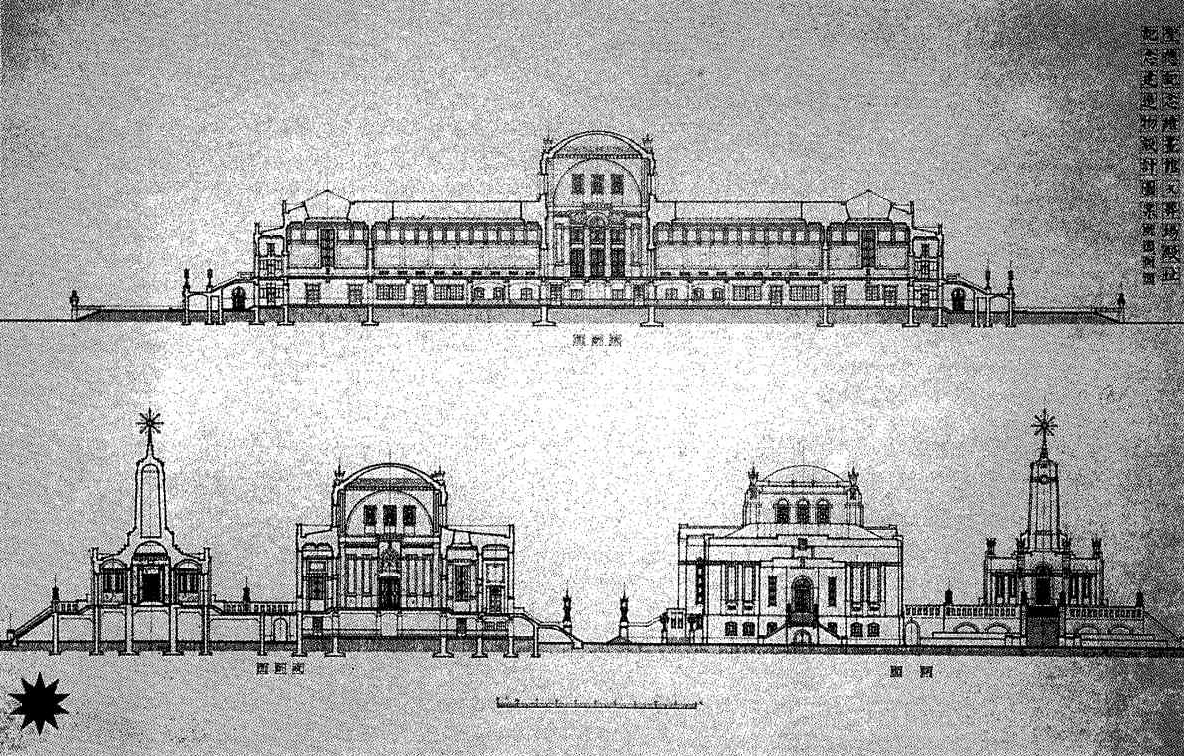
Cross sections

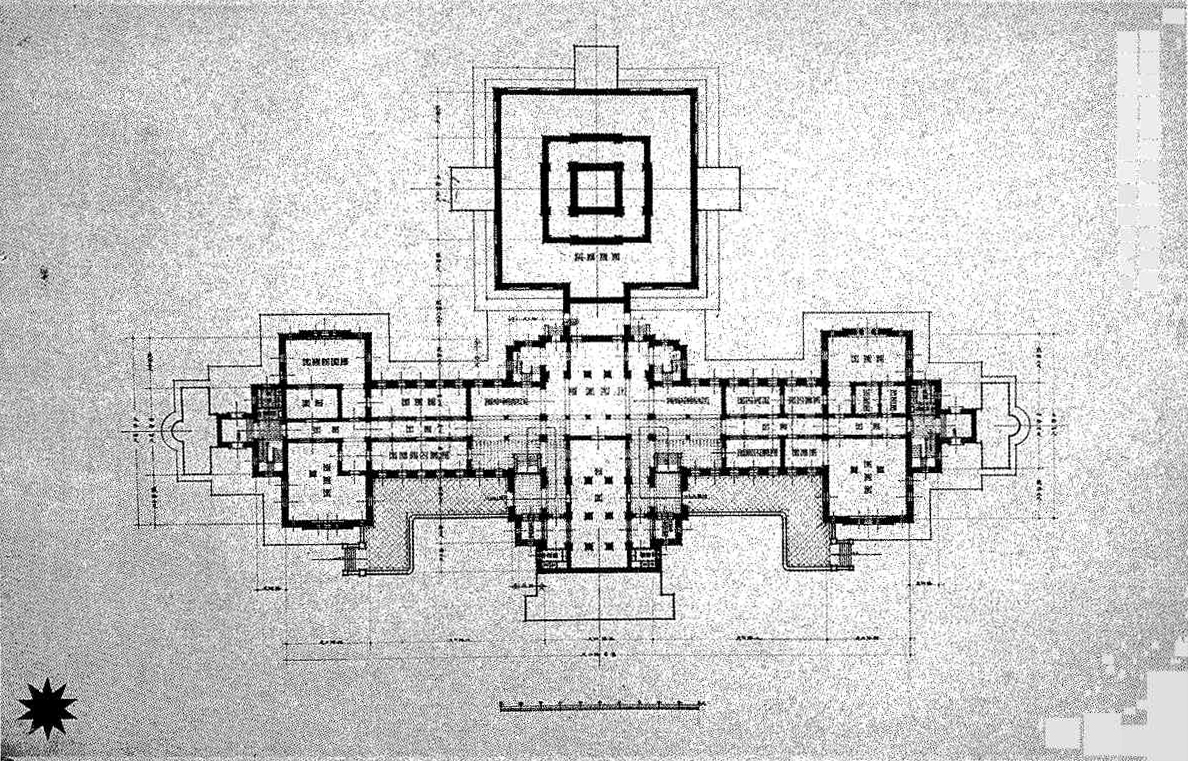
Ground floor plan

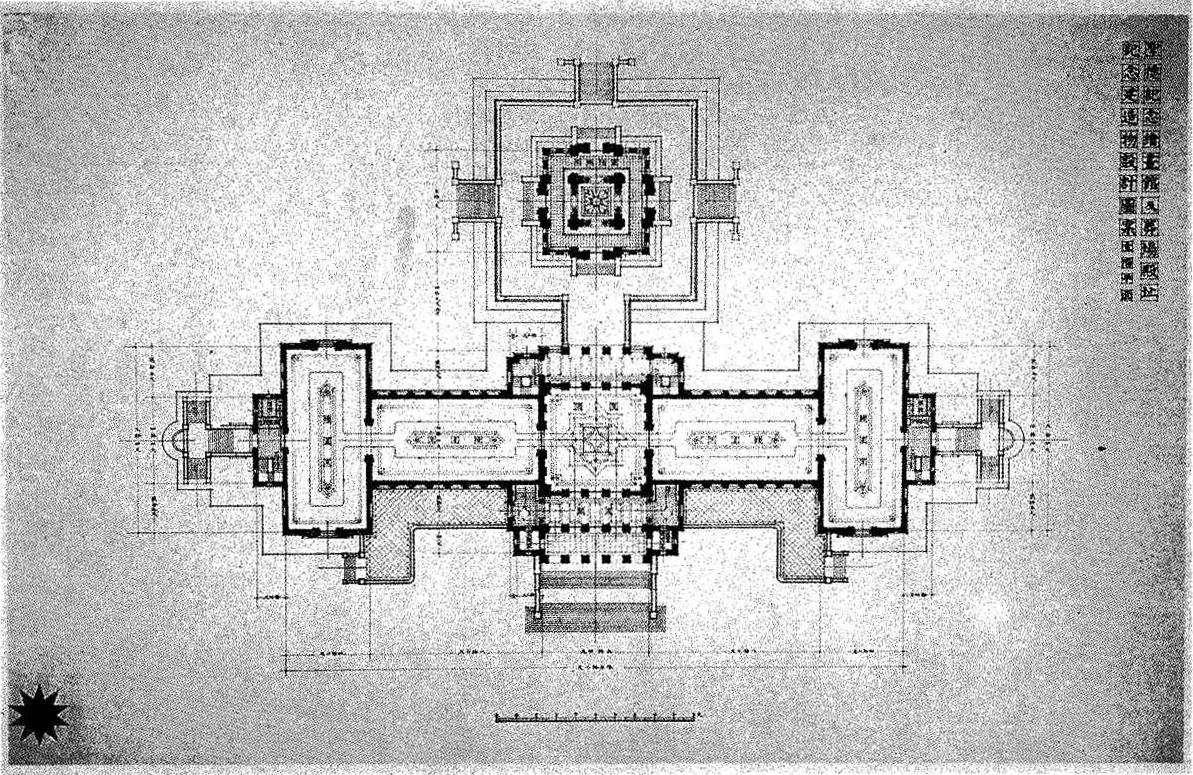
Basement plan

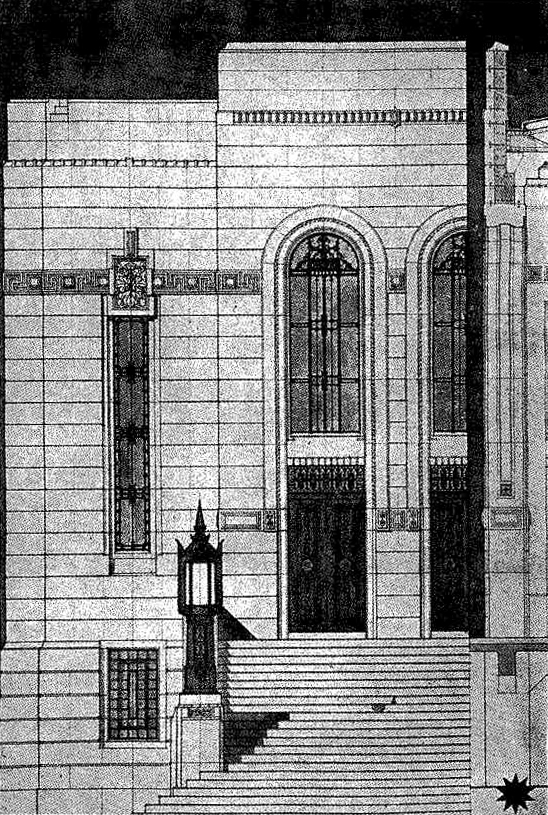
Detail of ornamentation

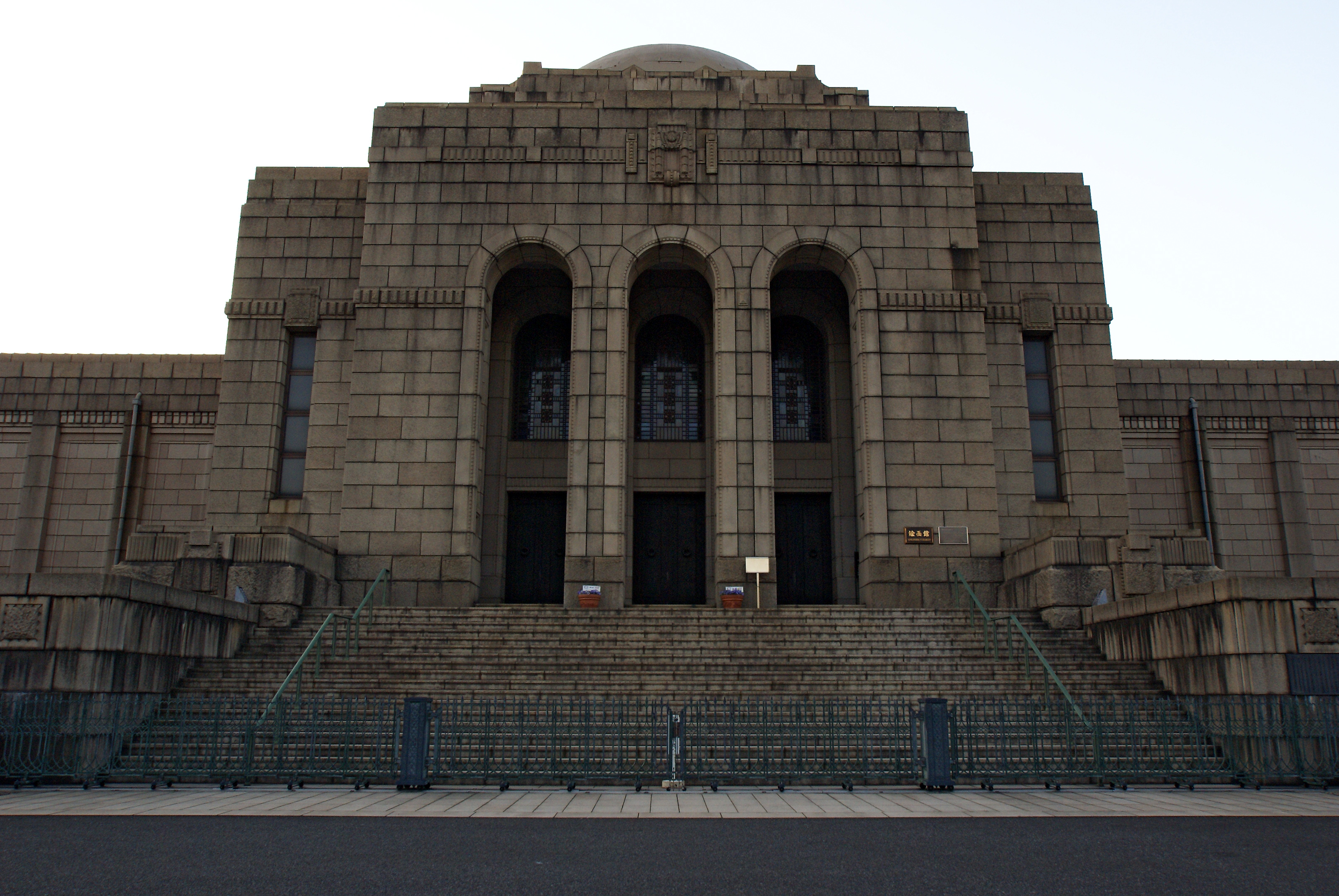
2007 image of the central entrance as realized, showing rustication of the lower courses, dentilation, glyphs, engaged pilasters in the wings, and stained glass windows

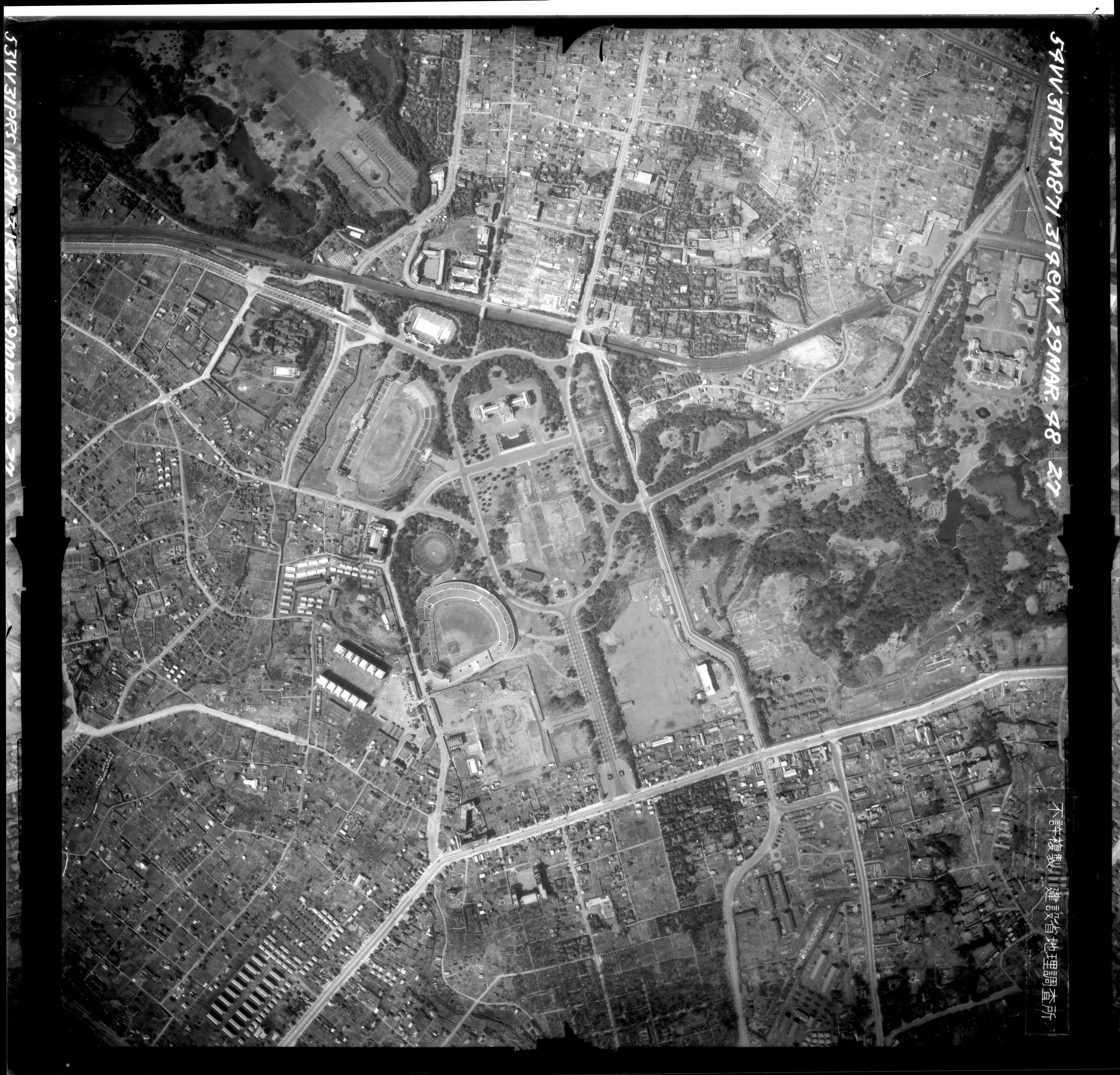
1948 aerial photograph of Meiji Jingū Gaien and its environs, with the Gallery just above the centre, and the ginkgo avenue

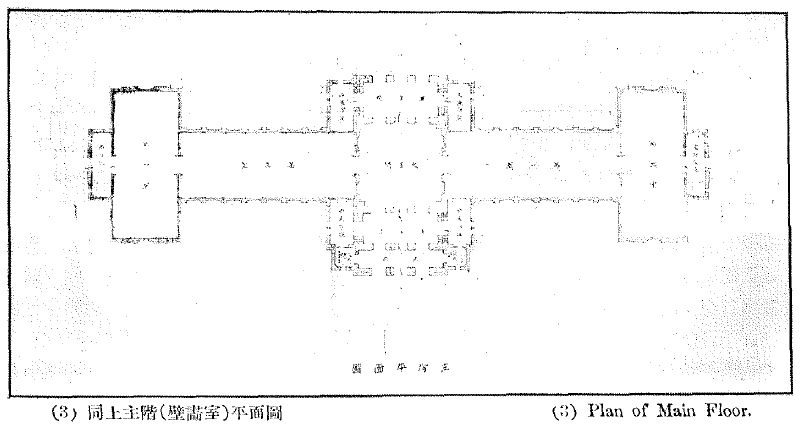
Plan of main floor, as realized (this and the following eleven images are from the December 1926 issue of The Koji Gaho, a former journal of the Japan Society of Civil Engineers)

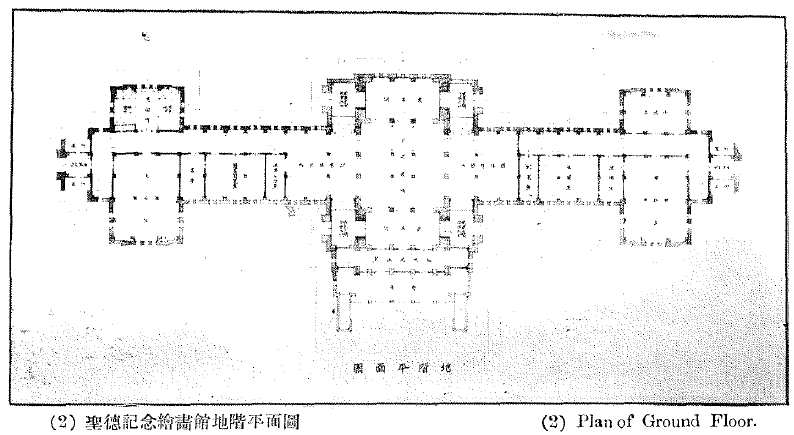
Plan of the lower floor, as realized

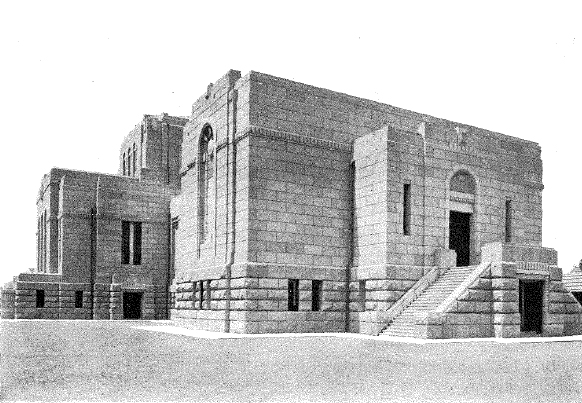
Side view, showing clearly the rustication of the lower courses

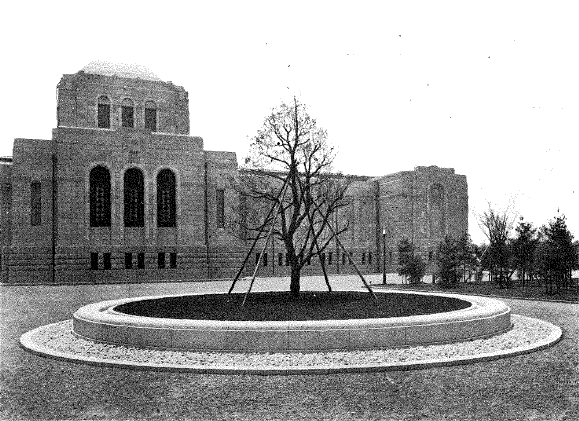
Rear view, with a memorial tree in place of the structure proposed

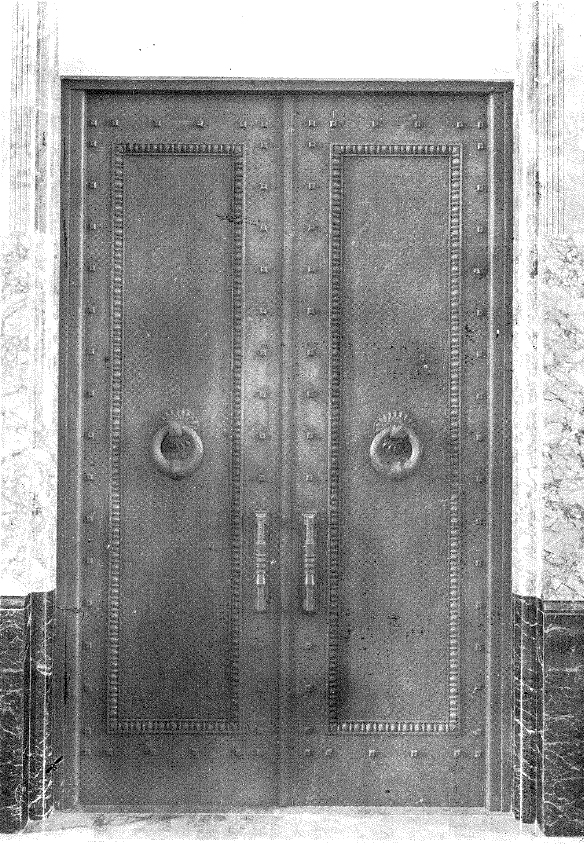
Front entrance, with bronze doors

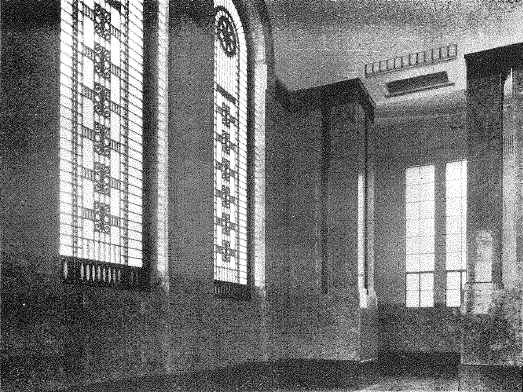
Stained glass windows, near the entrance

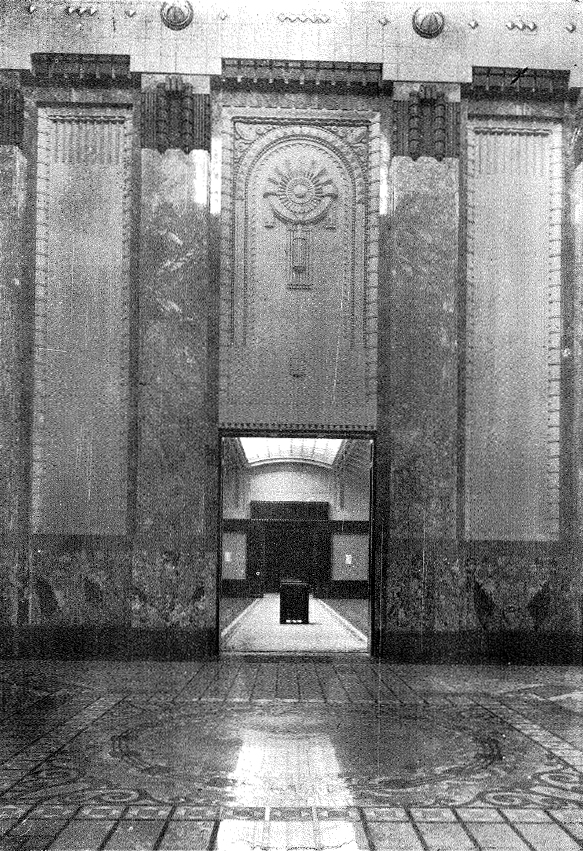
Central hall, with marble cladding and a marble and mosaic tile floor

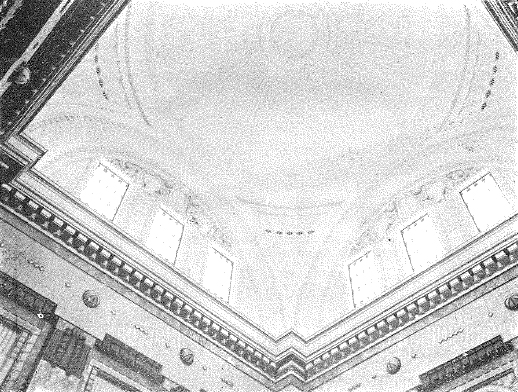
View of the dome, above the central hall

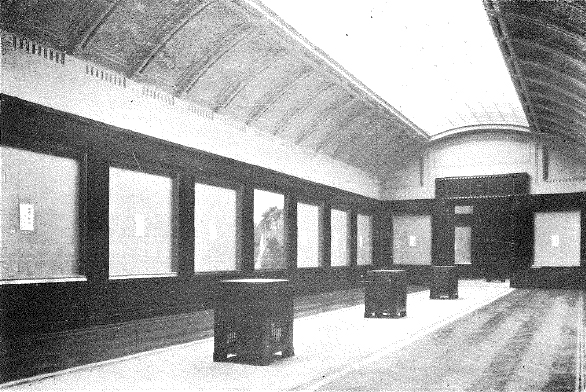
Gallery view

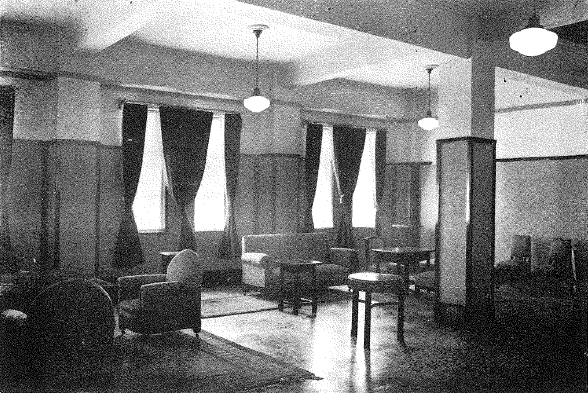
The rest room

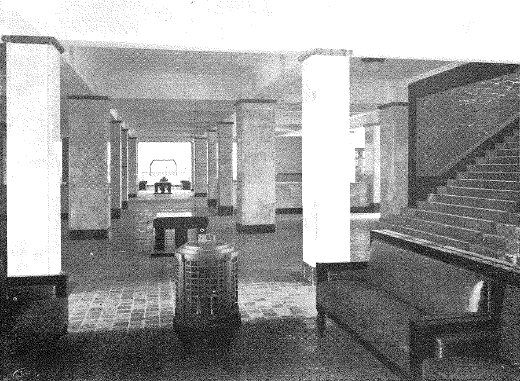
The lower rest room

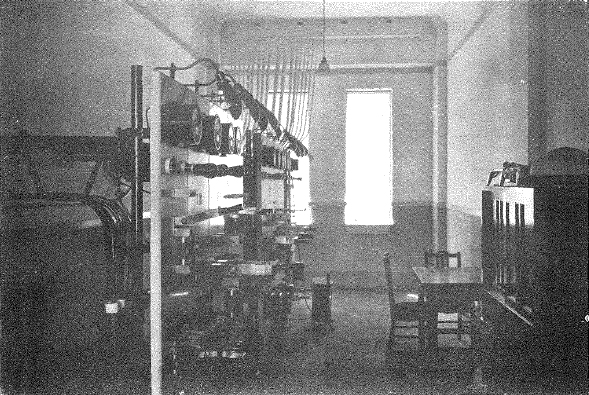
The "Switching Room"

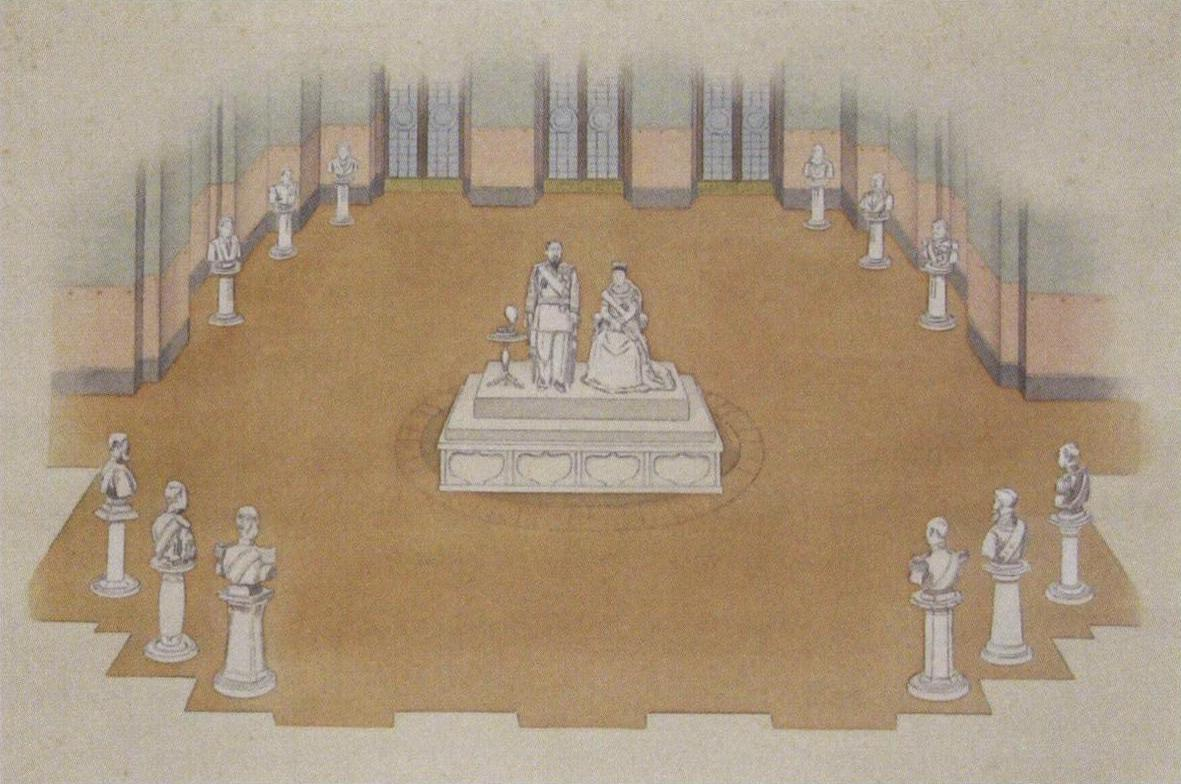
Unimplemented 1935 proposal for the central hall, by Itō Kōun, artist of painting #08

== See also ==
- Historiographical Institute of the University of Tokyo
- List of Important Cultural Properties of Japan (Taishō period: structures)
- List of museums in Tokyo
- Meiji no Mori Minō Quasi-National Park
- Meiji no Mori Takao Quasi-National Park
