= Tetsuya Noguchi =

Japanese contemporary artist

- 野口哲哉
- Born: 1980 (age 45–46); Takamatsu, Kagawa Prefecture, Japan
- Education: Hiroshima City University
- Awards: Kagawa Prefecture Arts and Culture Rookie of the Year Award; 2016
- Website: Official site

Tetsuya Noguchi (野口哲哉, Noguchi Tetsuya; born 1980 in Takamatsu, Kagawa Prefecture, Japan) is a Japanese artist known for his images of samurai in modern everyday or comical situations.

== Biography ==
Noguchi was born in 1980 in Takamatsu, Kagawa Prefecture, Japan. He graduated from Hiroshima City University in 2003 specializing in oil painting, going on to complete graduate school there in 2005.

Since his youth, Noguchi has been inspired by science fiction, samurai films, history, and plastic models, and he uses these as influences in his paintings and sculptures. He was first inspired by a photo of a samurai taken around the end of the Tokugawa period, as well as by the works of Kobori Tomoto. His works have appeared in over 15 solo exhibits since his first in 2008. Two books featuring his works were published in 2014.

== Exhibits ==
Solo

- "Noguchi Tetsuya Exhibit" (Tokyo Contemporary Art Fair (TCAF), 2008)
- "Positive Contact" (Matsuzakaya Art Museum, Matsuzakaya Nagoya Branch, 2011)
- "Noguchi Tetsuya Exhibit" (Gallery Tamae, 2011)
- "Noguchi Tetsuya Exhibit: Noguchi Tetsuya's Warrior Identification Guide" (Nerima Ward Art Museum, 2014)
- "Noguchi Tetsuya Exhibit: Noguchi Tetsuya's Warrior Identification Guide" (Asahi Beer Oyamazaki Villa Art Museum, 2014)
- "The Historical Odyssey" (Haneda Airport International Terminal, 2015)
- "Sleep Away" (Art Fair Tokyo, 2015)
- "Noguchi Tetsya's Works: Journey to Another World" (Gallery Tamae, 2015)
- "Human Silhouette" (Art Fair Tokyo, 2016)
- "Antique Human" (Gallery Tamae, 2016)
- "Drawing Exhibit: Armor and Pencil" (Gallery Tamae, 2017)
- Works Exhibit: Armored Neighbor: Armor-clad Neighbors" (Gallery Tamae, 2017)
- "Putting Love Over Medieval Times" (Pola Museum Annex, 2018)
- "Within Armor: Toyama Version" (Mori Shusui Museum of Art, 2019)
- "This Is Not a Samurai" (Arsham Fieg Gallery, New York, 2019)
- "This Is Not a Samurai" (Takamatsu Art Museum / Gunma Museum of Art / Kariya City Art Museum / Yamaguchi Prefectural Art Museum, 2021)

== Bibliography ==
- From Medieval with Love (野口哲哉作品集 ~中世より愛をこめて~, Noguchi Tetsuya Sakuhinshū: Chūsei Yori Ai o Komete) (February 2014, Kyūryūdō, ISBN 9784763018182)
- Where the Samurai Are (野口哲哉ノ作品集 「侍達ノ居ル処。」, Noguchi Tetsuya no Sakuhinshuu "Samurai-tachi no Iru Tokoro") (February 2014, Seigensha, ISBN 9784861524295)

== Reception ==
Noguchi's work has been described as "archival, historical and yet happily contemporarily comical", and having "technique...so exquisite that it elevates the work entirely out of the realm of parody". His works are sometimes mistaken as being actual historical works due to their detail and style.

== Awards and recognition ==
Noguchi has received the following awards and recognition:

Year	Organization	Award title, Category	Work	Result	Refs
2016	Kagawa Prefecture	Arts and Culture Rookie of the Year Award (文化芸術新人賞受賞)	-	Won	
