= Masatsugu Kobayashi =

Japanese architect

- 小林 正紹
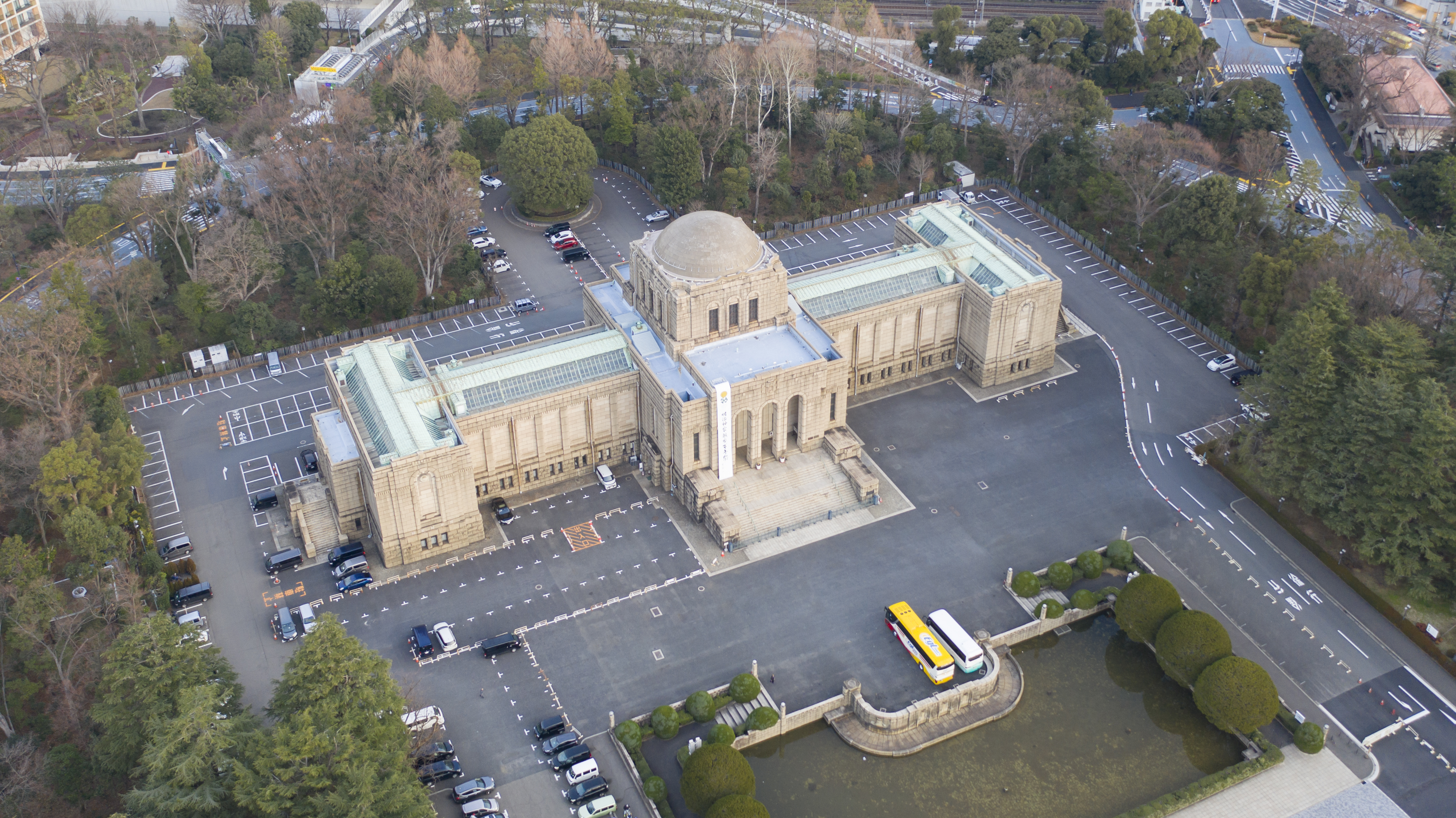
- Meiji Memorial Picture Gallery (c.1926)
- Born: Sado, Niigata Prefecture, Japan
- Occupation: Architect

Masatsugu Kobayashi (小林 正紹, Kobayashi Masatsugu, 1890 - 1980) was a Japanese architect who predominantly designed government buildings. His most notable works are the Meiji Memorial Picture Gallery and the Hori Shoten building in Tokyo.

== Biography ==
Kobayashi was born in Kioi-cho, Tatemachi-ku, Tokyo. He graduated from the Department of Architecture, Kode School (now Kogakuin University ) in 1909. Kobayashi first worked at the Ministry of Finance building department while attending school. After that, he was an architect at the Interior Ministry and the Ministry of Education, dedicating most of his life to official government buildings. As side projects, in addition to the Hori Shoten commercial building, he also designed residences for Reika Wakatsuki and Enji Bunko.

The Meiji Memorial Picture Gallery was completed on 22 October 1926. Kobayashi's design was chosen from 156 entries in a public design competition held in 1918. His original drawing was modified by Meijijingu Zoeikyoku (building department).

== Selected works ==
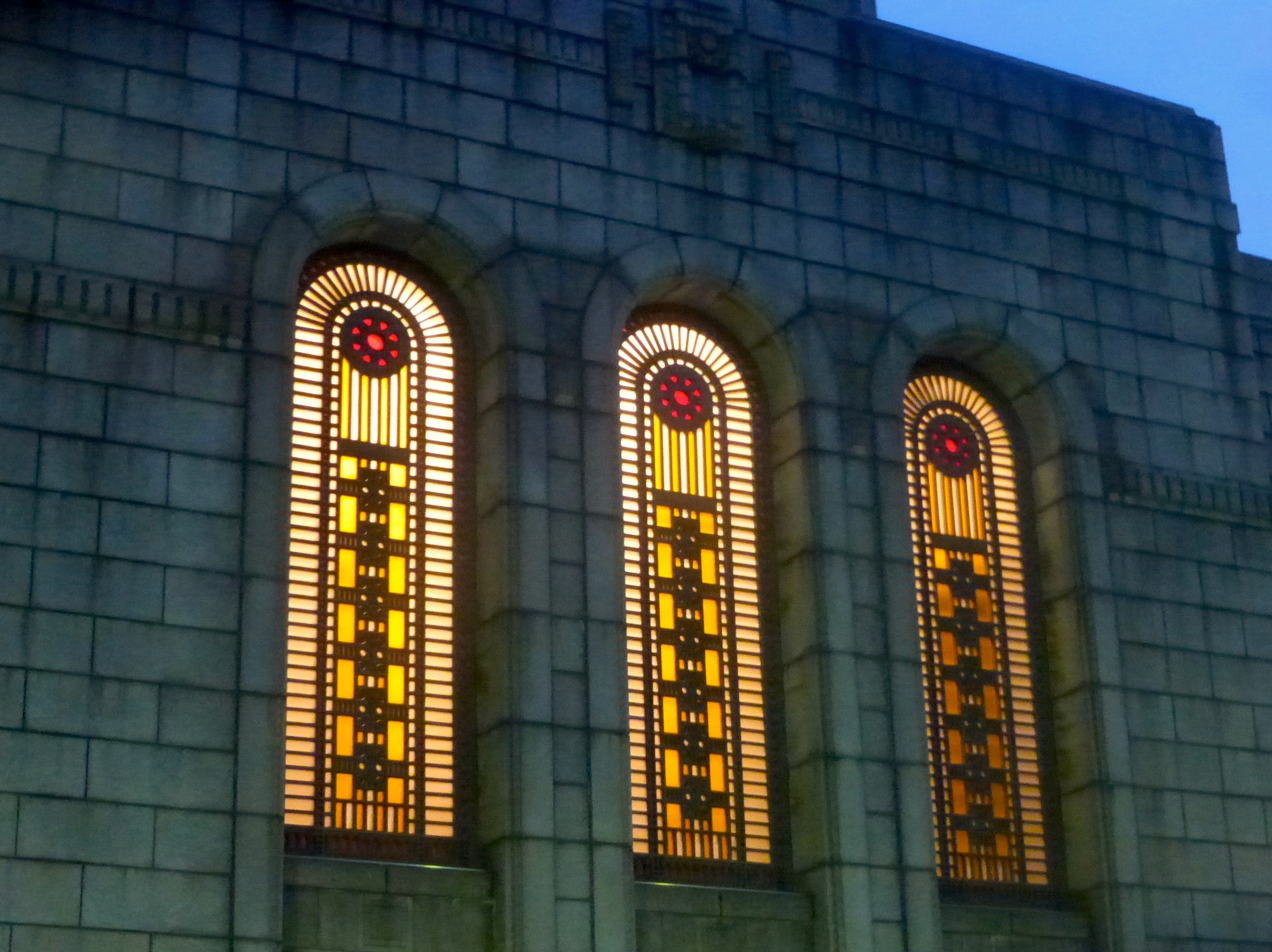
Meiji Memorial Picture Gallery, detail: stained glass windows

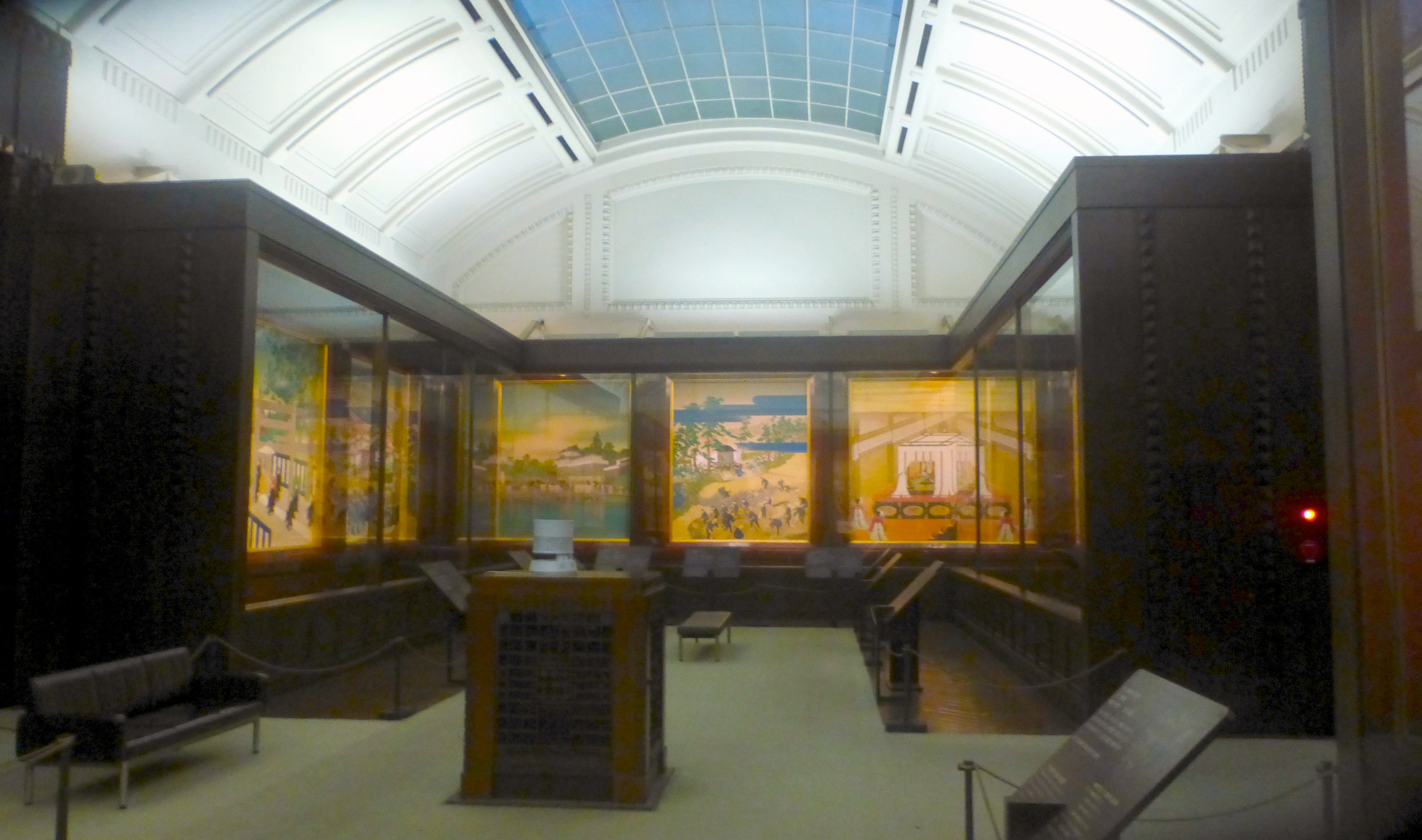
Meiji Memorial Picture Gallery, detail: interior

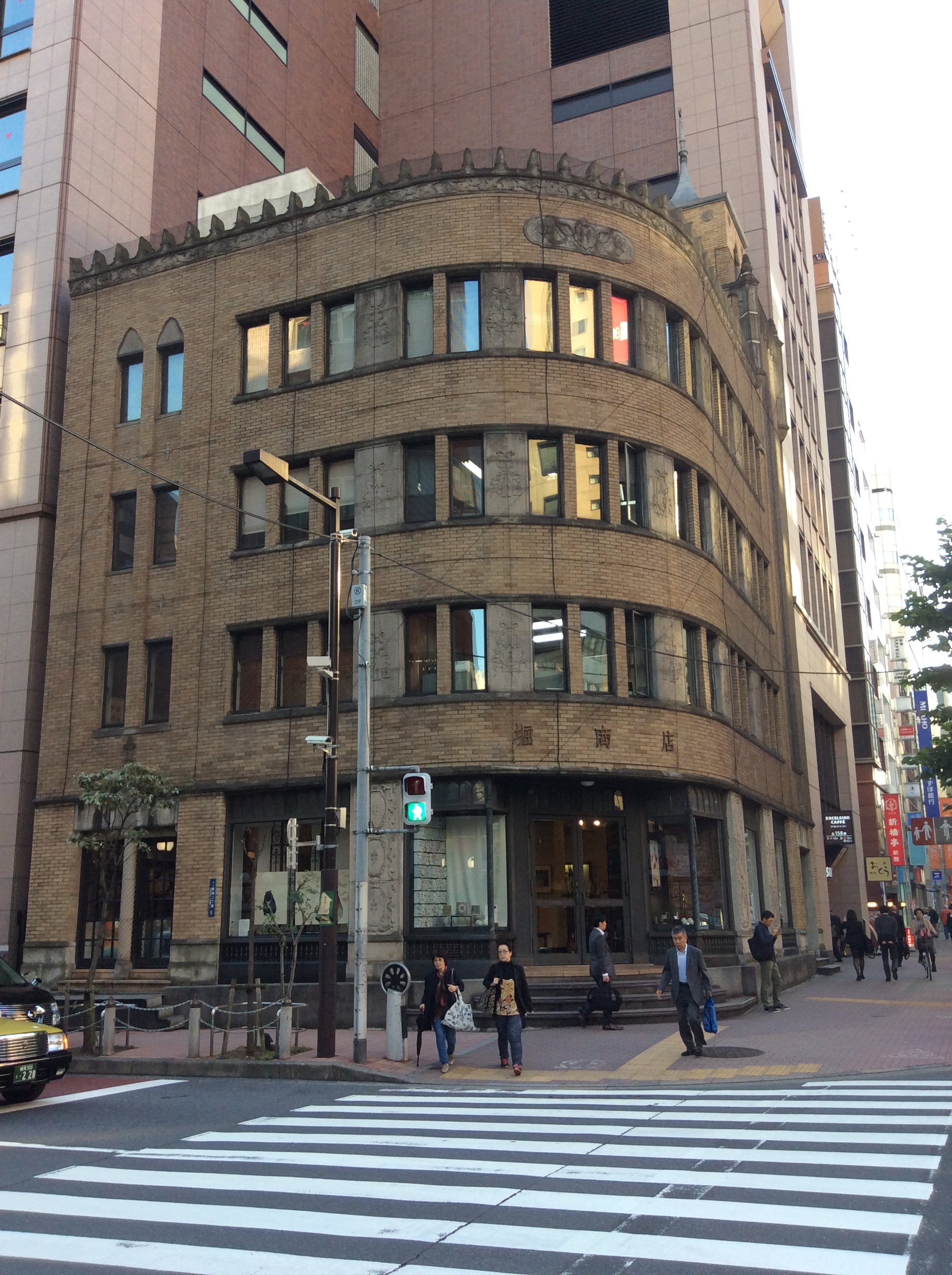
The Hori Shoten building.

- Sesesshon-shiki Tantei Kurabu (セセッション式端艇倶楽部) (1911), Exhibited at 2nd Tokyo Kangyo business exhibition
- Kinen Funsui (記念噴水) (1912), Exhibited at the 3rd Tokyo Manga Exhibition
- Tōkyō Taishō Hakurankai Daihō Zaimokushō Chinretsujō (東京大正博覧会大賓材木商陳列場) (1914), in Ueno, Tokyo
- Kokkaigi Jidō Keikakuan (国会議事堂計画案) (1918)
  - The proposal submitted to the design competition (1918) in the name of Toshio Kobo, who is the younger brother, passes through the primary examination, but has become a problem within the Ministry of Finance and has declined. After that, he was said to be involved in the design of the National Assembly building and in charge of the internal design with Toru Yoshitake.
- Blueprints for the Meiji Memorial Picture Gallery (1918)
  - The Meiji (Seitoku) Memorial Picture Gallery plan draft: 1st prize winner in the design competition (1918). Implementation design of the Meiji Shrine erecting stations Masakazu Kobayashi, Takahashi SadaTaro (1926 completion, Shinjuku-ku, Tokyo Meiji Jingu Outer Gardens).
- Privy Council of Japan building (now the Imperial Palace Guard Headquarters) (1922, Tokyo)
- Hokkaidō Takushoku Ginkō Otaru Shiten (北海道拓殖銀行小樽支店) (now the Otaru Hotel) (1923, Otaru, co-designed with Kenkichi Yabashi)
- Hori Shōten (堀商店) (1932, Shinbashi)
  - Registered tangible cultural property of the country. Collaborative design with his brother Toho Kobo.
- Wakatsuki Reijirō House
- Uemura Kōjirō (植村甲子郎) House
- Fumiko Enchi Mansion
- Komuro Suiun House
- Yamauchi Tokuryū (山内得立) House
- Shachū-shiki Kumitate Jūtaku (斜柱式組立住宅, lit. "house assembled from diagonal poles") (1946, Tokyo)
