= Kampō Arai =

Japanese painter

Kampō Arai (荒井 寛方, August 15, 1878 – April 16, 1945) was a Japanese Buddhist painter and reproduction artist. His given name was Kanjūrō (寛十郎).

== Biography ==
He was born in Ujiie (modern-day Sakura) in Tochigi Prefecture to a family of printers who worked with mon and paper lanterns. In 1899, he started an apprenticeship under ukiyoe-style popular artist Toshikata Mizono. In 1902, he began work in reproduction of old paintings featured in Kokka magazine. In 1907, he was accepted into the first Nihon Bijutsu Tenrankai, in which he later became an active participant.

In 1914, he worked with Yokoyama Taikan and others on the revival of the Japan Fine Arts Academy. In 1916, he traveled to India, where he became acquainted with the poet Rabindranath Tagore. In 1917, he began a project on reproduction of the Ajanta cave paintings. He returned to Japan the following year. In 1939, he participated in a reproduction project on the murals in the Kondō of Hōryū-ji.

In 1945, he died of a stroke during a reproduction project.

== Selected works ==
- Amitabha (阿弥陀 amida), three panels (1913; Tochigi Prefectural Museum of Fine Arts)
- Offering of Milk Pudding (乳糜供養 nyūbi kuyō), six-panel screen (1915, Tokyo National Museum)
- Dragon and Tiger (龍虎図, ryūkozu), two panels (1931, Tochigi Prefectural Museum of Fine Arts)
- Xianzang and Taizong (玄奘と太宗, genjō to taisō), four panels (1927, Tochigi Prefectural Museum of Fine Arts)
