= Kobori Tomoto =

Japanese artist (1864–1931)

- 小堀鞆音
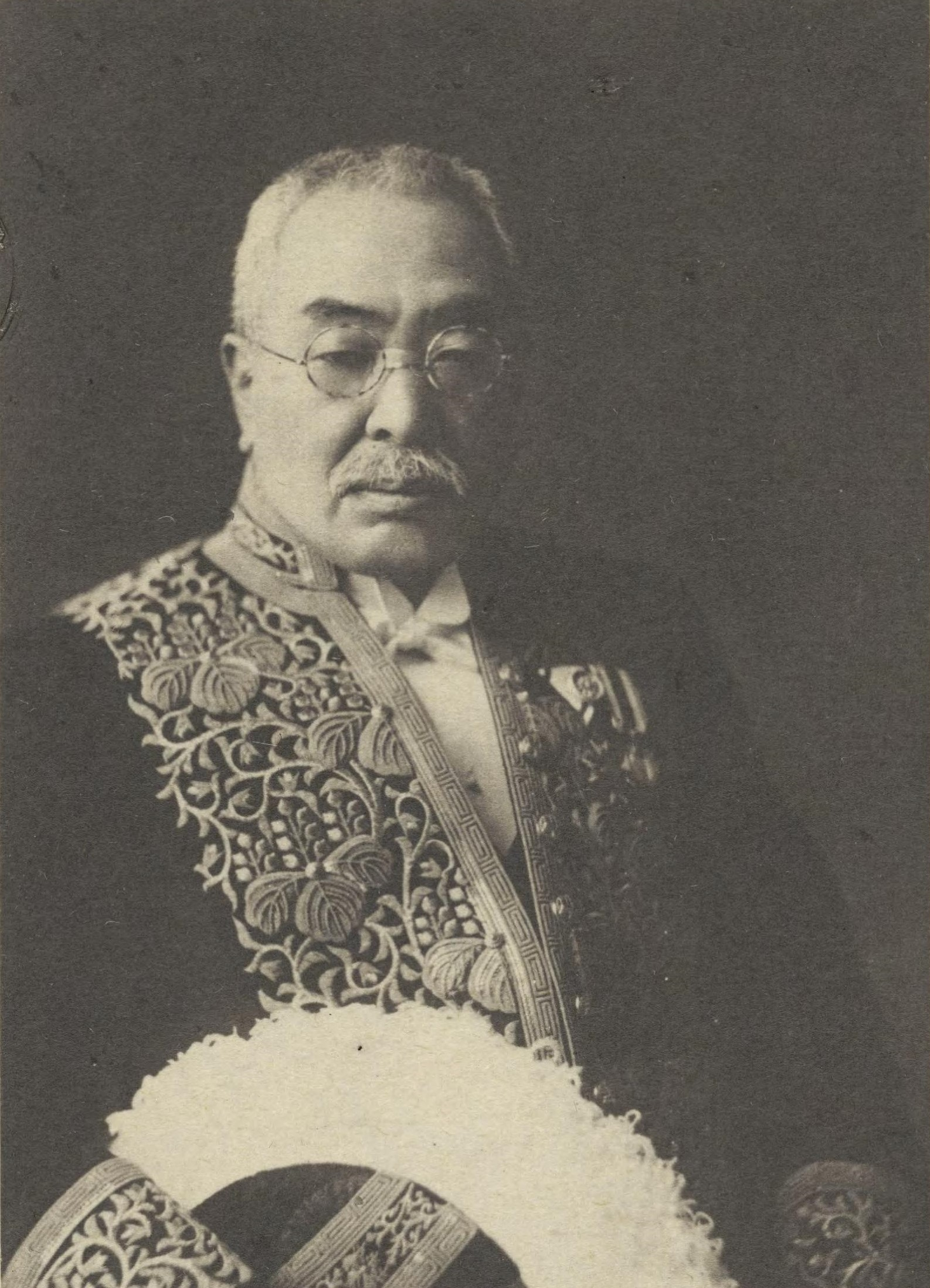
- Born: March 26, 1864; Konaka, Hatagawa Village, Aso District, Shimotsuke Province, Japan
- Died: 1 October 1931 (aged 67)

Kobori Tomoto (小堀鞆音; 26 March 1864 – 1 October 1931) was a Japanese artist. He was an Imperial Household Artist from 1917 until his death in 1931.

== Biography ==
Kobori was born on 26 March 1864 in Konaka, Hatagawa Village, Aso District, Shimotsuke Province (now part of Sano, in Tochigi Prefecture) in the Empire of Japan.

He was appointed as an Imperial Household Artist on 17 June 1917, a position which he held until his death.

He died on 1 October 1931.

== Bibliography and works about him ==
- Kobori Tomoto 80th Death Anniversary Exhibit (小堀鞆音没後80年展, Kobori Tomoto Botsugo 80 Nenten) (October 2019, Yoshizawa Memorial Museum of Art, 80 pages, no ISBN)

== Reception and legacy ==
Kobori was named as an influence by artist Tetsuya Noguchi.
