= Japanese Association of Medical Sciences =

The Japanese Association of Medical Sciences (Japanese: 日本医学会, Hepburn: Nihon Igakkai) is a suborganization of the Japan Medical Association (日本医師会) devoted to the development and promotion of science and research in medicine. The Japanese Association of Medical Sciences was founded independently of the Japan Medical Association in 1902 as a collaboration between 16 medical societies in Japan. Since their founding, they have held a general assembly called the Japan Medical Congress every four years except in 1947 when it was postponed for a year due to the Second World War. In 1948, they held their twelfth assembly at which point they merged with the Japan Medical Association, which has remained their parent organization since. Rather than individuals, the Japanese Association of Medical Sciences has member societies. As of 2019, they have 132 member societies.

== Member Societies ==
1. Japanese Society for the History of Medicine (日本医史学会)
2. Japanese Association of Anatomists (JAA) (日本解剖学会)
3. The Physiology Society of Japan (日本生理学会)
4. The Japanese Biochemical Society (JBS) (日本生化学会)
5. The Japanese Pharmacological Society (日本薬理学会)
6. The Japanese Society of Pathology (日本病理学会)
7. The Japanese Cancer Association (日本癌学会)
8. The Japanese Society of Hematology (日本血液学会)
9. Japanese Society for Bacteriology (日本細菌学会)
10. The Japanese Society of Parasitology (日本寄生虫学会)
11. Japanese Society of Legal Medicine (日本法医学会)
12. Japanese Society for Hygiene (日本衛生学会)
13. The Japanese Society of Health and Human Ecology (日本健康学会)
14. Japan Society of Nutrition and Food Science (日本栄養・食糧学会)
15. The Japanese Society of Balneology, Climatology and Physical Medicine (日本温泉気候物理医学会)
16. The Japan Endocrine Society (日本内分泌学会)
17. The Japanese Society of Internal Medicine (JSIM) (日本内科学会)
18. Japan Pediatric Society (日本小児科学会)
19. The Japanese Association for Infectious Diseases (日本感染症学会)
20. The Japanese Society for Tuberculosis (日本結核病学会)
21. The Japanese Society of Gastroenterology (JSGE) (日本消化器病学会)
22. The Japanese Circulation Society (JPN CIRC SOC) (日本循環器学会)
23. The Japanese Society of Psychiatry and Neurology (JSPN) (日本精神神経学会)
24. Japan Surgical Society (JSS) (日本外科学会)
25. The Japanese Orthopaedic Association (JOA) (日本整形外科学会)
26. Japan Society of Obstetrics and Gynecology (JSOG) (日本産科婦人科学会)
27. Japanese Ophthalmological Society (JOS) (日本眼科学会)
28. The Oto-rhino-laryngological Society of Japan, Inc. (日本耳鼻咽喉科学会)
29. The Japanese Dermatological Association (日本皮膚科学会)
30. The Japanese Urological Association (日本泌尿器科学会)
31. Japanese Stomatological Society (JSS) (日本口腔科学会)
32. Japan Radiological Society (JRS) (日本医学放射線学会)
33. The Association of Insurance Medicine of Japan (日本保険医学会)
34. Japanese Society of Medical Instrumentation (JSMI) (日本医療機器学会)
35. Japanese Leprosy Association (日本ハンセン病学会)
36. Japanese Society of Public Health (JSPH) (日本公衆衛生学会)
37. The Japan Society of Medical Entomology and Zoology (日本衛生動物学会)
38. Japanese Association of Transportation Medicine (日本交通医学会)
39. The Japanese Society of Physical Fitness and Sports Medicine (日本体力医学会)
40. Japan Society for Occupational Health (日本産業衛生学会)
41. The Japan Broncho-Esophagological Society (JBES) (日本気管食道科学会)
42. Japanese Society of Allergology (日本アレルギー学会)
43. Japanese Society of Chemotherapy (日本化学療法学会)
44. The Japanese Society for Virology (日本ウイルス学会)
45. Japanese Society of Anesthesiologists (JSA) (日本麻酔科学会)
46. The Japanese Association for Thoracic Surgery (JATS) (日本胸部外科学会)
47. The Japan Neurosurgical Society (JNS) (日本脳神経外科学会)
48. The Japan Society of Transfusion Medicine and Cell Therapy (日本輸血・細胞治療学会)
49. The Japanese Society for Medical Mycology (JSMM) (日本医真菌学会)
50. The Japanese Association of Rural Medicine (日本農村医学会)
51. The Japan Diabetes Society (JDS) (日本糖尿病学会)
52. The Japanese Association of Correctional Medicine (Kyousei IG) (日本矯正医学会)
53. Japanese Society of Neurology (日本神経学会)
54. The Japan Geriatrics Society (日本老年医学会)
55. The Japan Society of Human Genetics (日本人類遺伝学会)
56. The Japanese Association of Rehabilitation Medicine (日本リハビリテーション医学会)
57. The Japanese Respiratory Society (日本呼吸器学会)
58. Japanese Society of Nephrology (JSN) (日本腎臓学会)
59. Japan College of Rheumatology (JCR) (日本リウマチ学会)
60. Japanese Society for Medical and Biological Engineering (JSMBE) (日本生体医工学会)
61. The Japanese Teratology Society (JTS) (日本先天異常学会)
62. The Japan Society of Hepatology (JSH) (日本肝臓学会)
63. Japan Society of Plastic and Reconstructive Surgery (日本形成外科学会)
64. Japanese Society of Tropical Medicine (日本熱帯医学会)
65. The Japanese Society of Pediatric Surgeons (JSPS) (日本小児外科学会)
66. Japanese College of Angiology (Jap. Coll. Angiol. ) (日本脈管学会)
67. Japan Society of Perinatal and Neonatal Medicine (日本周産期・新生児医学会)
68. The Japanese Society for Artificial Organs (JSAO) (日本人工臓器学会)
69. The Japanese Society for Immunology (JSI) (日本免疫学会)
70. The Japanese Society of Gastroenterological Surgery (日本消化器外科学会)
71. Japanese Society of Laboratory Medicine (JSLM) (日本臨床検査医学会)
72. The Japanese Society of Nuclear Medicine (JSNM) (日本核医学会)
73. Japan Society for Reproductive Medicine (JSRM) (日本生殖医学会)
74. Japanese Association for Acute Medicine (JAAM) (日本救急医学会)
75. Japanese Society of Psychosomatic Medicine (JSPM) (日本心身医学会)
76. Japan Society for Healthcare Administration (JSHA) (日本医療・病院管理学会)
77. Japan Gastroenterological Endoscopy Society (JGES) (日本消化器内視鏡学会)
78. Japan Society of Clinical Oncology (JSCO) (日本癌治療学会)
79. The Japanese Society for Transplantation (日本移植学会)
80. Japanese Society of Occupational Medicine and Traumatology (JSOMT) (日本職業・災害医学会)
81. The Japanese Society for Cardiovascular Surgery (JSCVS) (日本心臓血管外科学会)
82. The Japanese Society for Lymphoreticular Tissue Research (JSLTR) (日本リンパ網内系学会)
83. Japan Society of Neurovegetative Research (日本自律神経学会)
84. The Japan Society of Coloproctology (日本大腸肛門病学会)
85. The Japan Society of Ultrasonics in Medicine (日本超音波医学会)
86. Japan Atherosclerosis Society (日本動脈硬化学会)
87. The Japan Society for Oriental Medicine (日本東洋医学会)
88. The Japanese Society of Child Neurology (日本小児神経学会)
89. The Japanese Association for Chest Surgery (日本呼吸器外科学会)
90. The Japan Society for Medical Education (日本医学教育学会)
91. Japan Association for Medical Informatics (JAMI) (日本医療情報学会)
92. Japan Epidemiological Association (日本疫学会)
93. The Japanese Society of Intensive Care Medicine (日本集中治療医学会)
94. Japan Society of Smooth Muscle Research (日本平滑筋学会)
95. The Japanese Society of Clinical Pharmacology and Therapeutics (日本臨床薬理学会)
96. The Japanese Society of Neuropathology (日本神経病理学会)
97. The Japan Stroke Society (日本脳卒中学会)
98. The Japanese Society of Hypertension (日本高血圧学会)
99. The Japanese Society of Clinical Cytology (日本臨床細胞学会)
100. The Japanese Society for Dialysis Therapy (日本透析医学会)
101. The Japan Society for Endoscopic Surgery (日本内視鏡外科学会)
102. Japanese Breast Cancer Society (日本乳癌学会)
103. Japan Society for the Study of Obesity (日本肥満学会)
104. The Japanese Society on Thrombosis and Hemostasis (日本血栓止血学会)
105. The Japanese Society for Vascular Surgery (日本血管外科学会)
106. Japan Society for Laser Surgery and Medicine (JSLSM) (日本レーザー医学会)
107. Japanese Society of Medical Oncology (JSMO) (日本臨床腫瘍学会)
108. The Japan Society for Respiratory Endoscopy (JSRE) (日本呼吸器内視鏡学会)
109. Japan Primary Care Association (日本プライマリ・ケア連合学会)
110. Japanese Society for Surgery of the Hand (日本手外科学会)
111. The Japanese Society for Spine Surgery and Related Research (日本脊椎脊髄病学会)
112. Japanese Society for Palliative Medicine (JSPM) (日本緩和医療学会)
113. Japanese Society for Radiation Oncology (JASTRO) (日本放射線腫瘍学会)
114. The Japanese Society of Clinical Sports Medicine (JSCSM) (日本臨床スポーツ医学会)
115. Japanese Society for Burn Injuries (日本熱傷学会)
116. Japanese Society of Pediatric Cardiology and Cardiac Surgery (日本小児循環器学会)
117. Japanese Society of Sleep Research (JSSR) (日本睡眠学会)
118. Japanese Society for Magnetic Resonance in Medicine (JSMRM) (日本磁気共鳴医学会)
119. The Japan Lung Cancer Society (日本肺癌学会)
120. Japanese Gastric Cancer Association (日本胃癌学会)
121. The Japan Society for Hematopoietic Cell Transplantation (JSHCT) (日本造血細胞移植学会)
122. Japan Society of Pain Clinicians (JSPC) (日本ペインクリニック学会)
123. Japan Society of Metabolism and Clinical Nutrition (JSMCN) (日本病態栄養学会)
124. Japan Society for Dementia Research (日本認知症学会)
125. Japanese Association for Disaster Medicine (日本集団災害医学会)
126. The Japanese Society of Pediatric Hematology/Oncology (JSPHO) (日本小児血液・がん学会)
127. Japanese Psychogeriatric Society (日本老年精神医学会)
128. Japanese Society for Parenteral and Enteral Nutrition (JSPEN) (日本静脈経腸栄養学会)
129. The Japanese Society for Regenerative Medicine (JSRM) (日本再生医療学会)
130. The Japanese Society for Neuroendovascular Therapy (JSNET) (日本脳神経血管内治療学会)
131. Japan Osteoporosis Society (日本骨粗鬆症学会)
132. Japanese Society for Apheresis (JSFA) (日本アフェレシス学会)

== Japan Medical Congress ==
The following are the years and locations of each of the Japan Medical Congresses:

Meeting	Year	Location
1st	1902	Tokyo
2nd	1906	Tokyo
3rd	1910	Osaka
4th	1914	Tokyo
5th	1918	Tokyo
6th	1922	Kyoto
7th	1926	Tokyo
8th	1930	Osaka
9th	1934	Tokyo
10th	1938	Kyoto
11th	1942	Tokyo
12th	1947	Osaka
13th	1951	Tokyo
14th	1955	Kyoto
15th	1959	Tokyo
16th	1963	Osaka
17th	1967	Nagoya
18th	1971	Tokyo
19th	1975	Kyoto
20th	1979	Tokyo
21st	1983	Osaka
22nd	1987	Tokyo
23rd	1991	Kyoto
24th	1995	Nagoya
25th	1999	Tokyo
26th	2003	Fukuoka
27th	2007	Osaka
28th	2011	Tokyo
29th	2015	Kyoto
30th	2019	Nagoya
