= Reminiscence of the Tempyō Era =

1902 painting by Fujishima Takeji

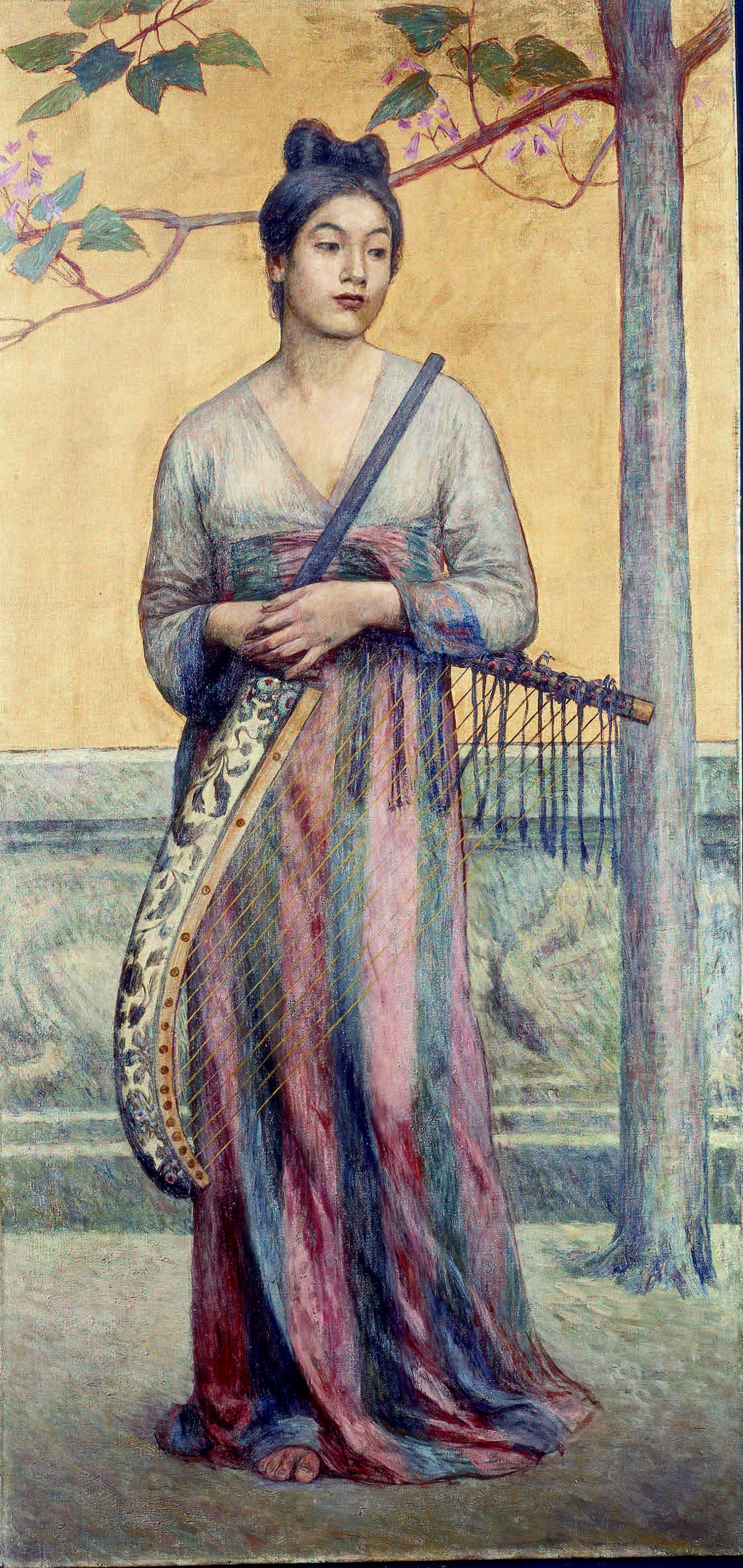
Reminiscence of the Tempyō Era (ICP) (1902), by Fujishima Takeji; oil on canvas; 197.5 centimetres (77.8 in) by 94.0 centimetres (37.0 in)

Reminiscence of the Tempyō Era (天平の面影, Tempyō no omokage) is a 1902 painting by yōga artist Fujishima Takeji (1867–1943). Inspired by nostalgia for the Tempyō era and, like his Butterflies and covers for the literary magazine Myōjō, an influential exemplar of Meiji romanticism, it has been designated an Important Cultural Property. It is part of the collection of the Ishibashi Foundation.

== Description ==
Fujishima Takeji combines Japanese elements, such as the tall vertical format of a hanging scroll, the gold background, and the timeless subject of a sinuous beauty beneath a tree, with a classicizing horizontal band, a low wall with a sculpted frieze in relief, all executed in the western-derived medium of oil upon canvas. Beneath the angled branches of the vertical paulownia, the figure—according to one theory, the Empress Kōmyō herself—stands barefooted, her weight on her right leg. Wearing a high striped skirt, her hair is bound high in a double top-knot, in the manner of noble ladies of the period known as ni-kei (二髻) or sō-kei (双髻). She holds an ornately lacquered sixteen string kugo, modelled on one in the Shōsōin. A contemporary review in the Miyako Shimbun highlights the air of mystery and imagination that accompanies her seemingly calm poise. Art historian Harada Minoru writes of how, in this work, as in Butterflies, the artist "has gone beyond the plein-air style that dominated his early paintings to create his own unique expression through delicacy of line and brushstroke, imaginative composition, and brilliant colour".

== Background ==
In the words of Ernest Fenollosa, "we can know the material side of Tempyo [minutely] through the Shosoin Museum". After the 1878 gift to the Imperial Household of 319 treasures from Hōryū-ji, to be placed at the new precursor to the Tokyo National Museum, and the early Meiji inventories of the Shōsōin, study and appreciation of early Japanese art grew apace, as reflected in the early moves for the preservation of cultural properties that culminated in the 1897 Ancient Temples and Shrines Preservation Law, supplementary provisions to which extended protection to treasures in their charge.

== History ==
Part of the contemporary so-called "Tempyō boom" (「天平ブーム」), the artist's sketchbooks from this period include reworkings of the celebrated painted panels from a byōbu in the Shōsōin depicting a beauty under a tree, as well as of a lacquered kugo from the same repository of treasures; as in the 1895 replica, the original instrument instead features twenty-three strings. Other sketches include figures in long striped skirts, based on the Nara-period Illustrated Sutra of Cause and Effect, and studies of contemporary female hairstyles based on paintings and statues, such as that of the National Treasure Kichijōten at Yakushi-ji.

The painting was first exhibited at the Seventh Hakuba-kai ("White Horse Society") Exhibition, held in September and October 1902 in Ueno Park, in one of the halls from the 1877 inaugural National Industrial Exhibition. There it appeared under the name Reminiscences of the Tempyō Period (天平時代の面影). Subsequently, acquired by the Ishibashi Foundation, it was displayed at the Ishibashi Museum of Art, now the Kurume City Art Museum in Kurume, Fukuoka Prefecture, before being transferred to Tokyo with the 2016 changes to the museum's management and ownership. Stored at the Ishibashi Foundation Art Research Center, it will be periodically displayed at the related Artizon Museum (formerly the Bridgestone Museum of Art).

The painting inspired a poem by Kambara Ariake that opens: "What dost thou search, a thousand years or dust, fair maiden?" It also exerted a strong influence over the romanticist Aoki Shigeru. More recently, the painting, alongside Aoki Shigeru's 1904 A Good Catch or Harvest of the Sea, has provided the inspiration for composer Hirano Ichirō's (平野一郎) nineteen-minute Umi no Sachi / Tempyô no Omokage~Diptych for Soprano & Piano: after Kambara Ariake's Poetry.

== Gallery of related works ==
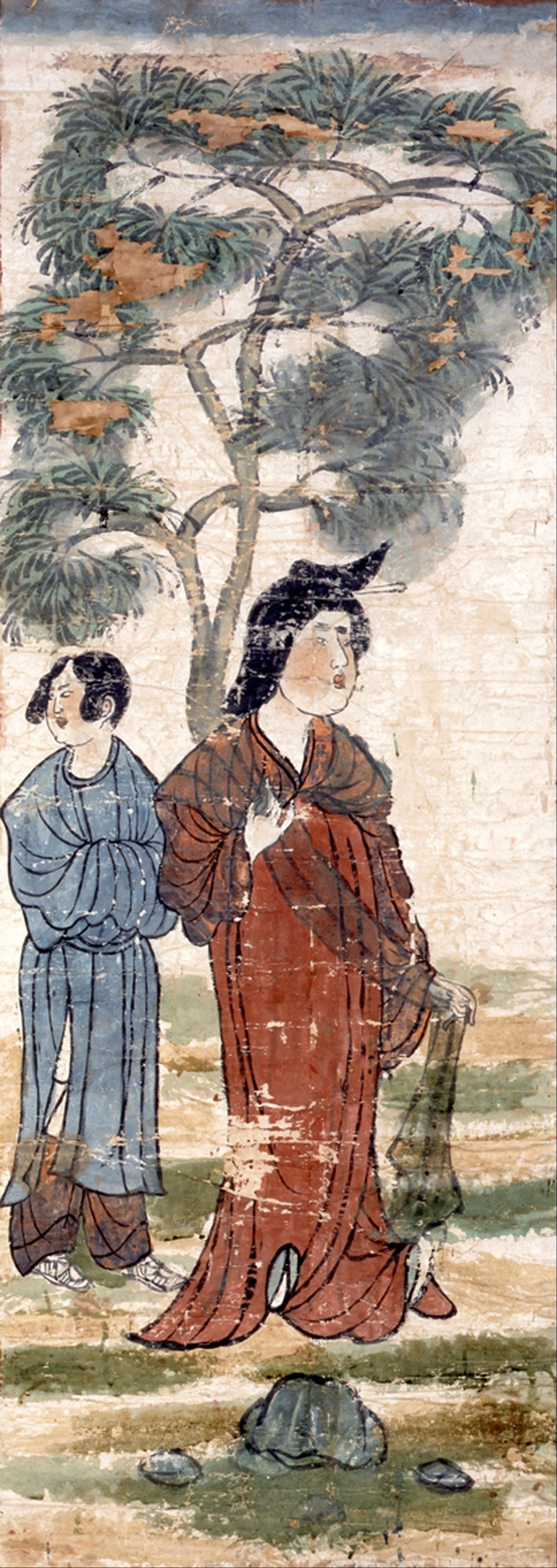
Beauty beneath a Tree (Tang dynasty), said to have been excavated from Turfan (MOA Museum of Art)

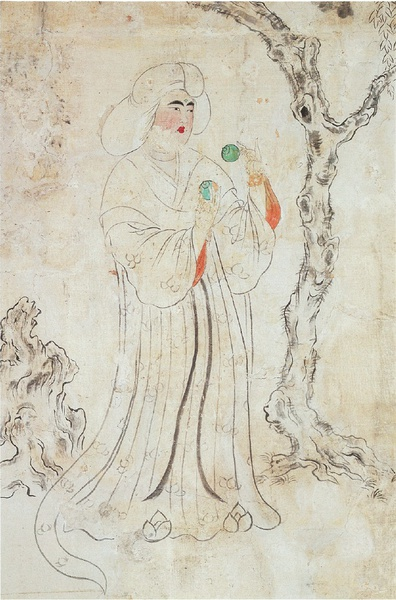
Lady under a Tree, from a byōbu now separated into its six panels, one bearing the date Tenpyō-shōhō 4 (752) (Shōsō-in)

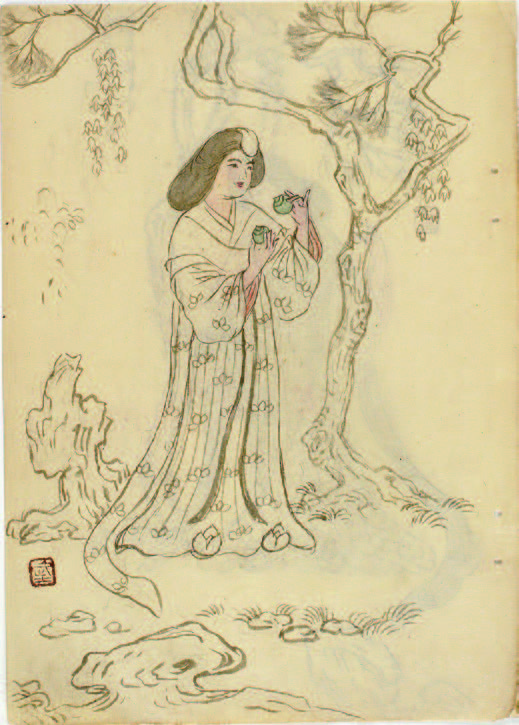
Lady under a Tree from Fujishima Takeji's sketchbooks

Lady under a Tree, from a byōbu now separated into its six panels, one bearing the date Tenpyō-shōhō 4 (752) (Shōsō-in)

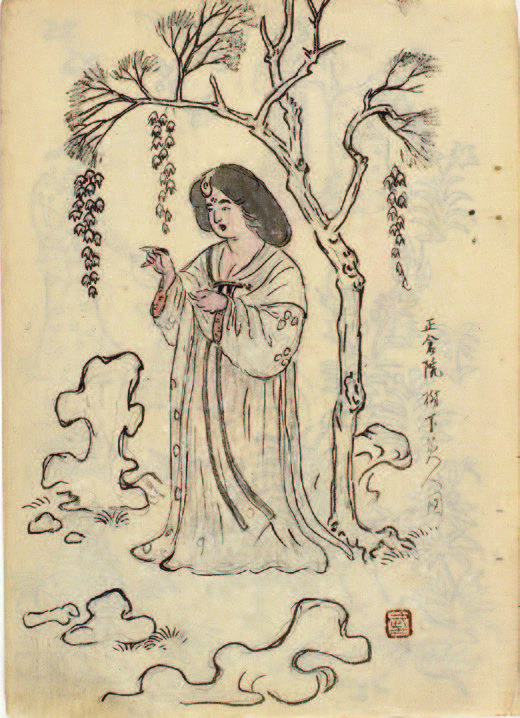
Lady under a Tree from Fujishima Takeji's sketchbooks

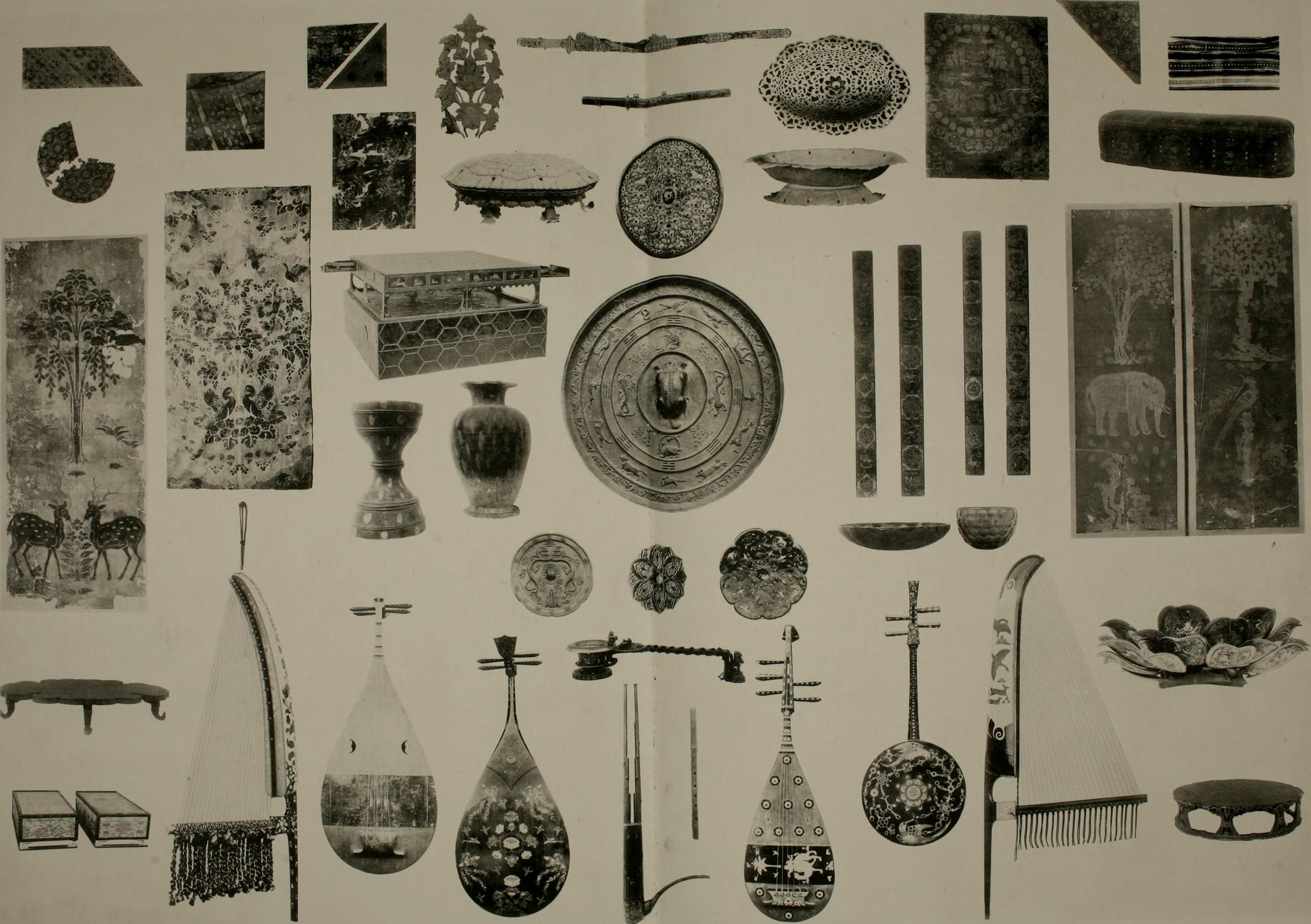
Treasures of the Shōsō-in, including the kugo

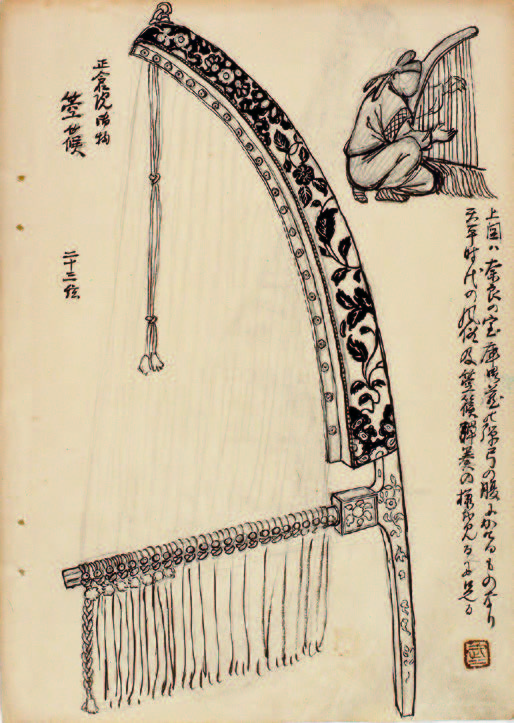
Kugo from Fujishima Takeji's sketchbooks

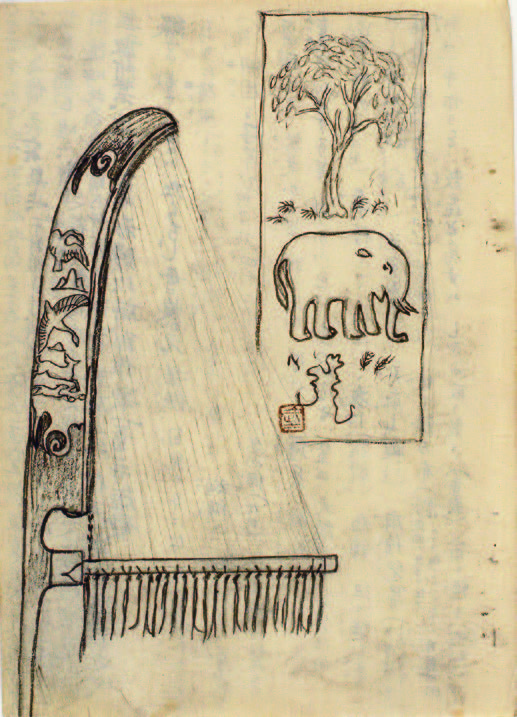
Kugo from Fujishima Takeji's sketchbooks

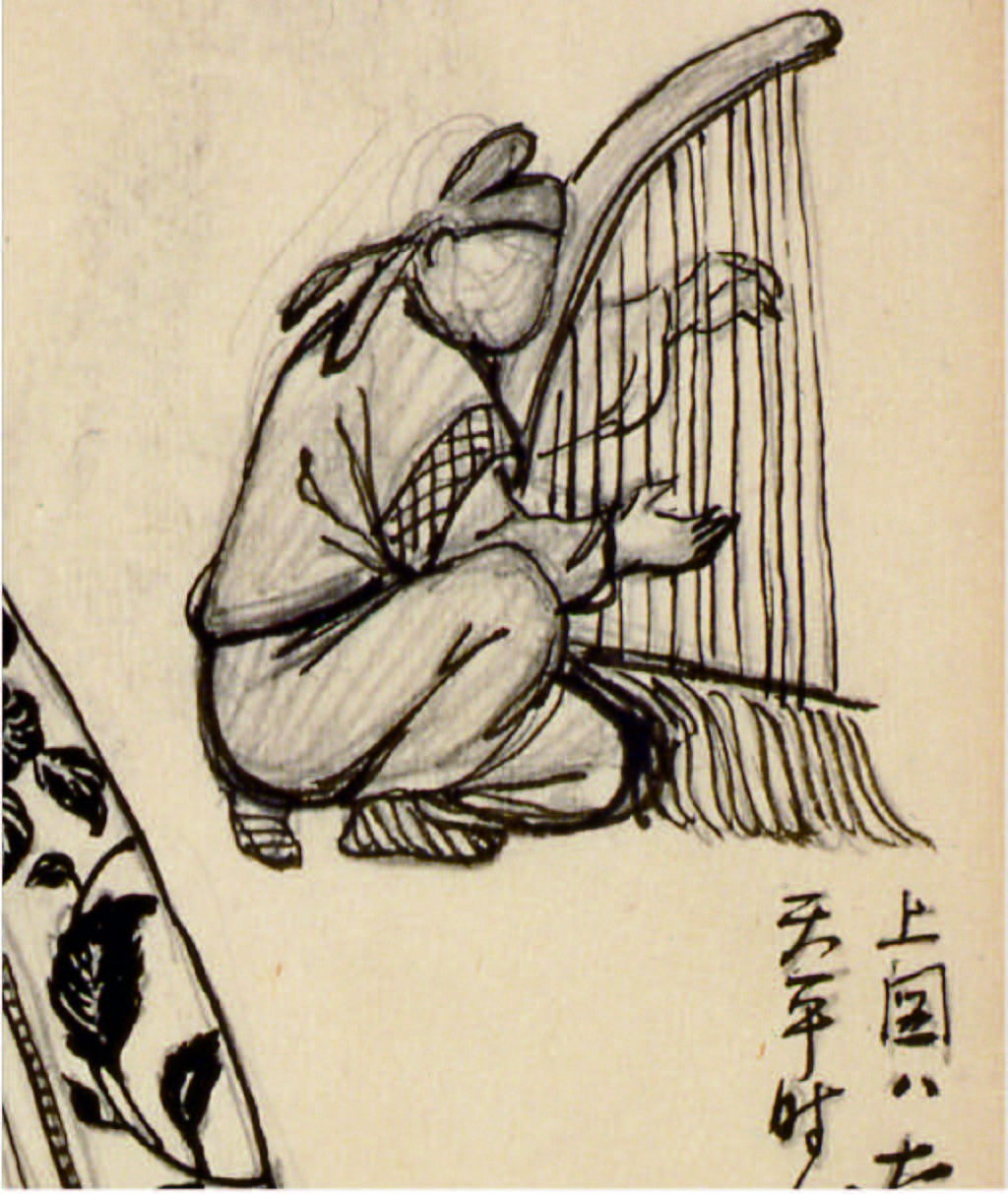
Kugo from Fujishima Takeji's sketchbooks

Kichijōten (NT) (Nara period) (Yakushi-ji)

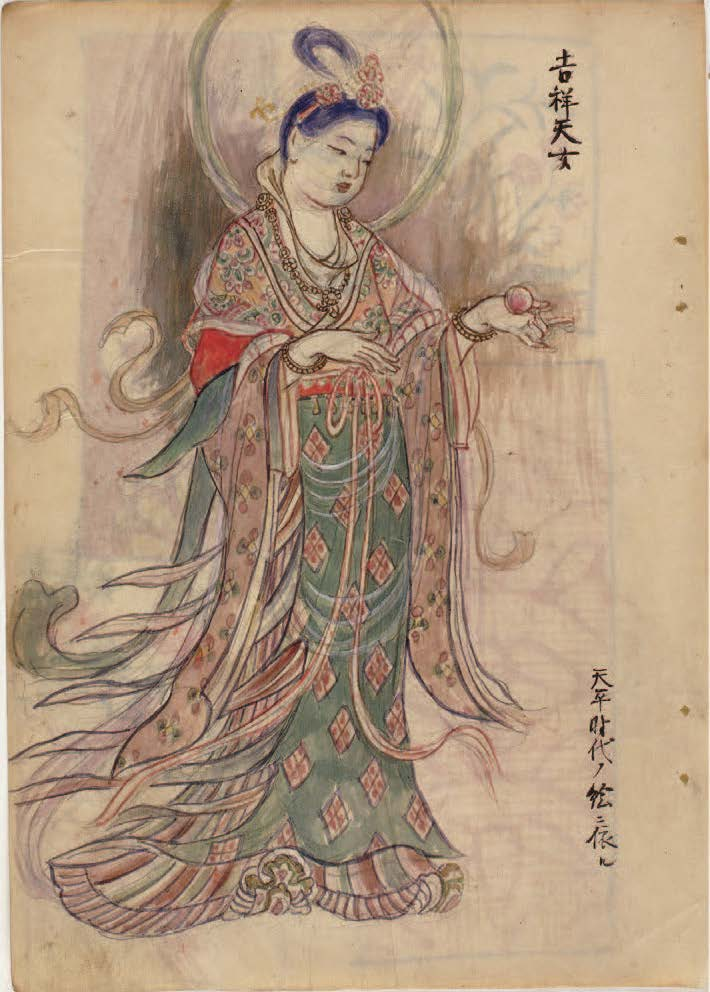
Kichijōten from Fujishima Takeji's sketchbooks

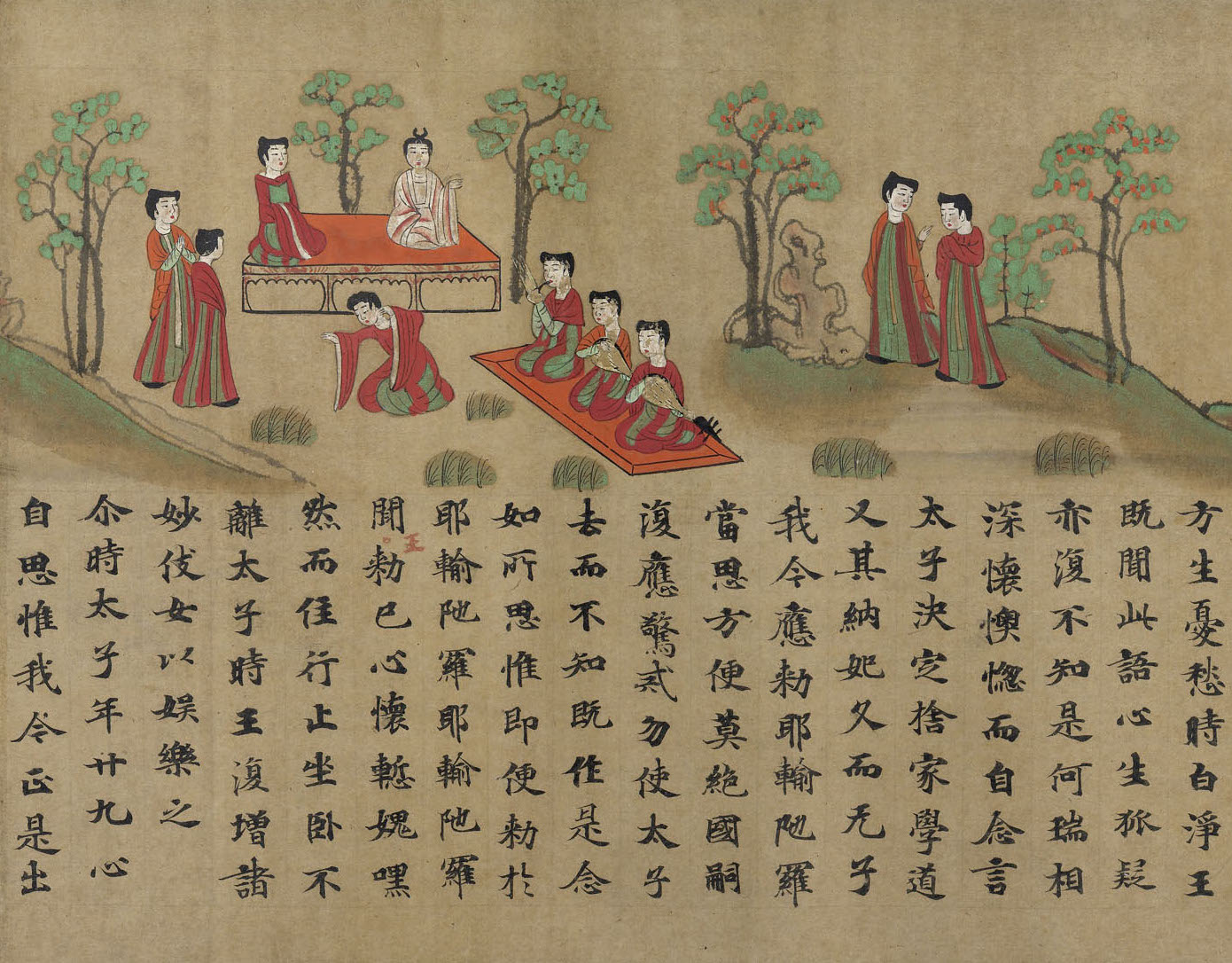
Illustrated Sutra of Cause and Effect (ICP) (Nara period) (Nara National Museum)

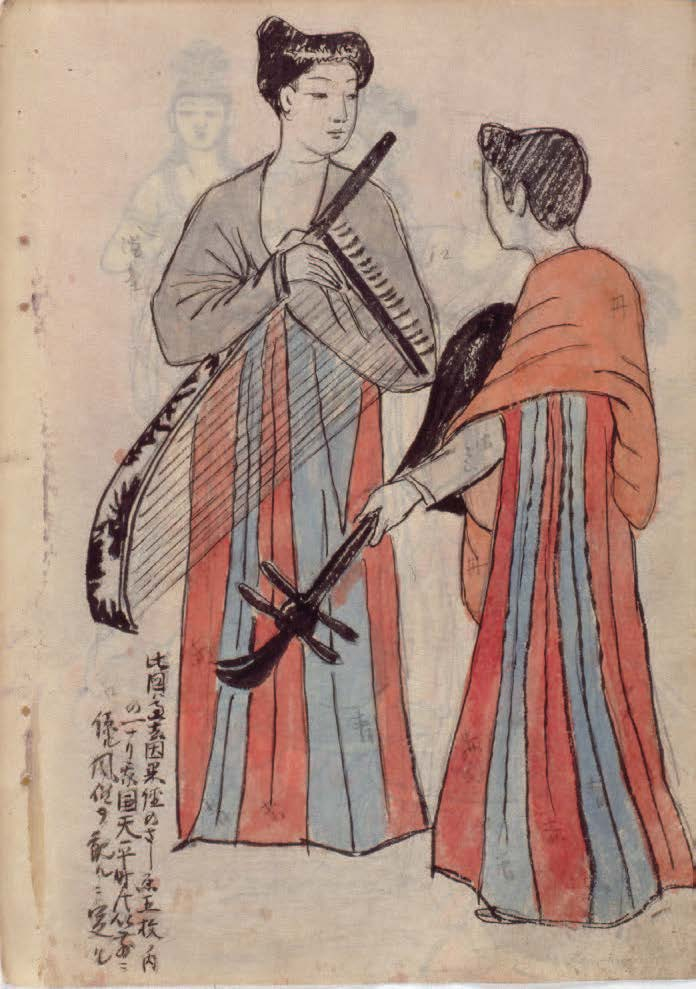
Illustrated Sutra of Cause and Effect from Fujishima Takeji's sketchbooks

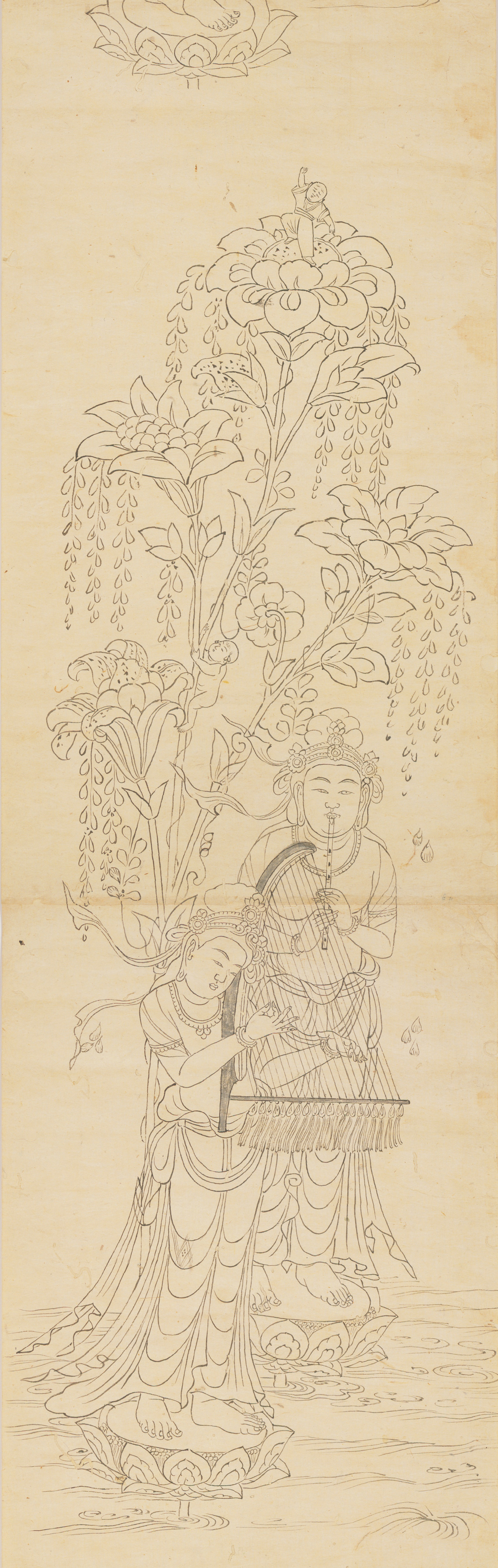
Preparatory Tobira-e, Kaidan-in, Tōdai-ji (ICP) (Kamakura period)

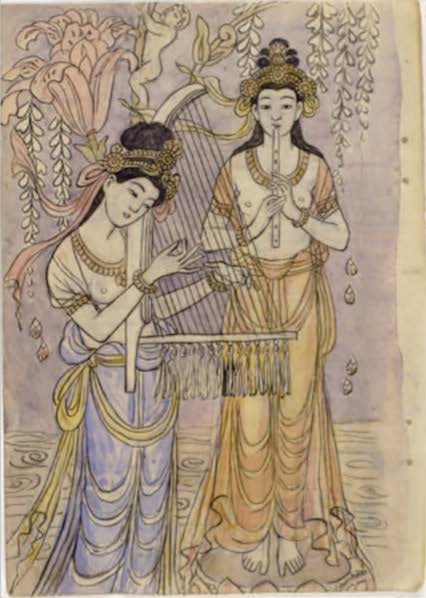
Tobira-e, Kaidan-in, Tōdai-ji from Fujishima Takeji's sketchbooks

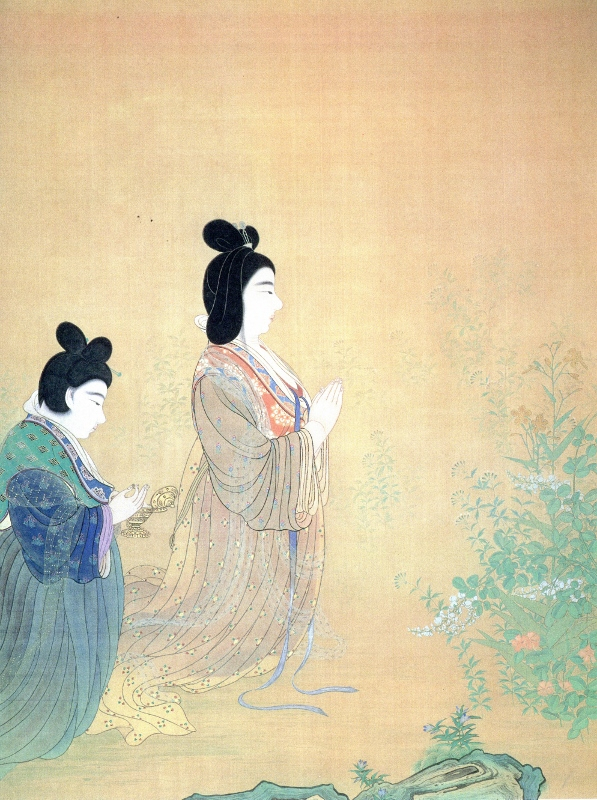
Empress Kōmyō (1897) by Shimomura Kanzan (Museum of the Imperial Collections)

Enjoyment (1904) by Aoki Shigeru (Ōhara Museum of Art)

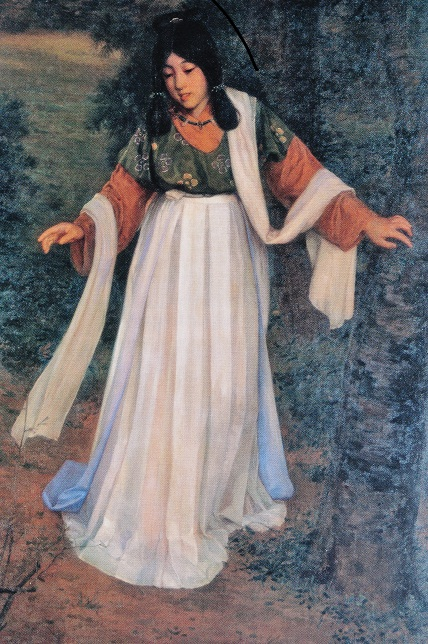
Sotoori-hime (1905) by Wada Eisaku (Kabuki-za)

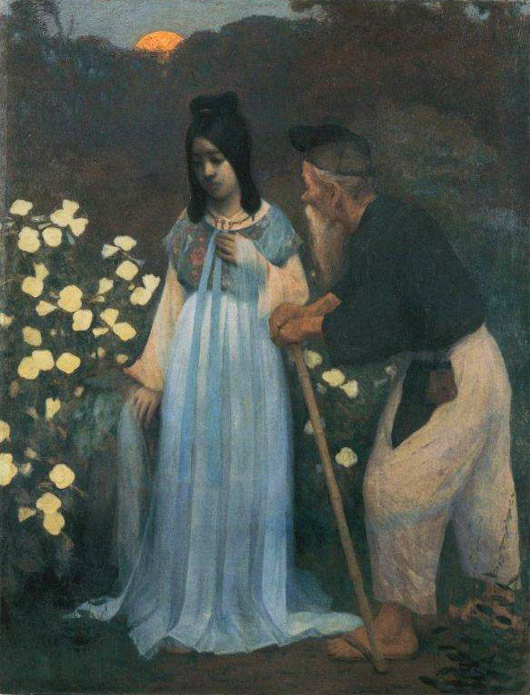
Kaguya-hime (1909) by Mitsutani Kunishirō (Kasama Nichidō Museum of Art)

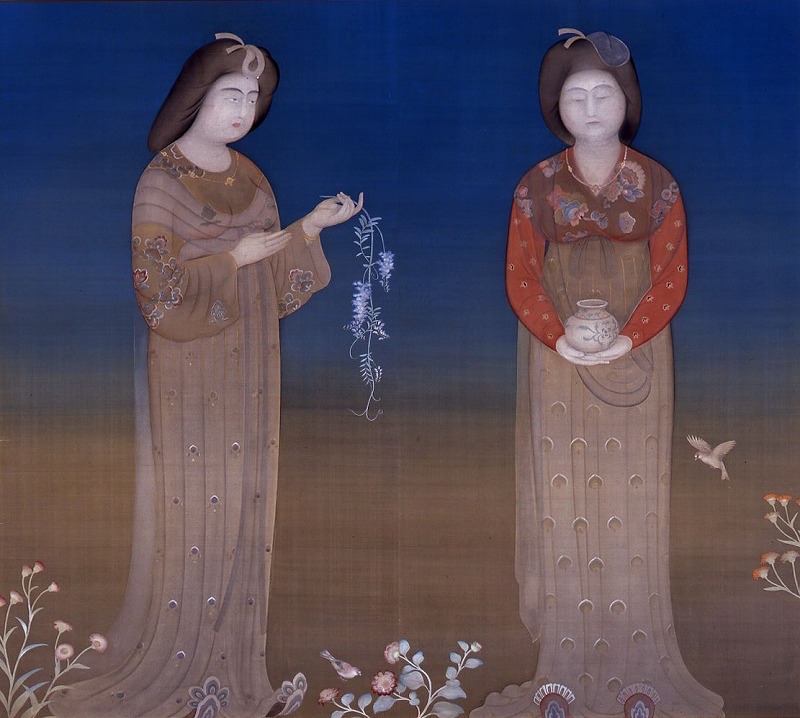
Standing Women (1924) by Kikuchi Keigetsu (Nagano Prefectural Shinano Art Museum)

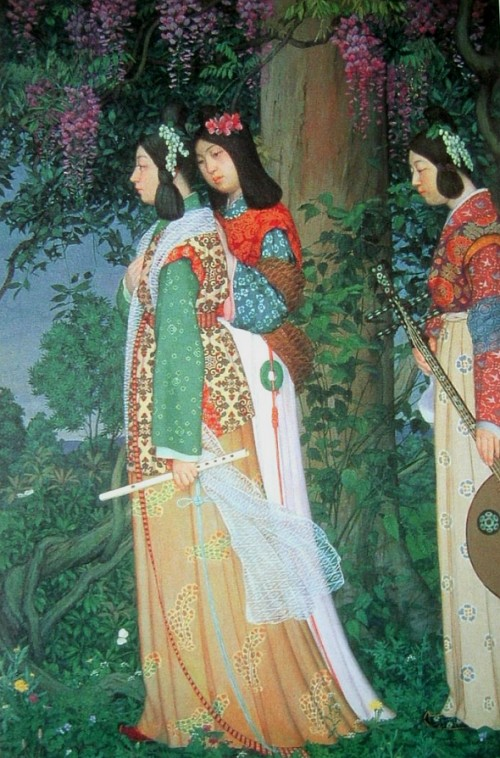
Field Entertainment (1925) by Wada Eisaku (University Art Museum, Tokyo University of the Arts)

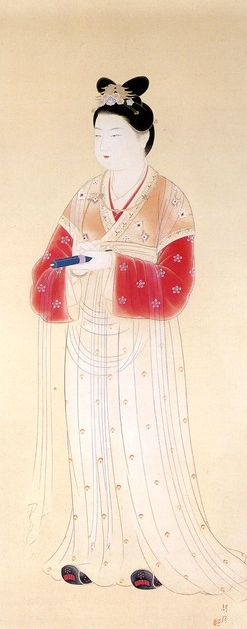
Empress Kōmyō (1944) by Kikuchi Keigetsu (Nagano Prefectural Shinano Art Museum)

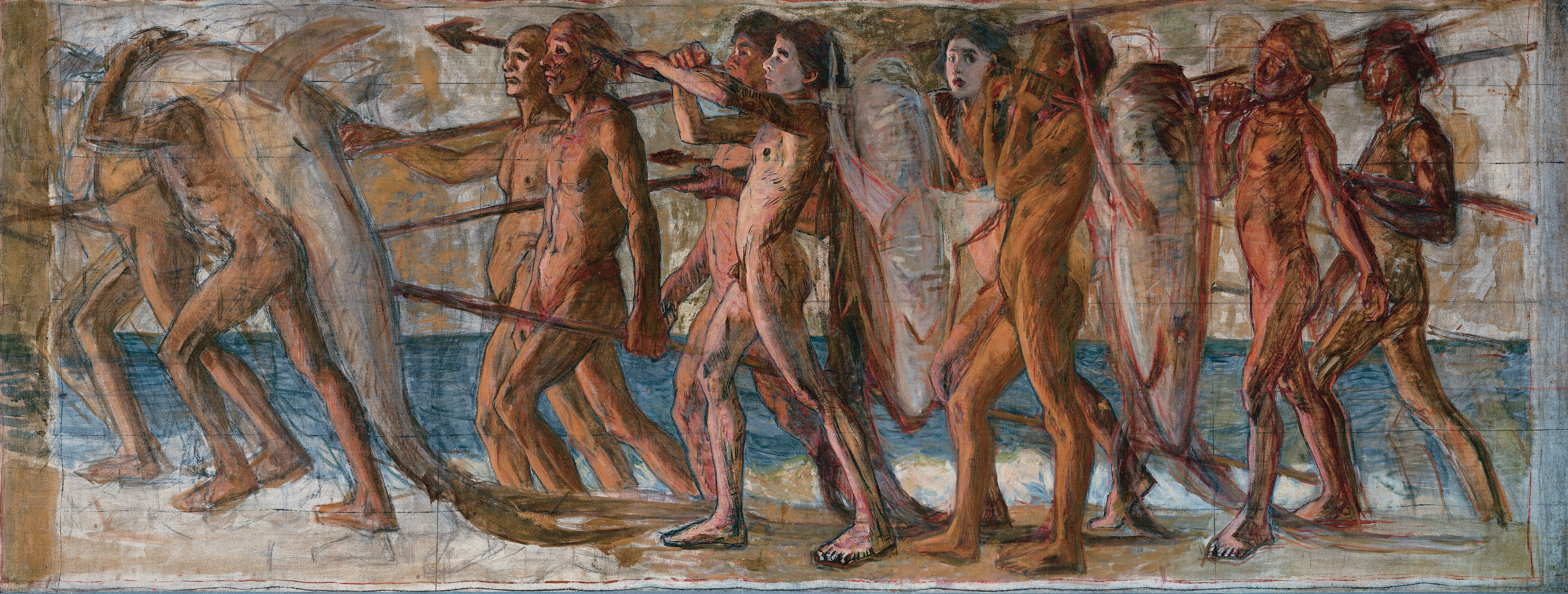
Harvest of the Sea (ICP) (1904) by Aoki Shigeru (Ishibashi Foundation Art Research Center)

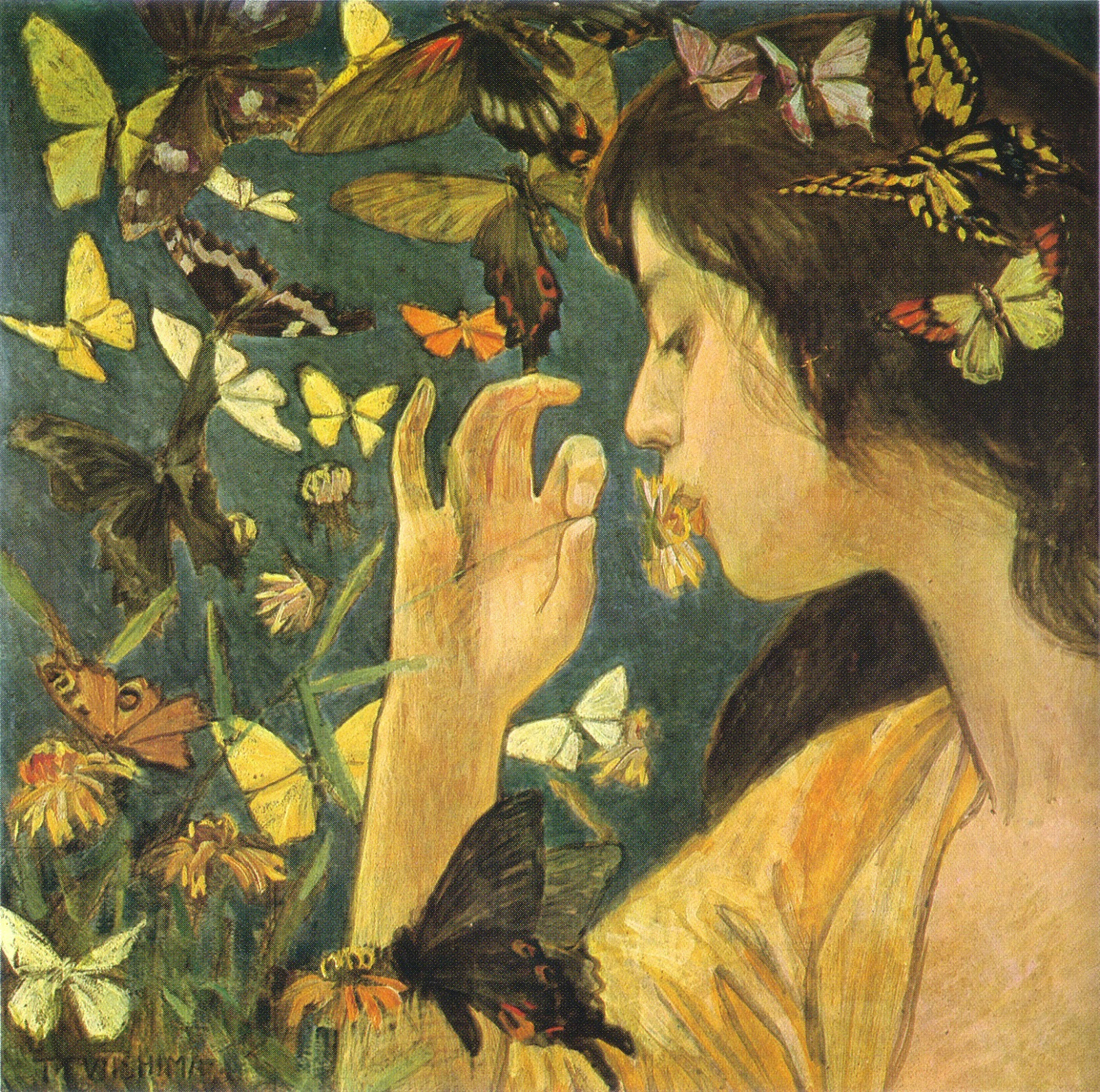
Butterflies (1904) by Fujishima Takeji (private collection)

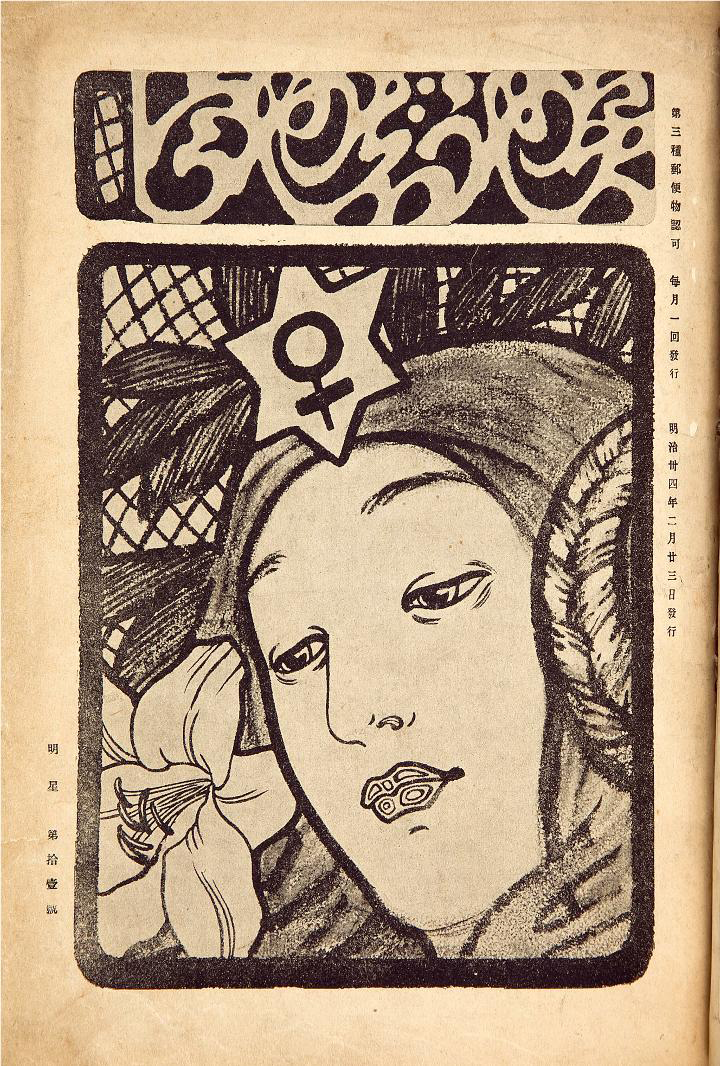
Cover for Myōjō by Fujishima Takeji, February 1901 edition

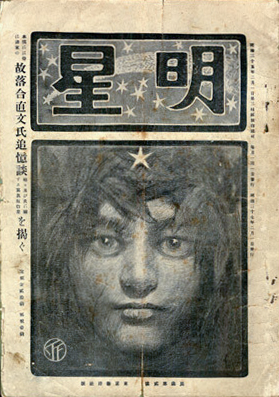
Cover for Myōjō by Fujishima Takeji, February 1904 edition

== See also ==
- Kuroda Seiki
- List of Cultural Properties of Japan - paintings (Tōkyō)
- List of National Treasures of Japan (paintings)
- List of works by Fujishima Takeji
