= Kikuchi =

Kikuchi, often written 菊池 or 菊地, may refer to:

== Places ==
- Kikuchi, Kumamoto
- Kikuchi River, Kumamoto
- Kikuchi District, Kumamoto

== People ==
- Kikuchi (surname)
- Kikuchi clan
- Yoshihiko Kikuchi
- Yusei Kikuchi

== Other ==
- Kikuchi disease, a rare, non-cancerous enlargement of the lymph nodes
- Kikuchi line (solid state physics), a line in an electron diffraction pattern for a crystal
- Kikuchi Line (Kumaden), a railway line in Kumamoto Prefecture connecting Kami-Kumamoto Station to Miyoshi Station
