= Zenken Kojitsu =

Illustrated history of Japanese historical figures and heroes

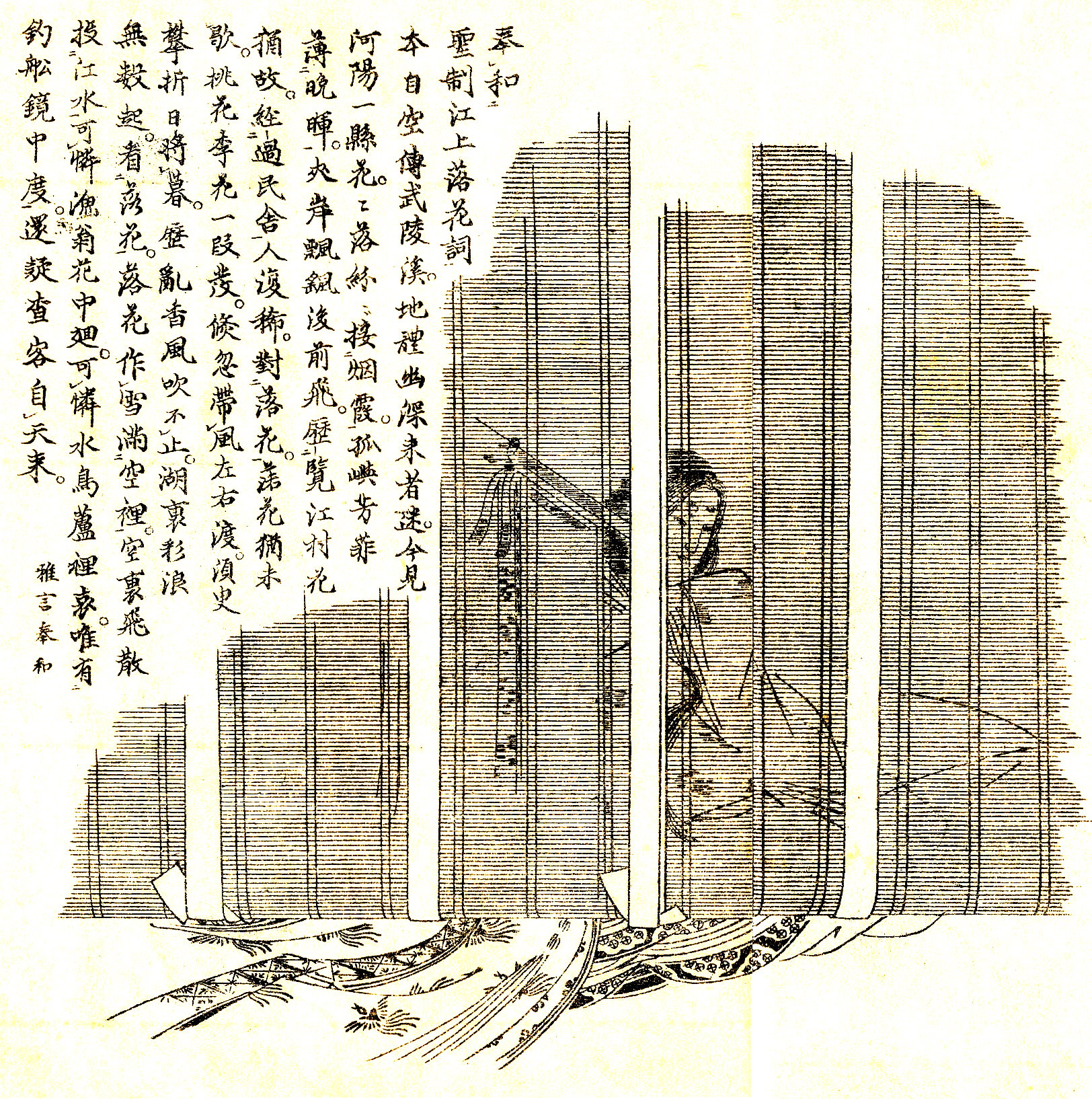
Princess Uchiko, the first Saiin – from the Zenken Kojitsu

The Zenken Kojitsu (前賢故実) is a collection of biographies of Japanese historical figures by Kikuchi Yōsai, first published from the late Edo period into the Meiji period. It consists of ten volumes and twenty books in total. Moving through time from antiquity through the Nanboku-chō period, it contains portraits and rough biographies in kanbun of 585 imperial family members, loyal retainers, and historical heroines. It was groundbreaking for its visualizations of Japanese historical figures and has been treasured as a bible for historical art since the rise in national consciousness of the Meiji period.

== Creation ==
According to a postscript by Yōsai's grandson Kikuchi Takeku, Yōsai began writing the series in 1818 and finished in 1868. Meanwhile, a foreword by the Confucian scholar Matsuda Nobuyuki noted that the manuscript had been completed, so it may be assumed that an initial draft was complete by that time. Additionally, the first edition of Volume 2, Book 4 was released in 1843, but after that publication stalled, perhaps for business reasons. The series was likely not released in complete form until the beginning of the Meiji Era in 1868. According to the introduction of the series, it seems that Yōsai had intended to create an additional volume of historical investigations. In 1903, Takeku and the editor Yamashita Shigetani released a version called the Kōshō Zenken Kojitsu (考証前賢故実), which contained an additional volume of investigations into the systems and customs of old Japan for a total of 11 volumes.

The style of the work is based on the biographical portraits of Chinese artists such as Shangguan Zhou (上官周). In the creation of the sketches, Yōsai also borrowed from the patterns of the Shūko Jisshu (集古十種) and emulated respected artists of the past, such as Ariwara no Narihira and Ono no Michikaze. However, some of his sketches held by the Tokyo National Museum show that he also used models to capture poses. In addition, a bibliography at the end of Volume 10 lists 264 different texts used for background research, including history books including the Kojiki and Nihon Shoki and literature including the Kokin Wakashū and The Tale of Genji. Additionally, the Tokyo National Museum possesses a version of the Zenken Kojitsu that includes sketches of the references used on each page, providing the sources for the costumes and possessions of the illustrated figures.

In 1850, a special copy of one book of the Zenken Kojitsu made its way, through the regent Takatsukasa Masamichi, to the eyes of Emperor Kōmei. Additionally, in 1868, a woodblock print copy of the complete series was presented to Emperor Meiji by Sanjō Sanetomi and Higashikuze Michitomi. For his achievement, Yōsai was in 1875 granted the title of Master Painter of Japan (日本畫士). This achievement is recorded only in documents associated with Yōsai himself, and has not been confirmable based on official documents.

== Influence ==
The Zenken Kojitsu had an immense impact on the art, especially historical art, of the Meiji period, in which it was used as an iconic reference and textbook on the systems and customs of old Japan. The historical researcher and painter Seki Yasunosuke (関保之助) later recalled that "it wouldn't be an exaggeration to say that in those days, there wasn't even a single historical artist who didn't study the Zenken Kojitsu." Those who borrowed from his style included not only his students, including Matsumoto Fūko (松本楓湖), Watanabe Shōtei, and Suzuki Kason (鈴木華邨), but also other Japanese painters like Hashimoto Gahō and Kobori Tomoto (小堀鞆音). Kajita Hango (梶田半古), who adored Yōsai's work, taught his students by making them copy the Zenken Kojitsu, producing excellent historical painters such as Seison Maeda and Kokei Kobayashi (小林古径).

The ukiyo-e woodblock prints of the Meiji era also frequently borrowed from the Zenken Kojitsu. Tsukioka Yoshitoshi adopted some of its techniques as early as 1867 in his Shuzōsuikomeimei-den (繍像水滸銘々伝), and his later works continued to show its influence. Yoshitoshi, who once aspired to be Yōsai's disciple, transformed Yōsai's scrupulous style into more intense scenes through dynamic compositions and strong colors. Yoshitoshi's pupils Toshihide Migita and Mizuno Toshikata (水野年方), along with other artists of the period such as Kobayashi Kiyochika and Ogata Gekkō, also reflected its influence, making the Zenken Kojitsu a basis for the ukiyo-e art of the period.

The influence of the Zenken Kojitsu even reached into the fields of sculpture and Western-style paintings. The historical paintings of the Western-style artists of the Meiji Bijutsu-kai, such as Honda Kinkichirō (本多錦吉郎) and Ishii Teiko (石井鼎湖), likewise reflect its influence. Hara Bushō (原撫松) also diligently copied the Zenken Kojitsu in his youth, and according to his friend Miyake Kokki (三宅克己), his comrades at art school did likewise. The sculptor Sano Akira (佐野昭), who studied under Vincenzo Ragusa, made a sculpture of Umashimaji-no-mikoto (ウマシマジ命), the ancestor god of the Mononobe clan, which also shows the effect of the Zenken Kojitsu, and is now in the Hamarikyu Gardens.

The Zenken Kojitsu even made its mark on public education. Various educational materials, including the 1881 book of ethics Yōgaku-Kōyō (幼学綱要), edited by Motoda Nagasane (元田永孚) and illustrated by Matsumoto Fūko, and the 1891 elementary-school history textbook Higher elementary school history (高等小学歴史), illustrated by the Western-style artist Indō Matate (印藤真楯), show its influence in their depictions of historical heroes.

In the early 20th century, though, even this popular work became old-fashioned. Shikō Imamura, Yasuda Yukihiko, Maeda Seison, Kokei Kobayashi, and the other members of the next generation of Japanese historical art, the disciples of Yōsai's disciples, continued to produce works based on the Zenken Kojitsu while they studied. However, as their focus shifted away from historical accuracy and the investigation of customs and towards expressions of artistic individuality and beauty, they ceased to look back on the Zenken Kojitsu.
