= Shin-etsu Broadcasting =

Radio and television broadcaster in Nagano Prefecture

Shin-etsu Broadcasting Co., Ltd.
- Logo used since 2012

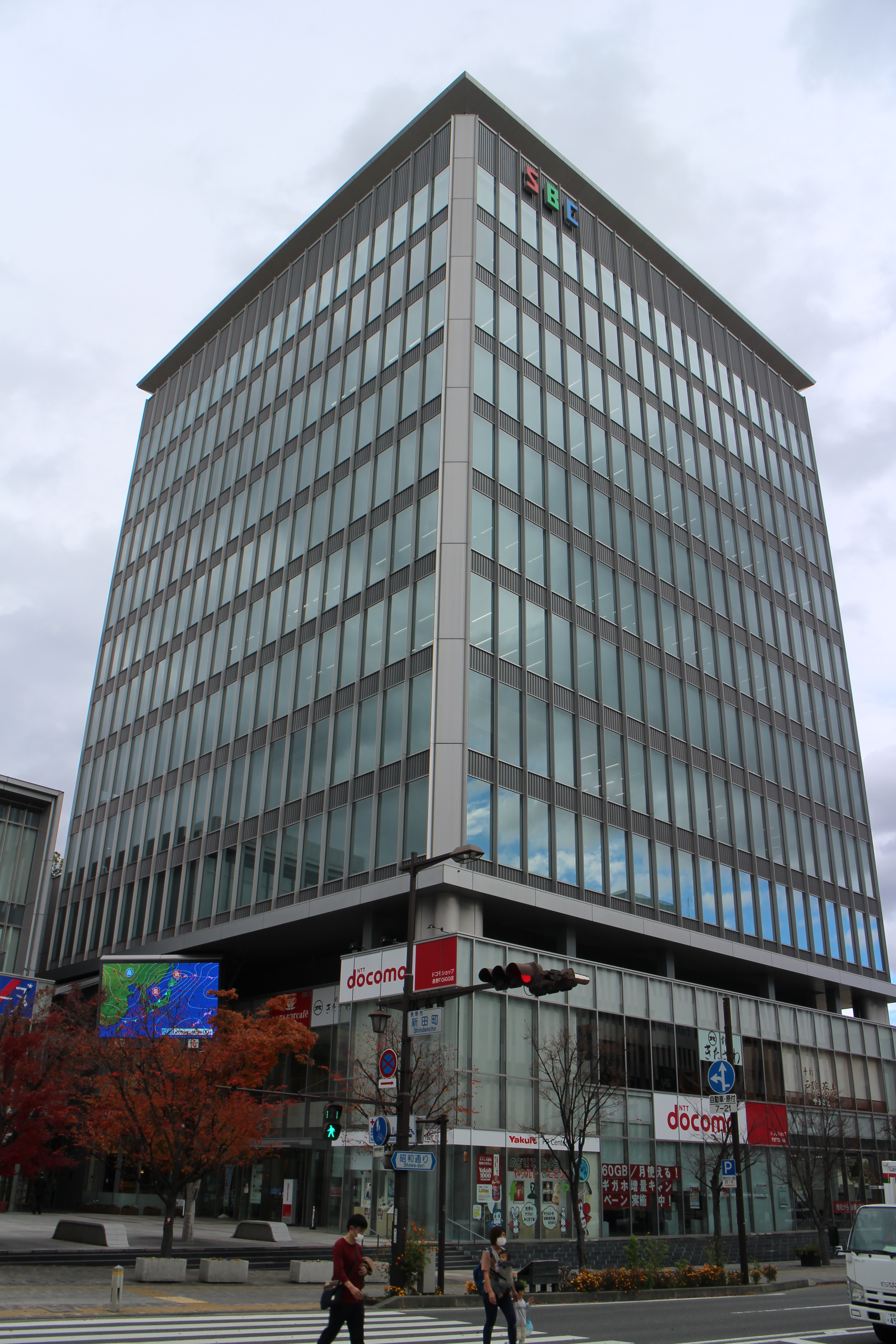
- SBC's headquarters located in TOiGO, one of Nagano City's business centers
- Native name: 信越放送株式会社
- Romanized name: Shin-etsu Hōsō Kabushiki-gaisha
- Formerly: Shinano Broadcasting Co., Ltd. (March 8, 1951 - April 29, 1952)
- Type: Kabushiki gaisha
- Industry: Radio and television network
- Founded: October 18, 1951; 75 years ago
- Headquarters: 1200 Toigoshomachi, Nagano City, Nagano Prefecture, Japan
- Key people: Masayoshi Watanabe (President and CEO)
- Subsidiaries: Estate Nagano Corporation; Contents Vision Inc. SBC Housing Corporation; INC Nagano Cable TV; Nagano Prefecture Culture Center
- Website: sbc21.co.jp
- Footnotes; Data from its Company Profile and Company History

JOSR
- Nagano; Japan
- Broadcast area: Nagano Prefecture
- Frequencies: 1098 kHZ (AM); 92.2 MHz (FM)
- Branding: SBC Radio

Programming
- Language: Japanese
- Format: Talk, Sports
- Affiliations: JRN/NRN

Ownership
- Owner: Shin-etsu Broadcasting Co., Ltd.

History
- First air date: March 25, 1952

Technical information
- Licensing authority: MIC

Links
- Website: sbc21.co.jp/blogwp/radio/

JOSR-DTV
- Nagano Prefecture; Japan
- City: Nagano
- Channels: Digital: 16 (UHF); Virtual: 6
- Branding: SBC Television

Programming
- Language: Japanese
- Affiliations: Japan News Network

Ownership
- Owner: Shin-etsu Broadcasting Co., Ltd.

History
- First air date: October 25, 1958
- Former call signs: JOSR-TV (1958–2011)
- Former channel numbers: 11 (analog VHF, 1958–2011)
- Former affiliations: Secondary: NTV/NNN/NNS (October 25, 1958-March 31, 1969 (partial Nippon TV programs) & September 30, 1980 (remaining Nippon TV programs)); Tertiary: NET/ANN (March 1, 1959 - March 31, 1969 (partial NET programs) & March 31, 1991 (remaining TV Asahi programs)); Quaternary: Fuji TV/FNN (March 1, 1959 - March 31, 1969)
- Call sign meaning: "Shin'etsu Radio"

Technical information
- Licensing authority: MIC

Links
- Website: sbc21.co.jp/blogwp/tv/

Shin-etsu Broadcasting Co., Ltd. (信越放送株式会社, Shin-etsu Hōsō Kabushiki-gaisha), also known as SBC, is a Japanese broadcast network affiliated with the Japan News Network (JNN) for TV and JRN/NRN for radio. Their headquarters are located in Nagano Prefecture.

The broadcaster was the first radio station outside Japan's five metropolitan prefectures. (Note: Hokkaido, Tokyo, Aichi, Osaka, Fukuoka)

== Network ==
- TV: Japan News Network (JNN)
- RADIO: Japan Radio Network (JRN), National Radio Network (NRN)

== History ==
After the establishment of the "Three Radio Laws" (Radio Law, Broadcasting Law, and Radio Supervisory Committee Establishment Law) in 1950, the Shinano Mainichi Shimbun attempted to establish a private broadcasting service.At its first meeting in March 1951, several companies, politicians, and financial institutions elected Shuntaro Katsuta (the then vice president of Shinano Mainichi Shimbun) as the president of Shinano Broadcasting.On October 18 of the same year, they obtained a preparatory broadcast license.

On March 25, 1952 at 5pm, Shinano Broadcasting started to be on air as the first commercial radio broadcaster in the prefecture. Upon its launch, the coverage area was limited to Nagano City, which led to it expanding its coverage area to other cities in the prefecture between 1953 and 1957. A week later, the company name was changed to Shin-etsu Broadcasting after it received funding from the local government of Jōetsu City in Niigata Prefecture.

In June 1953, Shin-etsu Broadcasting received an application for a TV license. Due to the mountainous terrain of Nagano Prefecture, the broadcaster started to build a main transmitter on Mount Utsukushigahara, the first in Japan to have a broadcast transmitter on a mountaintop. On March 14, 1958, it received a broadcast license. And on October 25, 1958 11:30am, SBC started broadcasting on TV. At that time, it aired programs from TBS and Nippon TV. On March 1, 1959, it also aired programs from Fuji TV and NET (currently known as TV Asahi), the same day the networks started to go on air (Nippon TV, TV Asahi, and Fuji TV programming gradually moved to TV Shinshu, Nagano Broadcasting, and Nagano Asahi Broadcasting when they opened). In August 1959, SBC joined the Japan News Network.

On October 1, 1964, SBC started broadcasting in color on the eve of the 1964 Tokyo Olympics. As part of the 15th anniversary of the broadcaster, they participated in the establishment of Nagano Prefectural Shinano Art Museum on October 1, 1966. In 1979, SBC alongside Minaminihon Broadcasting, Aomori Broadcasting, and Shikoku Broadcasting won the Broadcast Cultural Fund Award.

Digital terrestrial television broadcasts started on October 1, 2006 (Utsukushigahara Main Station, Zenkoji-daira Station, Matsumoto Station, Okaya-Suwa Station, Ina Station and Iida Station), the analog signals were switched off on July 24, 2011.
