= Watanabe Shōtei =

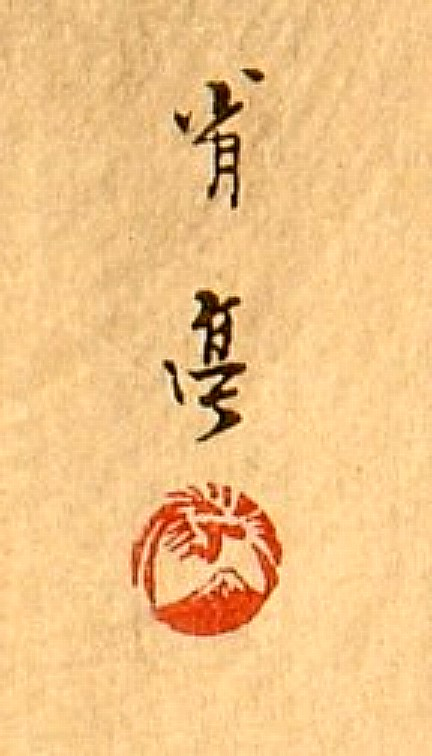
Watanabe Shōtei's signature and seal showing crane over Mount Fuji

Watanabe Seitei (渡辺 省亭; January 18, 1852 – April 2, 1918), also known as Watanabe Shōtei, was a Japanese Nihonga painter who was one of the first Japanese painters to visit Europe, attending the 1878 International Exhibition in Paris and being awarded a medal. He blended Western realism with the delicate colours and washes of the Kikuchi Yōsai school, introducing a new approach to kachōga (bird-and-flower painting).

== Biography ==
Born as Yoshikawa Yoshimata in Edo, he was later adopted by the family of his father's literary friend, Watanabe Mitsue. His early studies were at age sixteen under Kikuchi Yōsai (1788–1878) after which he spent a brief time in the studio of the painter and lacquer artist, Shibata Zeshin (1807–1891).

In 1878 he travelled in the United States and Europe, remaining in Paris for three years and becoming the first Nihonga artist to live in Europe with the aim of studying Western painting.

Travel abroad was extremely difficult for Japanese artists in the early Meiji period (1868–1912), and it is unknown how Shōtei managed this. A few years earlier, in 1875, he had produced designs for an export company, which may have provided him with the necessary contacts. His works have enjoyed great popularity in the West, and a large number are to be seen in both European and American collections.

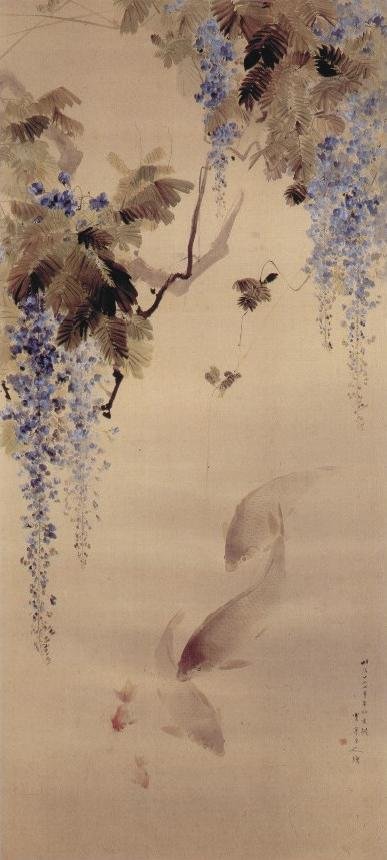
Summer. Blooming wisteria and fish, National Museum in Kraków

On his return from Europe, Seitei created designs for ceramics and cloisonné, working with the cloisonné artist Namikawa Sosuke (1847–1910), leading to acclaim from abroad. He maintained a prodigious output of paintings and illustrations, producing three outstanding albums: Seitei kacho gafu ('Picture album of Seitei's bird and flower'), 1890–91; Kacho gafu ('Bird and flower album'), 1903; and the last series published in 1916 also entitled Seitei kacho gafu.

Watanabe Shotei also edited and contributed to the art magazine Bijutsu Sekai (The World of Art), of which the first number was published by Wada Tokutaro in the year Meiji 23 (1890) and printed by Yoshida Ichimatsu with the blockcuts carried out by Goto Tokujiro. Besides Watanabe's illustration and that of Yoshitoshi Kyosai, there were ten other artists who contributed. Twenty-two of his bird and flower prints were published by Okura Yasugorō in 1916.

During his life he received many awards, in expositions in and out of Japan. He became a major inspiration to the following generation of Nihonga artists, notably Mizuno Toshikata (1866–1908) and Kaburagi Kiyokata (1878–1973).

== Gallery ==
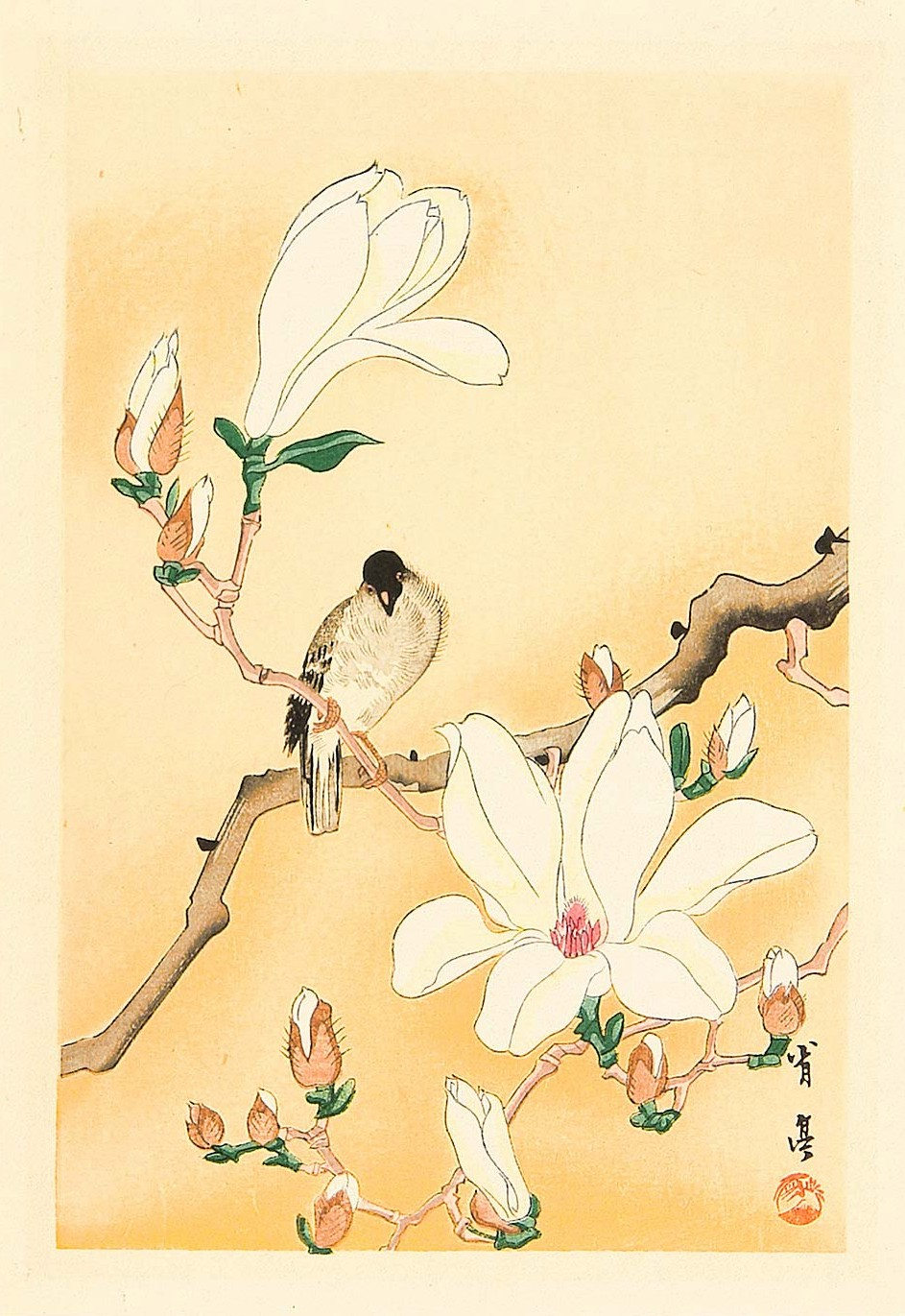
Bird and Magnolia

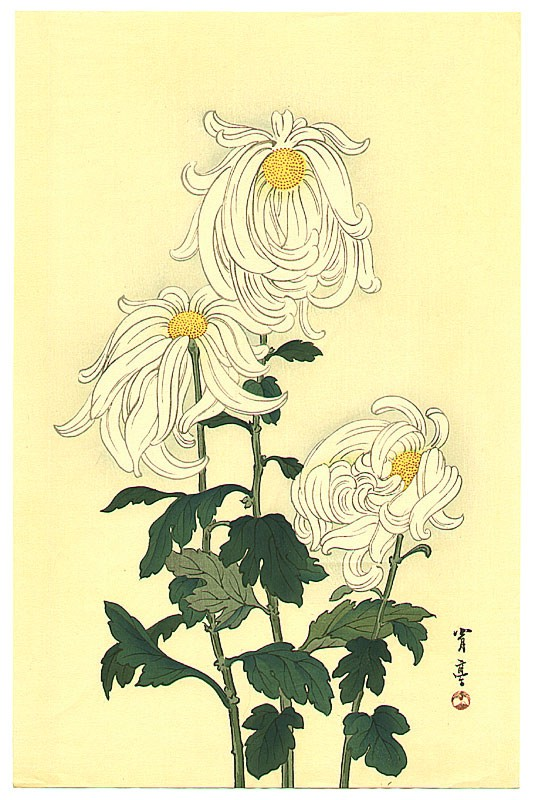
Chrysanthemum

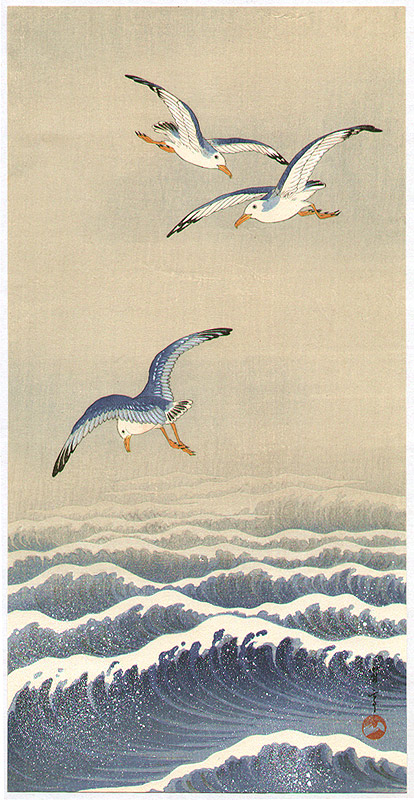
Seagulls over the Waves

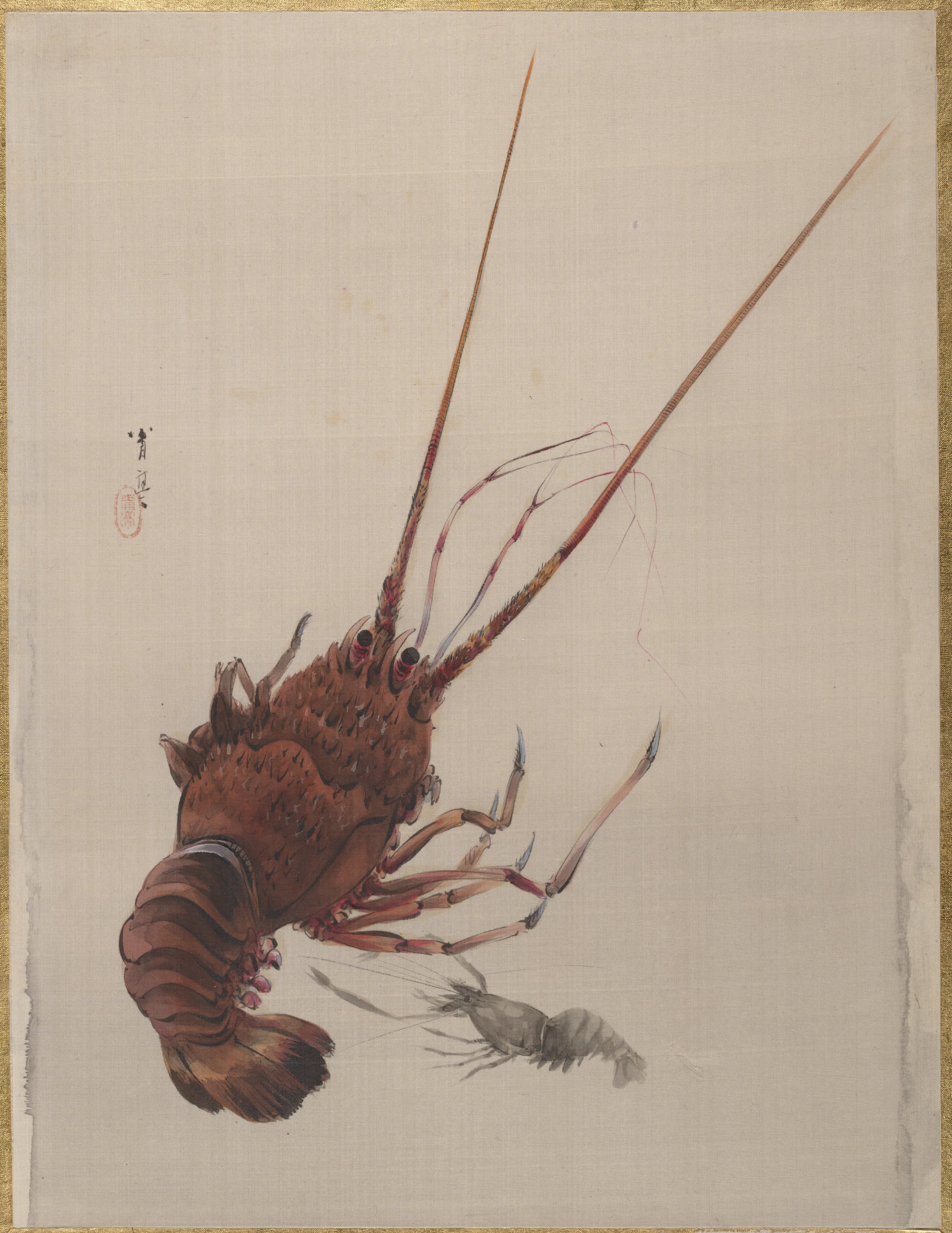
Album leaf, ca. 1887.
