= Kikuchi (surname) =

Kikuchi (written: 菊池 or 菊地, lit. "chrysanthemum pond" and "chrysanthemum earth/land") is a Japanese surname. Notable people with the surname include:

- Ayaka Kikuchi (singer) (菊地 あやか; born 1993), Japanese singer, actress, model and idol, former member of AKB48
- Ayaka Kikuchi (speed skater) (菊池 彩花; born 1987), Japanese speed skater
- Kikuchi Dairoku (菊池 大麓; 1855–1917), Japanese mathematician, educator, and education administrator
- Daisuke Kikuchi (菊池 大介; born 1991), Japanese footballer
- Himiko Kikuchi (菊池 ひみこ; born 1953), Japanese jazz pianist
- Kan Kikuchi (菊池 寛; 1888–1948), Japanese writer
- Kan Kikuchi (footballer) (菊池 完; born 1977), Japanese footballer
- Kazuhito Kikuchi (菊池 一仁; born 1977), Japanese composer
- Kikuchi Keigetsu (菊池 契月; 1879–1955), Japanese painter
- Kokoro Kikuchi (born 1982) Japanese voice actress
- Fuma Kikuchi (菊池 風磨, born 1995), Japanese idol and actor
- Masabumi Kikuchi (1939–2015), Japanese jazz pianist
- Masami Kikuchi (菊池 正美; born 1960), Japanese voice actress
- Mika Kikuchi (菊地 美香; born 1983), Japanese actress, voice actress and singer
- Moa Kikuchi (菊地 最愛; born 1999), Japanese musician, singer, model and actress
- Momoko Kikuchi (菊池 桃子; born 1968), Japanese actress, entertainer, singer, and scholar
- Naoya Kikuchi (菊地 直哉; born 1984), Japanese footballer
- Rinko Kikuchi (菊地 凛子; born 1981), Japanese actress
- Ruriko Kikuchi (菊池 るり子), Japanese classical pianist
- Ryosuke Kikuchi (菊池 涼介; born 1990), Japanese professional baseball player
- Ryuho Kikuchi (菊池 流帆; born 1996), Japanese footballer
- Ryuzo Kikuchi (菊地 隆一; born 1942), Japanese rower
- Satoshi Kikuchi (菊池 悟; born 1952), Japanese handball player
- Seishi Kikuchi (菊池 正士; 1902–1974), Japanese physicist
- Shiho Kikuchi (菊池 志穂; born 1972), Japanese voice actress
- Shunsuke Kikuchi (菊池 俊輔; 1931-2021), Japanese composer
- Shunsuke Kikuchi (footballer) (菊地 俊介; born 1991), Japanese footballer
- Sumire Kikuchi (菊池 純礼; born 1996), Japanese speed skater
- Takeo Kikuchi (菊池 武夫; born 1939), Japanese industrial and fashion designer
- Tarcisio Isao Kikuchi (菊地 功, born 1958), Japanese Roman Catholic Archbishop
- Tsuyoshi Kikuchi (菊地 毅; born 1964), Japanese professional wrestler
- Yasuro Kikuchi (菊池 康郎; 1929-2021), Japanese Go player
- Kikuchi Yōsai (菊池 容斎; 1781–1878), Japanese painter
- Yoshiaki Kikuchi (菊池 禎晃; born 1995), Japanese footballer
- Yoshihiko Kikuchi (菊地 良彦; born 1941), general authority of The Church of Jesus Christ of Latter-day Saints
- Yuki Kikuchi (菊池 悠希; born 1990), Japanese speed skater
- Yusei Kikuchi (菊池 雄星; born 1991), Japanese baseball player

== See also ==
- Kikuchi clan, a Japanese clan
