= Koyama Shōtarō =

Japanese painter (1857–1916)

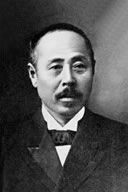
Koyama Shōtarō (date unknown)

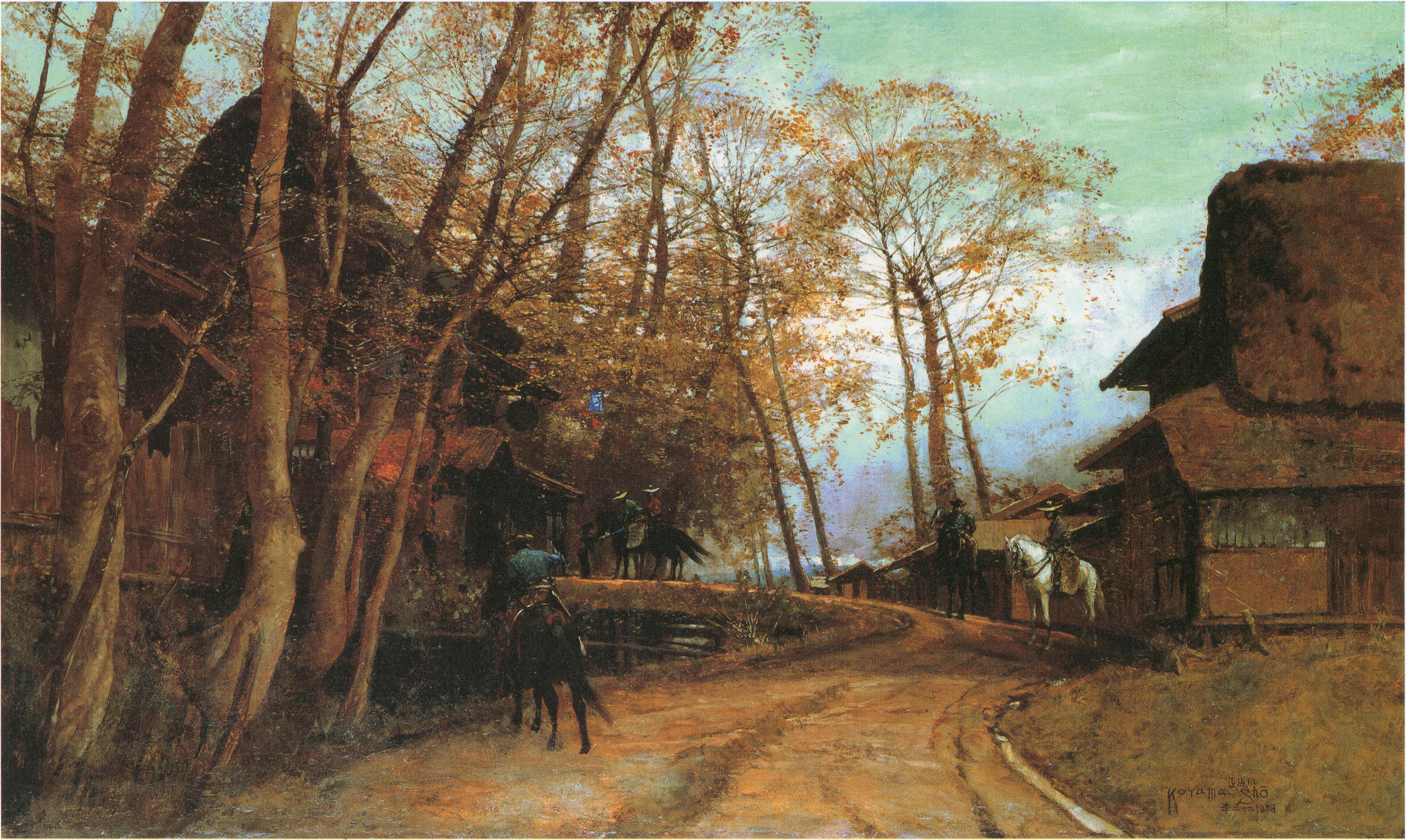
Quenching Thirst with Raw Sake at a Shop in the Autumn Countryside

Koyama Shōtarō (Japanese:小山 正太郎; 15 February 1857, Nagaoka - 7 January 1916, Tokyo) was a Japanese painter. He was one of the first to work in the yōga style.

== Life and work ==
His father was an acupuncturist. He completed his primary education at the British School in Tokyo. His began his artistic education at a private school in Tokyo operated by Kawakami Tōgai, then took lessons at the Technical Fine Arts School (now the Tokyo Institute of Technology), operated by the Ministry of Industry. There, he came under the influence of the Italian artist, Antonio Fontanesi, head of the painting classes, who was instrumental in introducing Western style painting to Japan. During his military service, he also studied watercolor painting with the French artist, Abel Guérineau under the auspices of the Ministry of the Army. Two of his younger brothers pursued military careers.

When Fontanesi returned to Italy in 1878, Koyama was dissatisfied with his replacement and left the school. Together with some friends, he founded the Association of the Eleventh (十一次会), so called because that was the eleventh year of the Meiji era. In 1889, together with Asai Chū, Matsuoka Hisashi and others, he created the Meiji Art Association.

Meanwhile, he had opened his own painting school in the Hongō district of Tokyo, that he called Fudō-sha (不同社; roughly, "diversity"). Many famous yōga style painters were among his students there, including Nakamura Fusetsu, Yoshida Hiroshi, Mitsutani Kunishirō, Aoki Shigeru and Kanokogi Takeshirō. He also taught at Tokyo High School. During the First Sino-Japanese War, from 1894 to 1895, he worked as a war artist. In 1900, thanks to financial support from the Ministry of Education, he was able to visit Paris and London.

His body of work was rather small and received little exposure. He worked in a modified academic style and favored dark shades of brown.

== Sources ==
- Tazawa, Yutaka (1981). "Koyama Shōtarō". Biographical Dictionary of Japanese Art. Kodansha International. ISBN 0-87011-488-3.
- Laurance P. Roberts (1976). "Koyama Shōtarō". A Dictionary of Japanese Artists. Weatherhill. ISBN 0-8348-0113-2.

Media related to Koyama Shōtarō at Wikimedia Commons
