= Takeshirō Kanokogi =

Japanese painter

Takeshiro Kanokogi
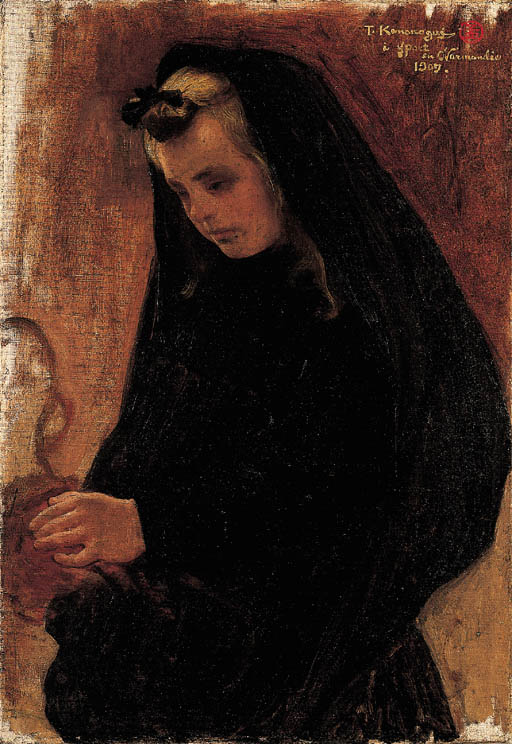
- Study for Beach in Normandy, 1907
- Born: 1874; Okayama Prefecture
- Died: 1941 (aged 66–67)
- Education: Académie Julian
- Known for: Painting

Takeshiro Kanokogi (鹿子木 孟郎, Kanokogi Takeshirō; 1874–1941) was a Japanese painter.

== Biography ==
Takeshiro Kanokogi studied with painters Matsubata Sangoro and later Koyama Shōtarō in Tokyo. He traveled back and forth to Paris France several times, at first when he was 26 years old. He spent around seven years in the city, during which time he studied with Jean-Paul Laurens and Émile-René Ménard at the Académie Julian.

He is known for portrait, figure, land and seascape painting in the Western style.

== Images ==
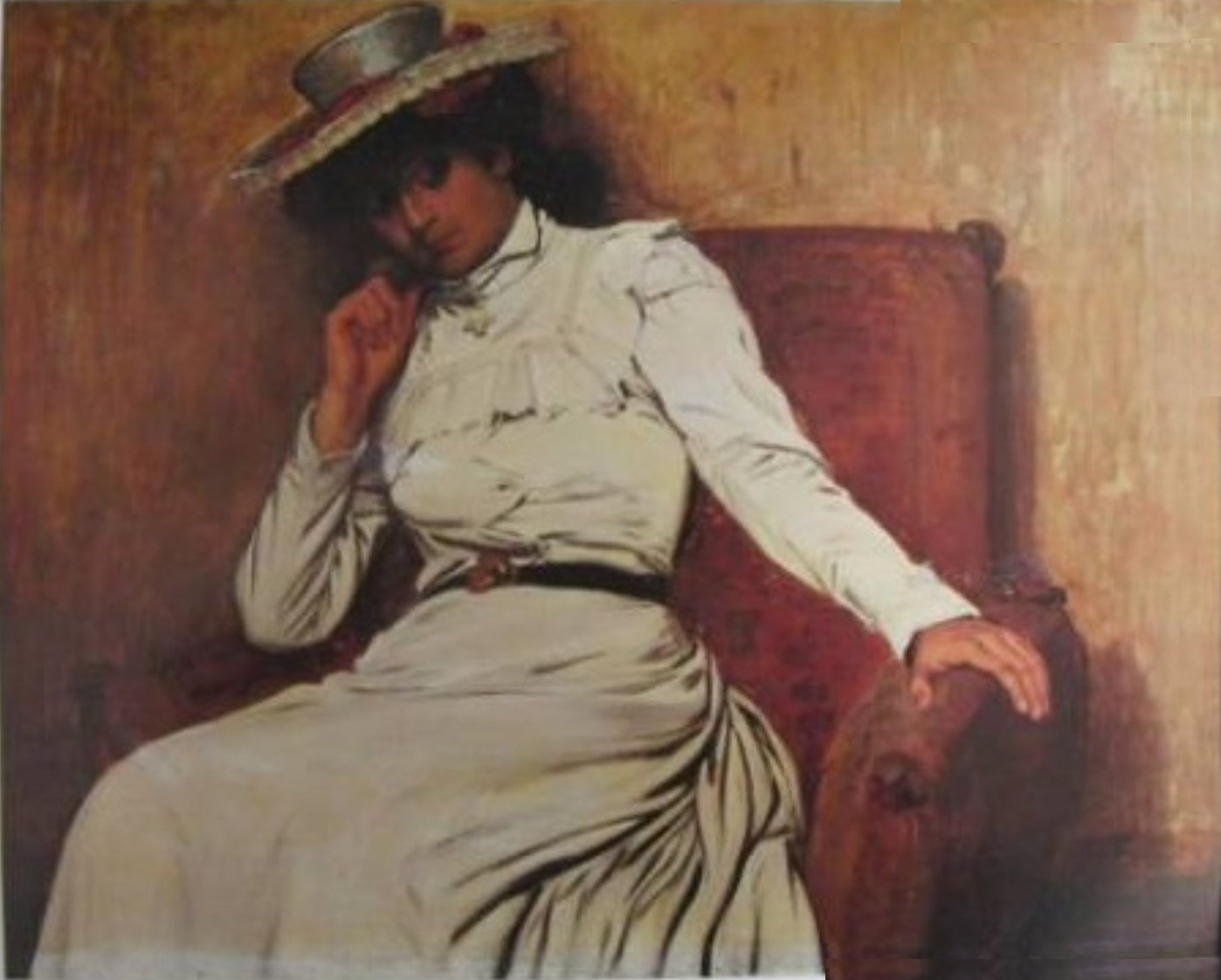
European Woman

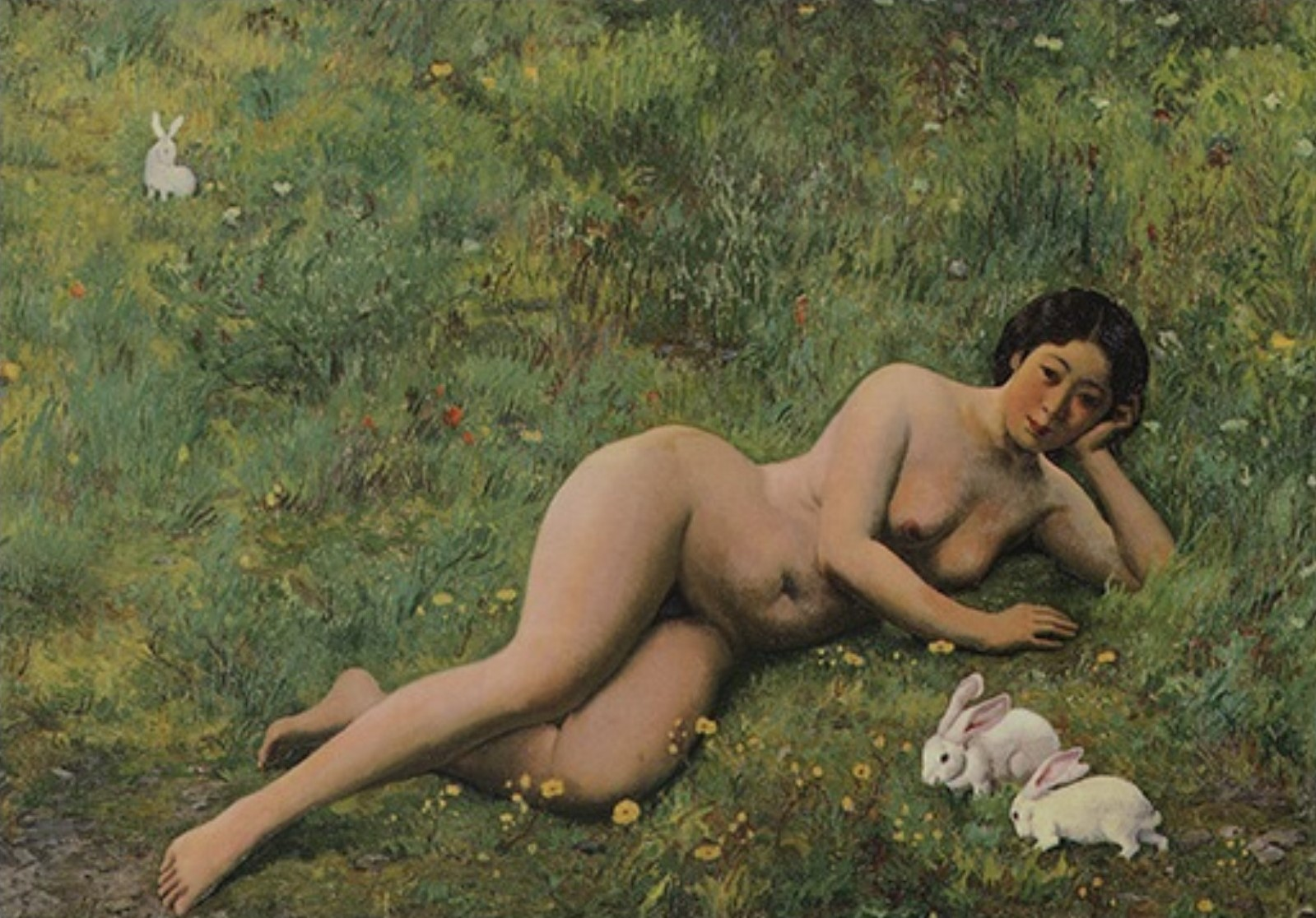
Moon

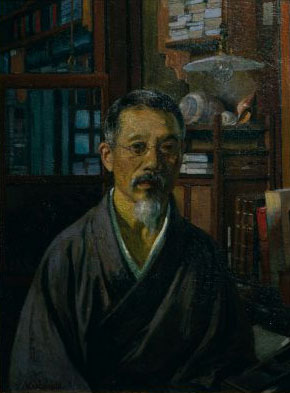
Dr. Kaio Hirase

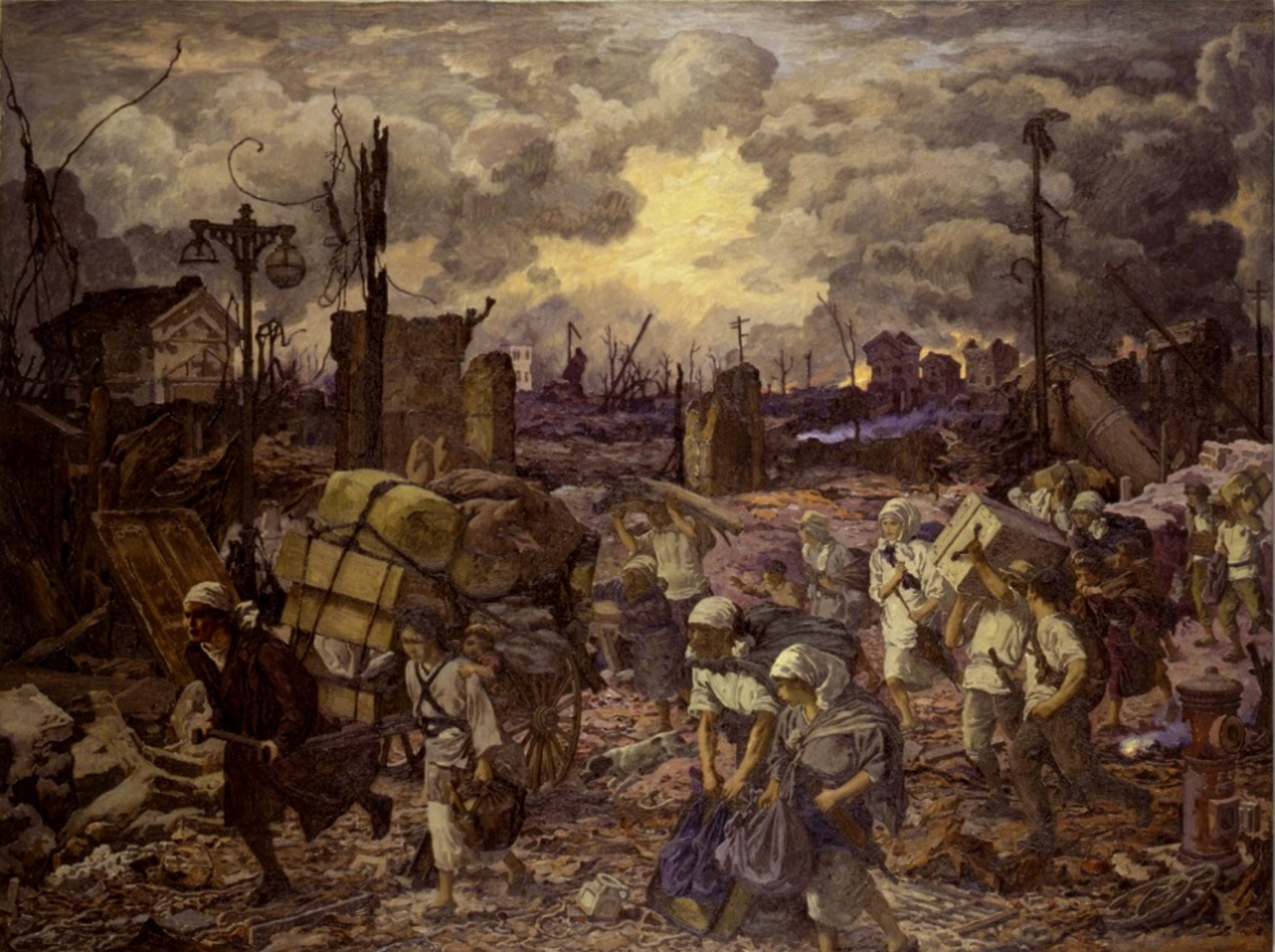
1923 Great Kantō earthquake 1923

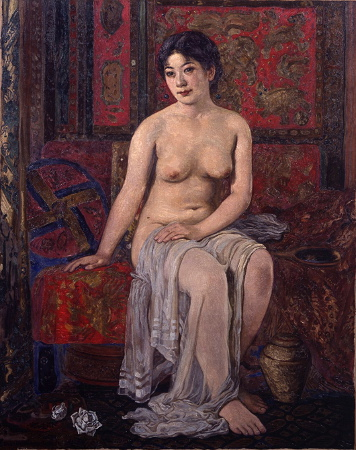
Lady with a Red rose

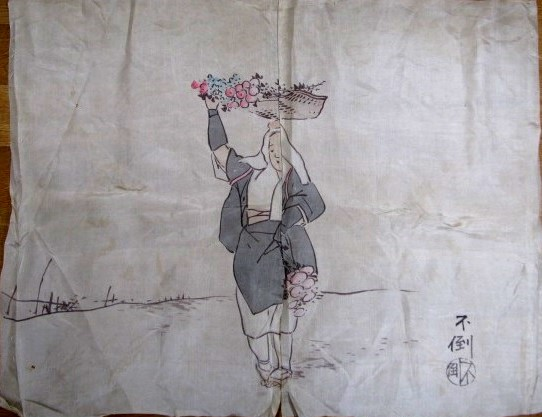
Drawing, signed with Futō

== Collections ==
- Hiroshima Museum of Art
- Kurashiki City Art Museum
- Musée d'Orsay

== Bibliography ==
La vie et l’œuvre de Takeshiro Kanokogui: peintre japonais, by Matsutarô Tokumi; translation by Masakiyo Miyamoto and Louis Marchand, Institut Franco-Japonais de Kyôto.
