= Mitsutani Kunishirō =

Japanese painter (1874–1936)

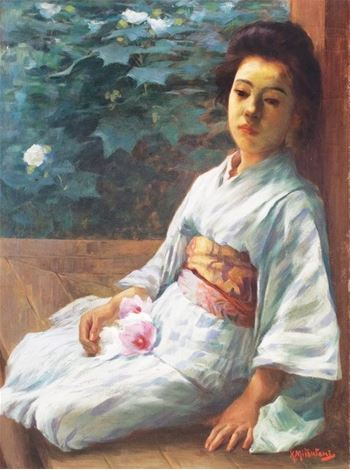
Flowers

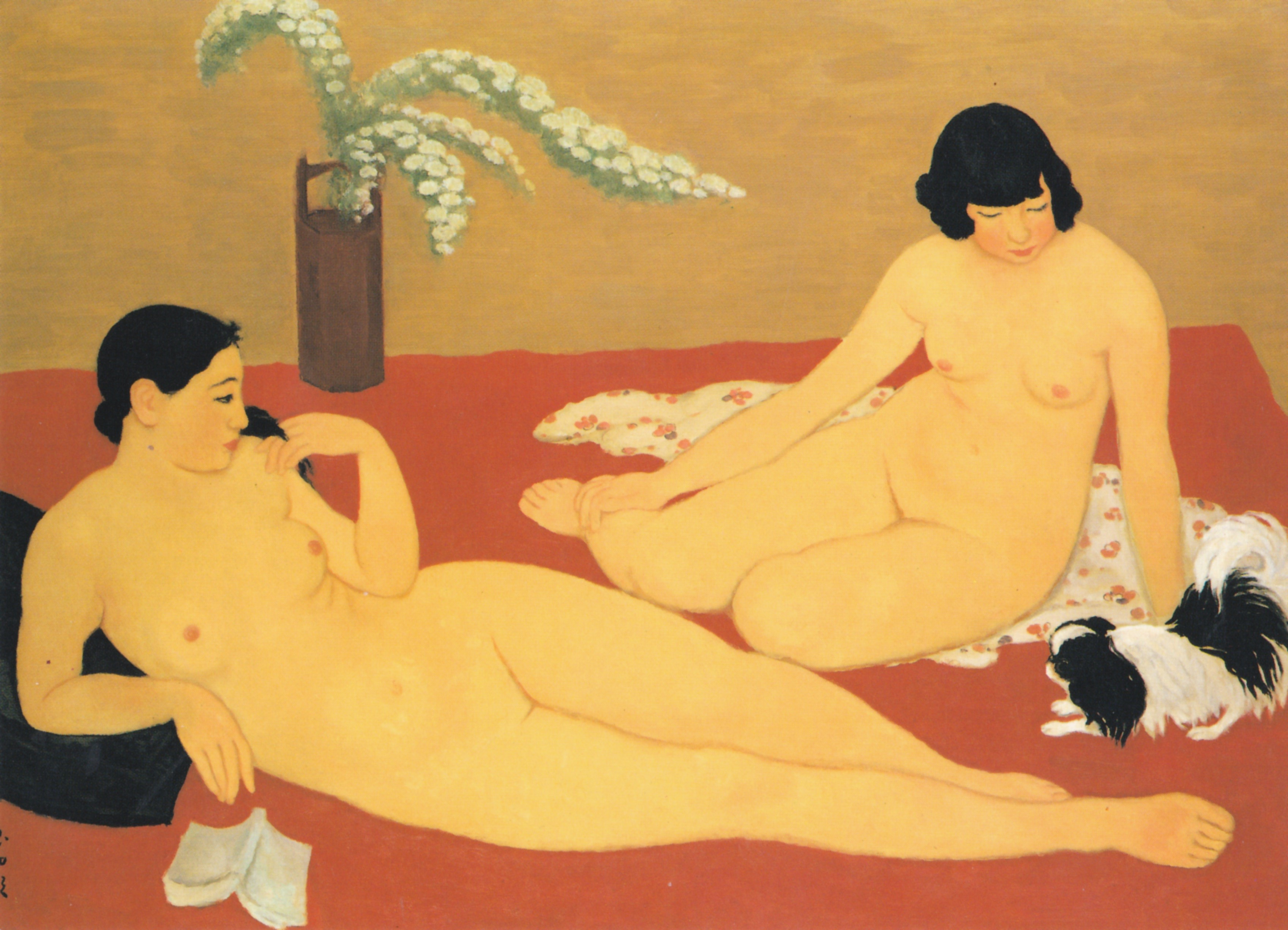
Scarlet Carpet

Mitsutani Kunishirō (Japanese: 満谷 国四郎; 10 November 1874 in Okayama Prefecture – 12 July 1936 in Tokyo) was a Japanese painter in the yōga style.

== Life and work ==
His uncle, Hori Wada, was a businessman who also created some of the first Western-style paintings in Okayama. During his primary education, he displayed an early aptitude for art and was discovered by Yoshitomi Asajirō, a well-known artist who was serving as a substitute teacher. After graduating, in 1891, he went to Tokyo. The following year, he began studies with Koyama Shōtarō at his private school; "Fudō-sha" (不同社; roughly, Diversity).

In 1900, he went to Europe to exhibit at the Exposition Universelle, won an award, and stayed there through 1901; taking a few lessons from Jean-Paul Laurens. Upon his return, he and some like-minded artists created "Pacific Art", an association devoted to Western-style painting.

In 1907, he served as a jury member at the first exhibition held by the Ministry of Culture. Later that same year, he was awarded first prize at the Economic Development Fair sponsored by Tokyo Prefecture. He returned to Europe in 1911 for further studies, with financial assistance from Magosaburō Ōhara, and lived there until the outbreak of World War I in 1914.

He was named a member of the Japan Art Academy in 1925. Over the next few years, he visited China four times. During this time, his works became more decorative in nature. During his later years, he was closely involved with the Meiji Memorial Picture Gallery.

== Sources ==
- Sanpei Yoshioka (Ed.), Okayama Biographical Encyclopedia (岡山人名事典), Nikkei Publishing, 1994 ISBN 978-4-88197-509-1
- Laurance P. Roberts: "Mitsutani Kunishirō", In: A Dictionary of Japanese Artists. Weatherhill, 1976. ISBN 0-8348-0113-2.
