= Nakamura Fusetsu =

Japanese painter

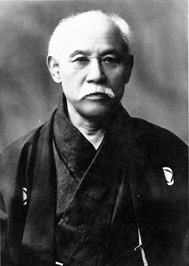
Nakamura Fusetsu

Nakamura Fusetsu (中村 不折, originally Sakutarō, 19 August 1866, Tokyo – 6 June 1943, Tokyo) was a Japanese painter in the yōga style. He was also known as a calligrapher.

== Life and work ==
When he was still a child, his family moved to Nagano Prefecture to escape the difficulties created by the Meiji Restoration. After showing an aptitude for art, he received lessons in nanga and European-style painting. He returned to Tokyo in 1887 to take lessons from Koyama Shōtarō at a school operated by the "Association of the Eleventh" (十一次会) then, later, at Koyama's own school; "Fudō-sha" (不同社; roughly, Diversity).

In 1894, he met the poet, Masaoka Shiki, who also worked as a journalist, and obtained a position doing illustrations for Small Japanism, an Anti-colonialist newspaper. It was at this time that he began using the name "Fusetsu" (infallible). In 1895, he went to China in the company of Masaoka, who was then working as a war correspondent. There, he painted scenes from the First Sino-Japanese War and developed an interest in calligraphy. Later, he worked for both the Nippon Shimbun and the Asahi Shimbun.

In 1900, he submitted paintings to the Exposition Universelle in Paris and received a small prize. Shortly after, he went to France to study with Raphaël Collin; then with Jean-Paul Laurens, who had been one of Koyama's instructors when he was there. Upon returning to Japan in 1905, he became a member of "Pacific Art, a group devoted to the promotion of Western-style painting. His first showing included a portrayal of the Imperial Family's ancestor goddess, Amaterasu, and her seven protectors, which drew the ire of Kuki Ryūichi, the Minister of Education, because they were portrayed in the nude. The painting was later destroyed in the Great Kantō Earthquake.

He sat on the jury for several showings, including the first Tokyo Industrial Exhibition and the first Ministry of Culture Art Exhibition. In 1919, he was elected a member of the Japan Art Academy. He also did book illustrations; notably for I am a Cat by Natsume Sōseki (1906), and the Blue Cliff Record.

He was not only a calligrapher himself, but spent his life collecting examples of Classical calligraphy; both Japanese and Chinese. In 1936, he used his collection to establish a calligraphy museum in Tokyo. It was maintained by the Nakamura family until 1995, when it was donated to Taitō, a Special Ward of Tokyo.

== Selected paintings ==
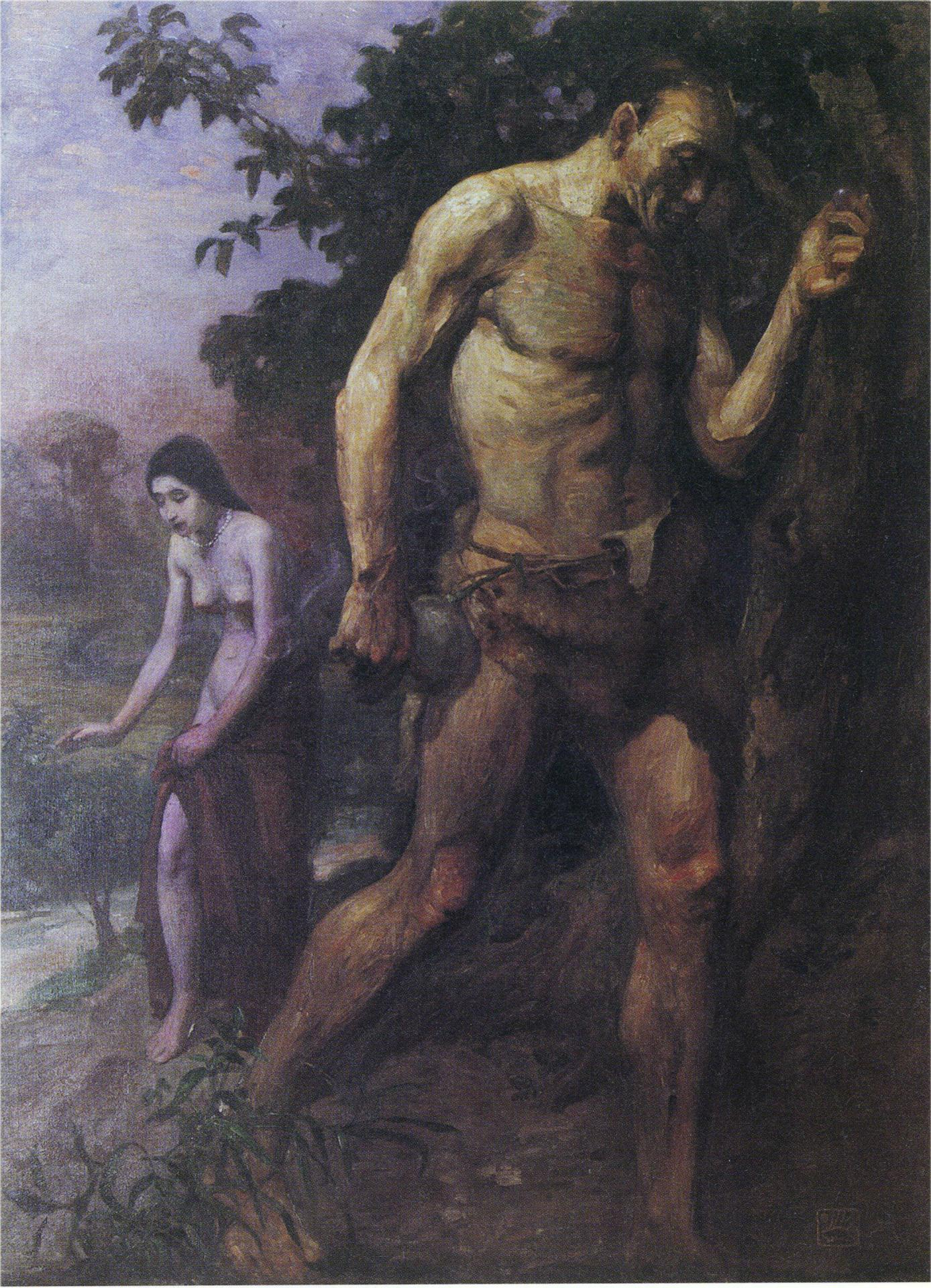
Footprint of the Giant

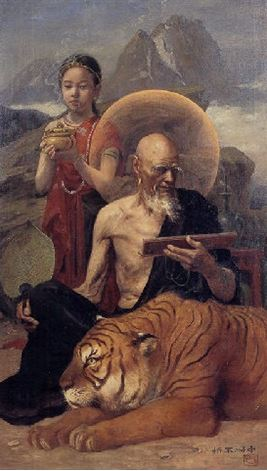
Preparing for the Ritual

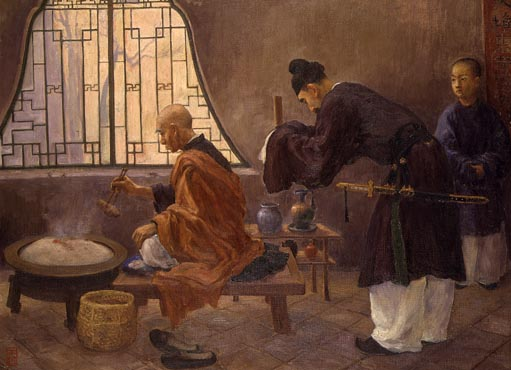
Ignoring a Message from the Emperor
(from the Blue Cliff Record)

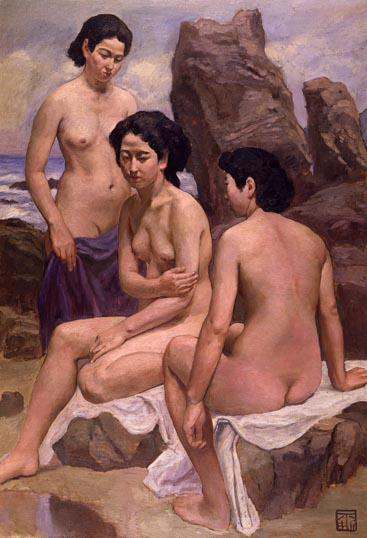
Three Girls on the Beach

== Sources ==
- Suzuki, Toshihiko (Ed.): "Nakamura Fusetsu". In: Encyclopedia Nipponica, Shogakukan, 2001.
- Laurance P. Roberts: "Nakamura Fusetsu". In: A Dictionary of Japanese Artists. Weatherhill, 1976. ISBN 0-8348-0113-2
