= Nagano Prefectural Shinano Art Museum =

Art museum in Nagano, Japan

- 長野県信濃美術館
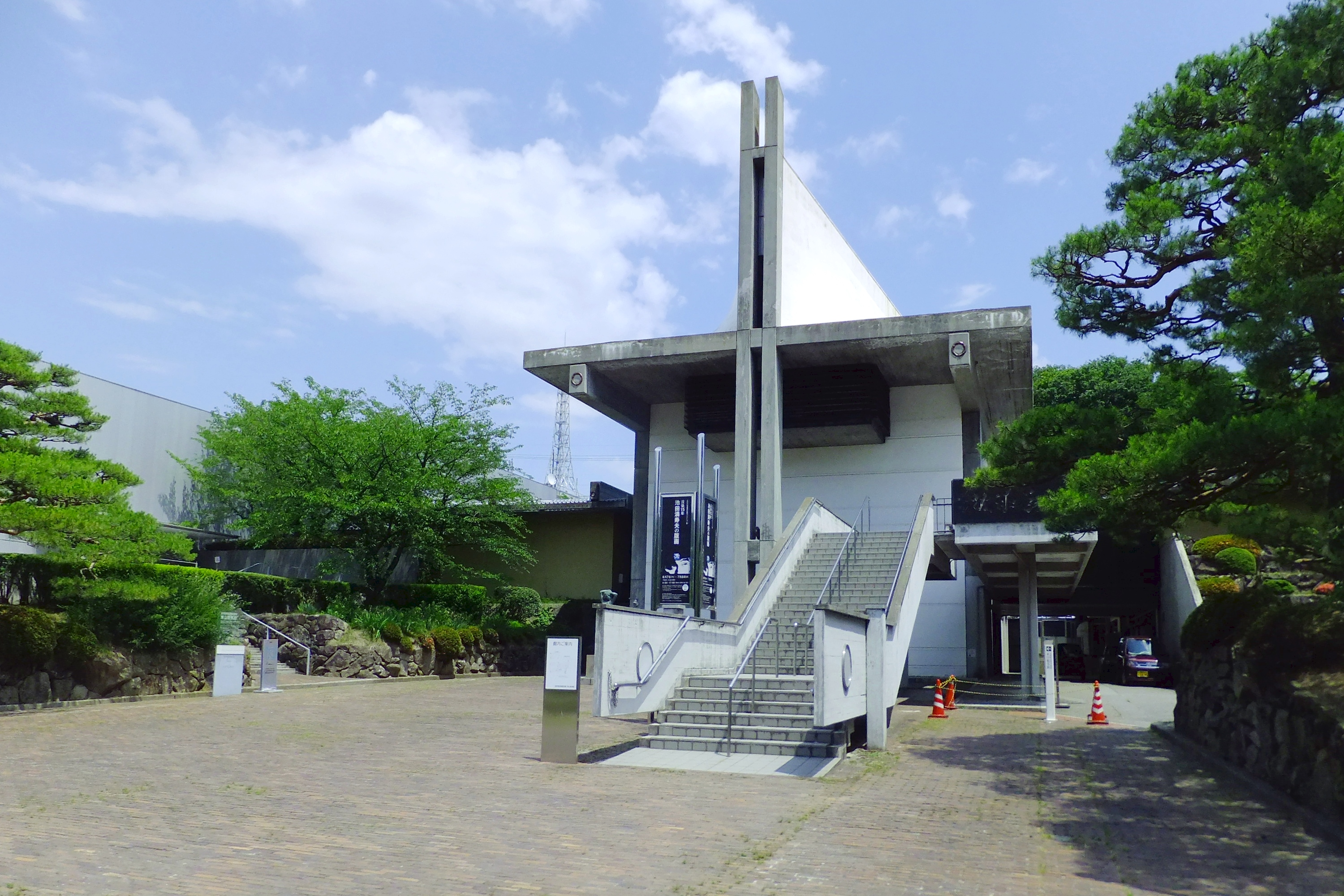
- Interactive map of the Nagano Prefectural Shinano Art Museum area

General information
- Location: 1-4-4 Hakoshimizu, Nagano, Nagano Prefecture, Japan
- Coordinates: 36°39′42″N 138°11′28″E
- Opened: 1 October 1966

Website
- Official website

Nagano Prefectural Shinano Art Museum (長野県信濃美術館, Nagano-ken Shinano Bijutsukan) opened as Shinano Art Museum in Jōyama Park (城山公園), Nagano, Nagano Prefecture, Japan in 1966, becoming a prefectural museum three years later. It is dedicated to the artists of, and works relating to, Shinshū, including paintings by Hishida Shunsō, Nakamura Fusetsu, and Fujishima Takeji. On 26 April 1990, the Higashiyama Kaii Gallery (東山魁夷館) opened as an annex; currently, there are more than 970 works by the artist. After fifty years, in 2017, the complex closed for renewal, the Higashiyama Kaii Gallery reopening in 2019, the Art Museum scheduled to reopen in April 2021.

== See also ==
- Zenkō-ji
- Nagano Prefectural Museum of History
- Shinano Province
