= Kikuchi Yōsai =

Japanese painter (1788–1878)

- 菊池 容斎
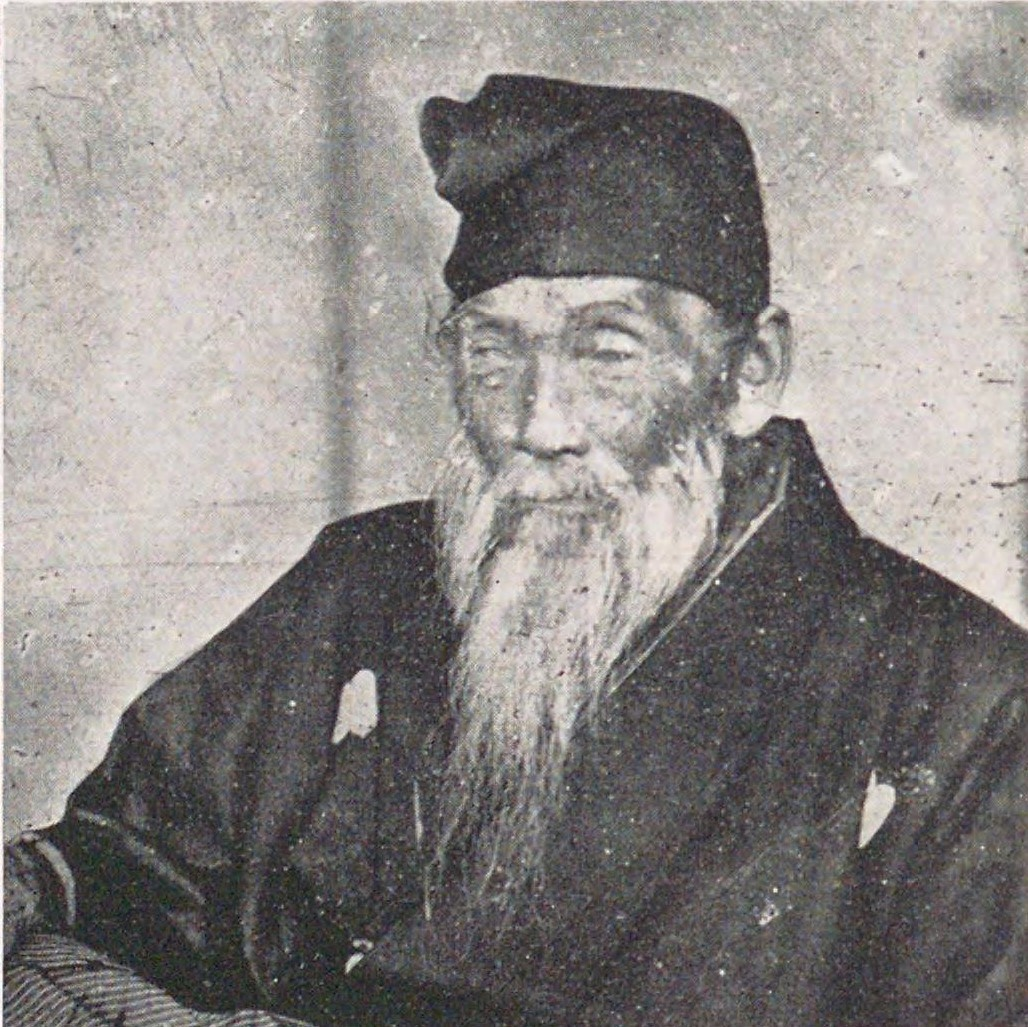
- Born: Kawahara Takeyasu (河原 武保); 28 November 1788
- Died: 16 June 1878 (aged 89)
- Occupation: Painter

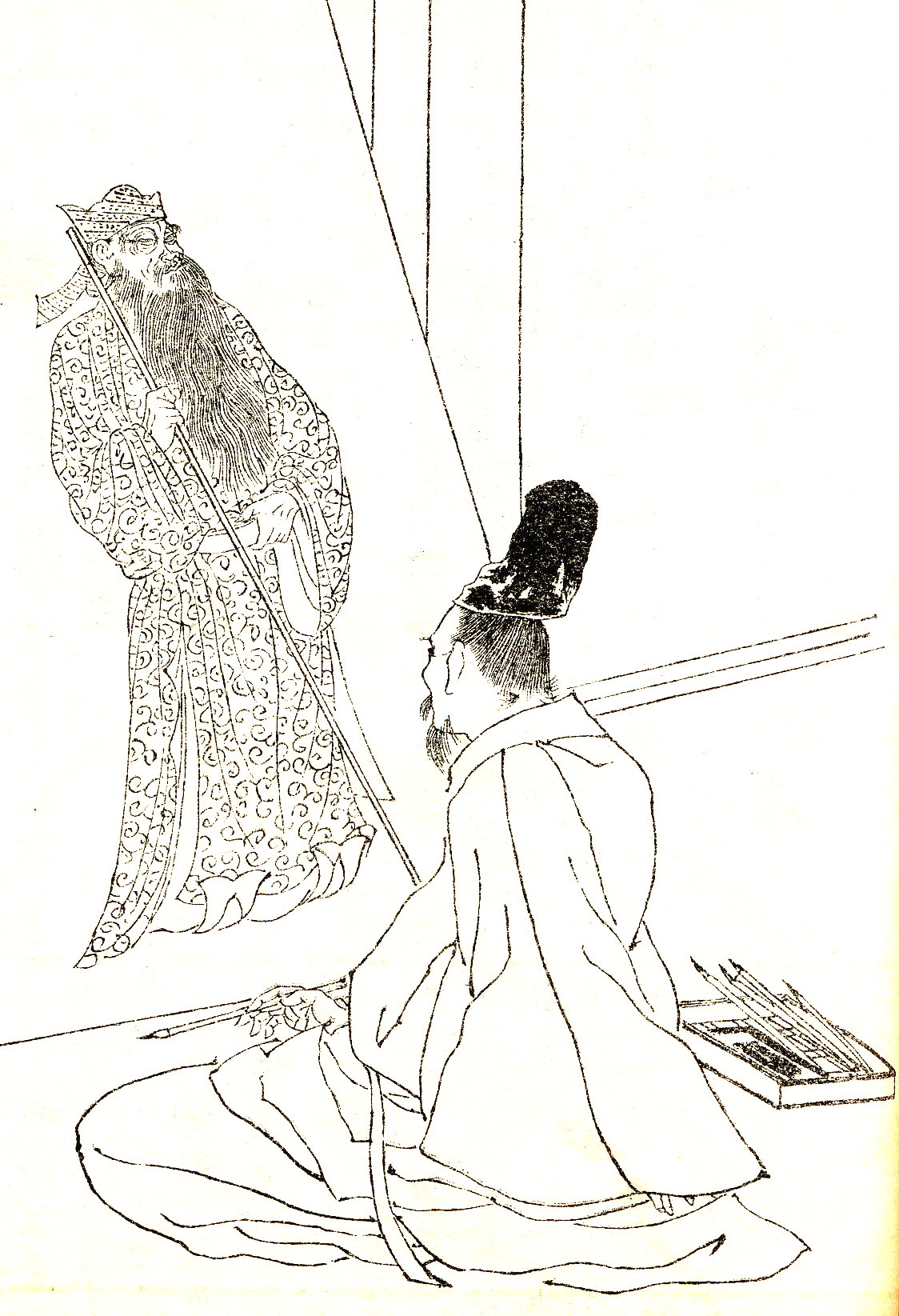
Kose Kanaoka (a 9th century painter) by Kikuchi Yōsai

Kikuchi Yōsai (菊池 容斎; November 28, 1788 – June 16, 1878), also known as Kikuchi Takeyasu and Kawahara Ryōhei, was a Japanese painter most famous for his monochrome portraits of historical figures.

== Biography ==
The son of a samurai named Kawahara of Edo, he was adopted by a family named Kikuchi. When eighteen, he became a pupil of Takata Enjō; but, after studying the principles of the Kanō, Shijō, and Maruyama schools, perhaps, under Ozui, a son of Ōkyo, he developed an independent style, having some affinities with that of Tani Bunchō.

His illustrated history of Japanese heroes, the Zenken Kojitsu, is a remarkable specimen of his skill as a draughtsman in monochrome ink. In order to produce this work, and his many other portraits of historical figures, he performed extensive historical, and even archaeological, research. Zenken Kojitsu features over 500 major figures in Japanese history, and was originally printed as a series of ten woodblock printed books, in 1878.

== Style ==
Nakane Kōtei (中根 香亭) pointed out that Yōsai modelled the form of Zenken Kojitsu (前賢故実) on Wanxiaotang Zhuzhuang Huachuan (晩笑堂竹荘画伝) which was drawn by the Qing illustrator Shangguan Zhou. Kōtei also said that Yōsai was influenced by Hokusai when young. He thought of the calligraphy as much as the picture when he guided a pupil.
