= Kikuchi Keigetsu =

- 菊池契月
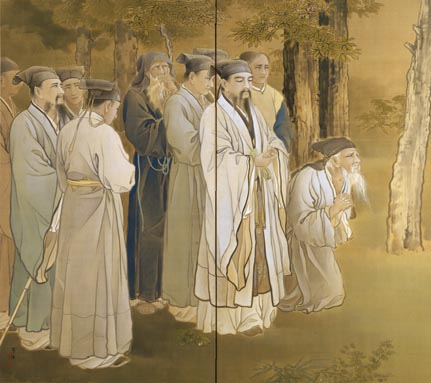
- Lamenting over the Tomb of a Sage (1908) (National Museum of Modern Art, Tokyo)
- Born: 14 November 1879; Nagano Prefecture, Japan
- Died: 9 September 1955 (aged 75); Kyoto
- Movement: Nihonga

Kikuchi Keigetsu (菊池契月) (14 November 1879 – 9 September 1955) was a Japanese Nihonga painter, member of the Japan Art Academy, Imperial Household Artist, and emeritus professor at the Kyoto City University of Arts. In 1922 he travelled to Europe, in particular England, France, and Italy, where he studied the traditions of western art as well as contemporary movements such as Fauvism and Cubism.

== See also ==
- Yōga
