= Morita Tsunetomo =

Japanese painter (1881–1933)

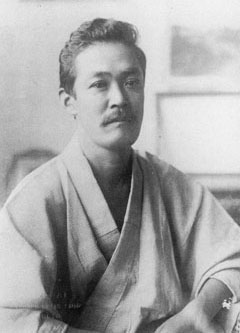
Morita Tsunetomo

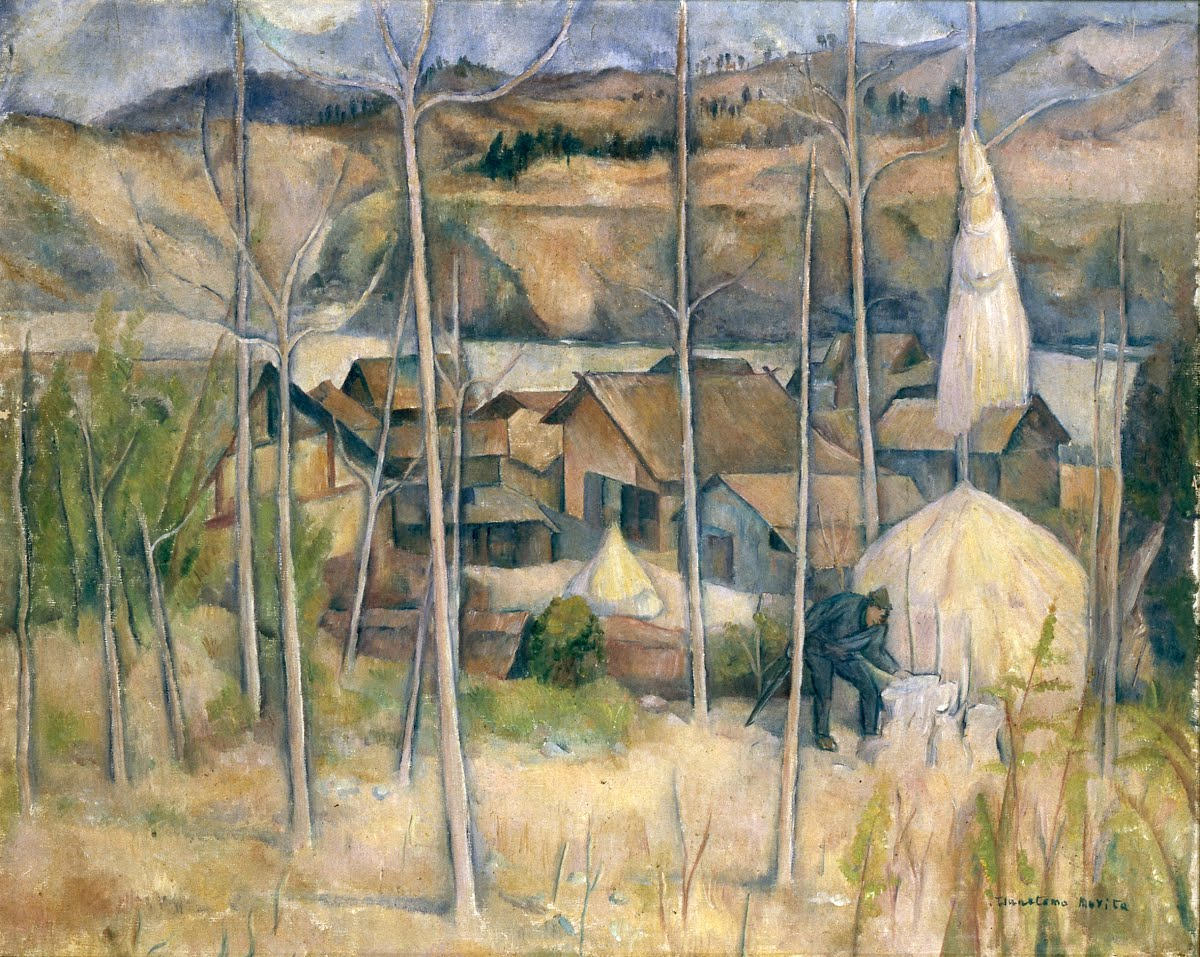
Scene in Aizu

Morita Tsunetomo (Japanese: 森田 恒友; born 9 April 1881, Tamai, now part of Kumagaya – died 8 April 1933, Tokyo) was a Japanese painter in the yōga style; known primarily for landscapes.

== Life and work ==
At the age of 23, after a private education, he began his studies at the Tokyo Art School, the precursor of today's Geidai. His teachers there were Koyama Shōtarō and Nakamura Fusetsu. In 1907, one of his paintings was accepted for the First Exhibition of the Ministry of Culture. Together with Ishii Hakutei and Yamamoto Kanae, he published an art journal called Hōsun (方寸; roughly: Dimensions).

In 1914, he visited Paris and Brittany, where he came under the influence of modern French art; especially Paul Cézanne, before being compelled to return to Japan at the outbreak of World War I. In 1916, he joined the yōga department of Nihon Bijutsuin (visual arts academy). He was one of the founders of the Shunyo-kai art society (春陽会; roughly: Spring Association) in 1922. He became Director of the Western Painting Department at the new Imperial Art Academy (now Musashino Art University) in 1929.

Until he was fifty-one, he devoted himself exclusively to landscapes. During his last two years, he did ink drawings in a modified nihonga style.

He also wrote under the pseudonym "Heiya" (平野; roughly: Open Field). His works include an anthology of essays (平野雑筆) and a book of art instruction (恒友画壇), both published in 1934. The following year, Misai Kosugi published a book of Morita's art commentaries.

== Sources ==
- "Morita Tsunetomo". In: Hans Vollmer: Allgemeines Lexikon der bildenden Künstler des XX. Jahrhunderts. Vol.3: K–P. E. A. Seemann, Leipzig 1956, pg.424
