= Shunyo-kai art society =

Japanese art society

Shunyo-kai art society (Japanese: 春陽会, romanized: Shun'yōkai, lit. 'Spring Sun Society'), is a Japanese art society founded in 1922 by the Western-style (yōga) artists from the painting department of Nihon Bijutsuin (English: Japan Visual Arts Academy). As of 2021, they have some 200 members. They annually hold a large scale exhibition at the Tokyo Metropolitan Art Museum.

== History ==
The Shunyo-kai art society started in 1922, after a group of Nihon Bijutsuin art students rebelled against the lessons and wanted to focus on the Western-style (yōga). It emerged as the third yōga art society, and competed against the Teikoku Bijutsuin (the Imperial Fine Arts Academy), and the Nika Association. The founding group members from Nihon Bijutsuin include Gen’ichirō Adachi, Noboru Hasegawa, Yamamoto Kanae, Misai Kosugi, Hakuyō Kurata, Morita Tsunetomo, and Ryūzaburō Umehara; and the founding guest members include Ishii Tsuruzō, Keishi Imazeki, Ryūsei Kishida, Shōhachi Kimura, Sadao Tsubaki, Kazumasa Nakagawa, Shōzō Yamazaki, and Tetsugorō Yorozu.

== See also ==
- List of Yōga painters
- Nihonga, a traditional Japanese art movement
