= Tetsugorō Yorozu =

Japanese artist

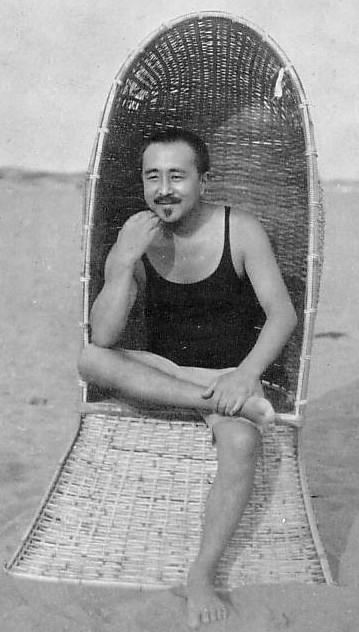
- Yorozu at Chigasaki, 1920s
- Born: November 17, 1885; Hanamaki, Iwate, Japan
- Died: May 1, 1927 (aged 41); Chigasaki, Kanagawa, Japan
- Known for: Painter,
- Movement: Yōga

Tetsugorō Yorozu (萬鉄五郎, Yorozu Tetsugorō; November 17, 1885 – May 1, 1927) was a Japanese painter, noted for his work in introducing the Avant-garde trend, especially cubism into Japanese yōga (Western-style) painting in the early 20th century.

== Biography ==
Yorozu was born in what is now part of Hanamaki, Iwate Prefecture in the Tōhoku region of northern.At that time, Yorozu's family was a landowner who ran agricultural and seafood products. Yorozu was the eldest son of the family. He developed an interest in painting at an early age.

=== Early artistic experience ===
In 1899, when Yorozu was 14 years old, Yorozu studied Japanese painting by himself. In 1901,16-year-old Yorozu based on what he read in Oshita Tojiro’s “A Guide to Watercolors”, taught himself to paint watercolors.

In 1903, he traveled to Tokyo with his cousin where he attended the Waseda Junior High School. Because Yorozu had a strong interest in painting, he joined painting clubs, participates in sketch meetings, etc., and often held watercolor painting exhibitions. In addition, Yorozu often visited the watercolor painter Kitaro Mano to receive criticism of his works. In 1904, Yorozu briefly studied Zen meditation. In 1905, 20-year-old Yorozu went to Kikuzaka Institute to receive artistic guidance. He began to attend the meetings of the Hakubakai art circle established by Kuroda Seiki. In 1906, Yorozu graduated from Waseda Middle School. He traveled to the United States as part of a Rinzai Zen mission, but with the intention of enrolling in an art school in San Francisco, but returned to Japan the same year due to the 1906 San Francisco earthquake. In 1907, he was admitted to the Western Art Department of the Tokyo Fine Arts School. At the same time, Yorozu entered the Department of Western Painting of the Tokyo Fine Arts School as an undergraduate and served as a monitor in the class.

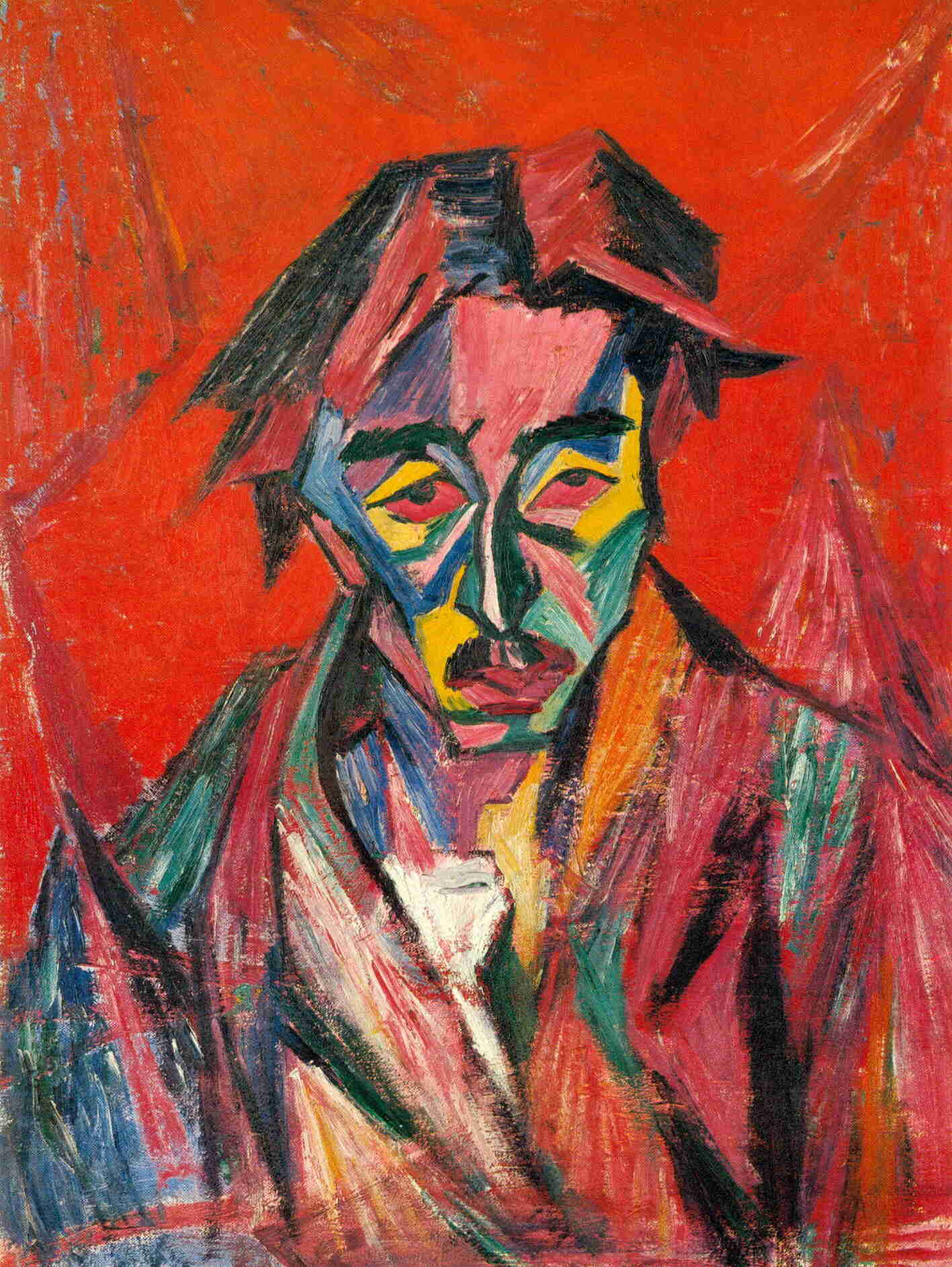
Self Portrait with Red Eyes, 1912

In 1910 he formed the Absinthe Group with his classmates Hirai Tamenari and Yamashita Tetsunosuke. In 1912, Yorozu graduated, with his graduation work, a Post-Impressionist piece bordering on Fauvism titled Nude Beauty, winning considerable critical acclaim. In the same year he participated in the Fyuzankai Exhibition with Saito Yori and Kishida Ryūsei, in which he displayed "Head of a Woman" (also known as "Woman with a Boa"). The society was disbanded the following year.

=== Mid-to-late career ===
From 1914-1916 Yorozu returned to Iwate Prefecture to apply himself to his paintings, supported largely by the earnings of his wife. He painted a variety of self-portraits, landscapes and still-life paintings, and experimented with the beginnings of cubism. And yorozu has been exhibited in many painting exhibitions. At the 4th Nika Exhibition held in 1917, he displayed "Leaning Woman" and "Still-life with a Brush Stand", which provoked wide critical acclaim. During this time he also displayed still-life works at exhibitions held by the Japan Art Academy and the Inten.

In 1919, he moved to Chigasaki, Kanagawa for health reasons. After displaying four of his works including "Town Looked Down through the Branches" at the 6th Nika Exhibition, he was selected as a member of the Nika Society. However, his "Three Bathers" was rejected for display at the Teiten Exhibition in 1921. In 1920, he participated in the establishment of the Fortieth Year Society(Japanese: 四十年社). In 1921, yorozu began to fascinated with Nanga. Yorozu participated as an invited member of the Shunyokai in 1922, and became a member of the Japan Watercolor Painting Association. In the same year, Yorozu began to contribute illustrations intermittently. Later, he participated in the establishment of the 1930 Society(Japanese: 一九三〇年協会). Many painters are influenced by the art of Yorozu. In 1924,Yorozu sprang up the Yorozu's Nude Wood Print Society (Japanese: 萬鐵五郎裸体十題木版画会). In 1926, as one of the Ars Art Series(Japanese: アルス美術叢書), the book 文晁(1926) was published. In 1923 he established the Enchokai together with Kobayashi Tokusaburo, Maeda Kanji, Hayashi Takeshi and Onchi Kashiro.

In 1927, Yorozu died at his home in Chigasaki at the age of 41, from tuberculosis. Many of his works are now displayed at the Yorozu Tetsugoro Museum, in his hometown of Hanamaki, Iwate.

== Noted works ==
Leaning Woman
- もたれて立つ人 (Japanese)
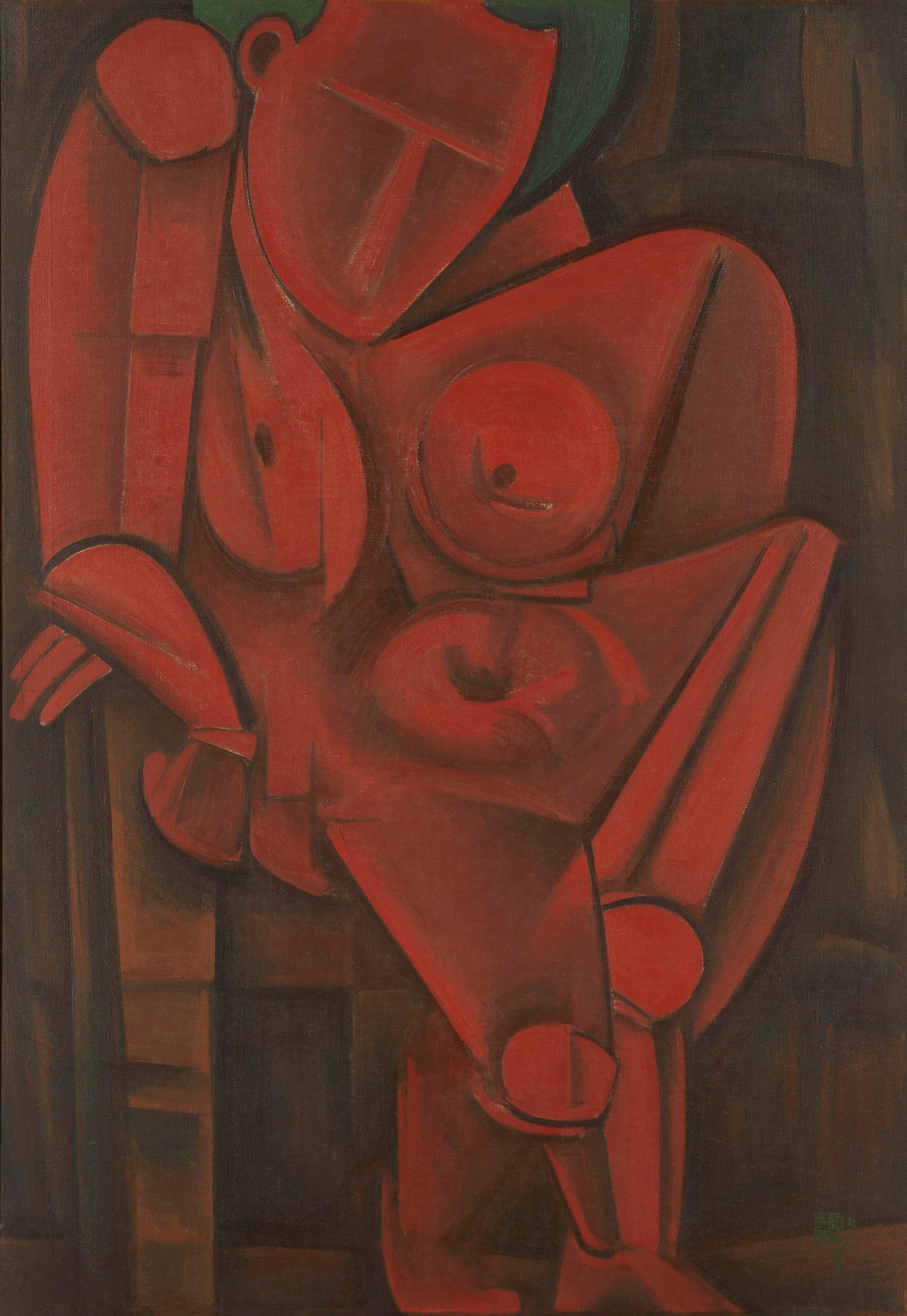
- Artist: Tetsugorō Yorozu
- Year: 1917
- Type: Oil painting
- Dimensions: 162.5 cm × 112.5 cm (64.0 in × 44.3 in)
- Location: National Museum of Modern Art, Tokyo, Tokyo

- Naked Beauty (裸体美人), 1912, National Museum of Modern Art, Tokyo, National Important Cultural Property
- Leaning Woman (もたれて立つ人), 1917, National Museum of Modern Art, Tokyo, National Important Cultural Property
- Self-Portrait with clouds (雲のある自画像), 1912–1913, Iwate Prefectural Museum
- Self-Portrait with red eyes (赤い目の自画像), 1912–1913, Iwate Prefectural Museum
- Self-Portrait without eyes (目のない自画像), 1915, Iwate Prefectural Museum
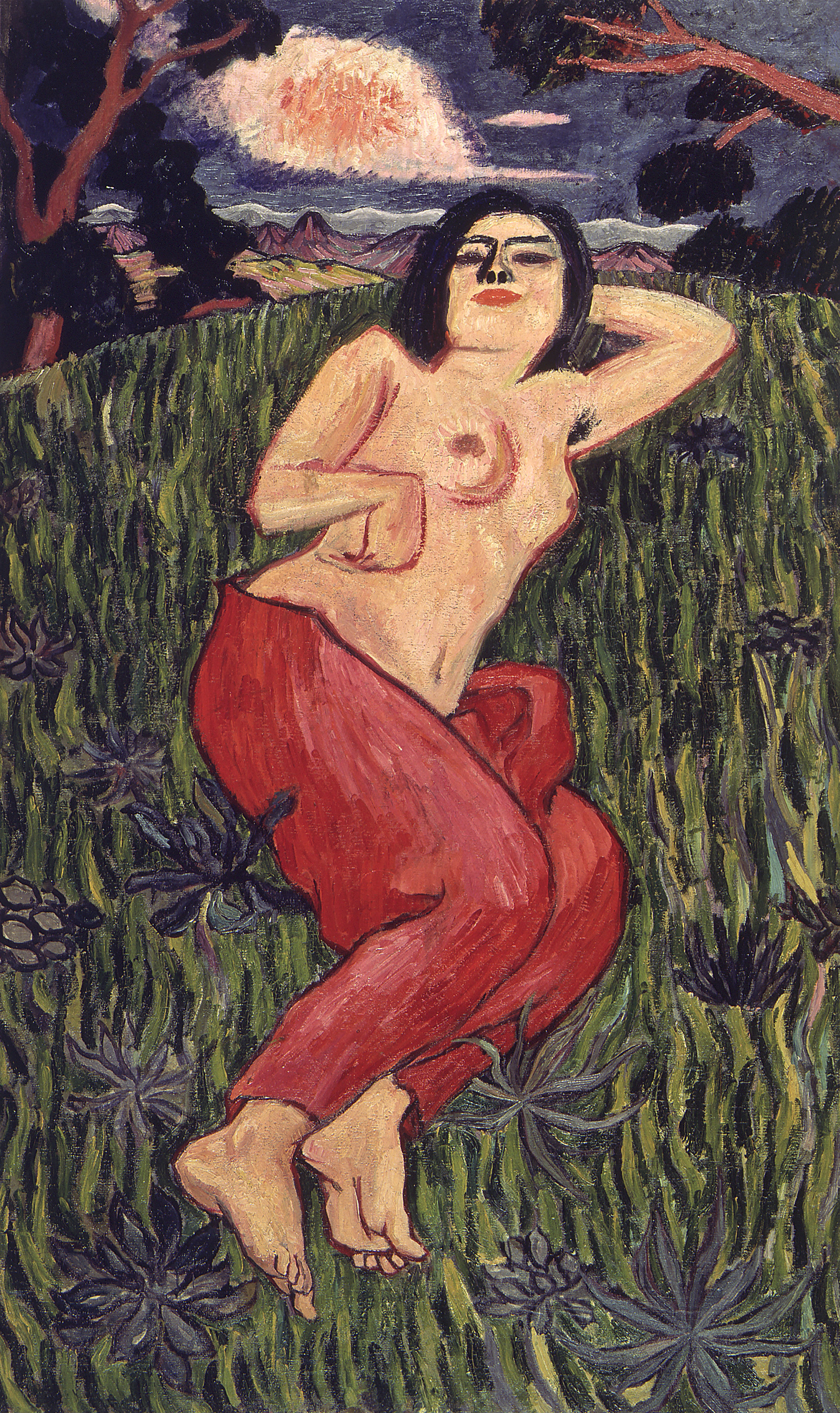
Year: 1912 Size: 162.0×97.0 cm Medium: oil on canvas Location: National Museum of Modern Art, Tokyo

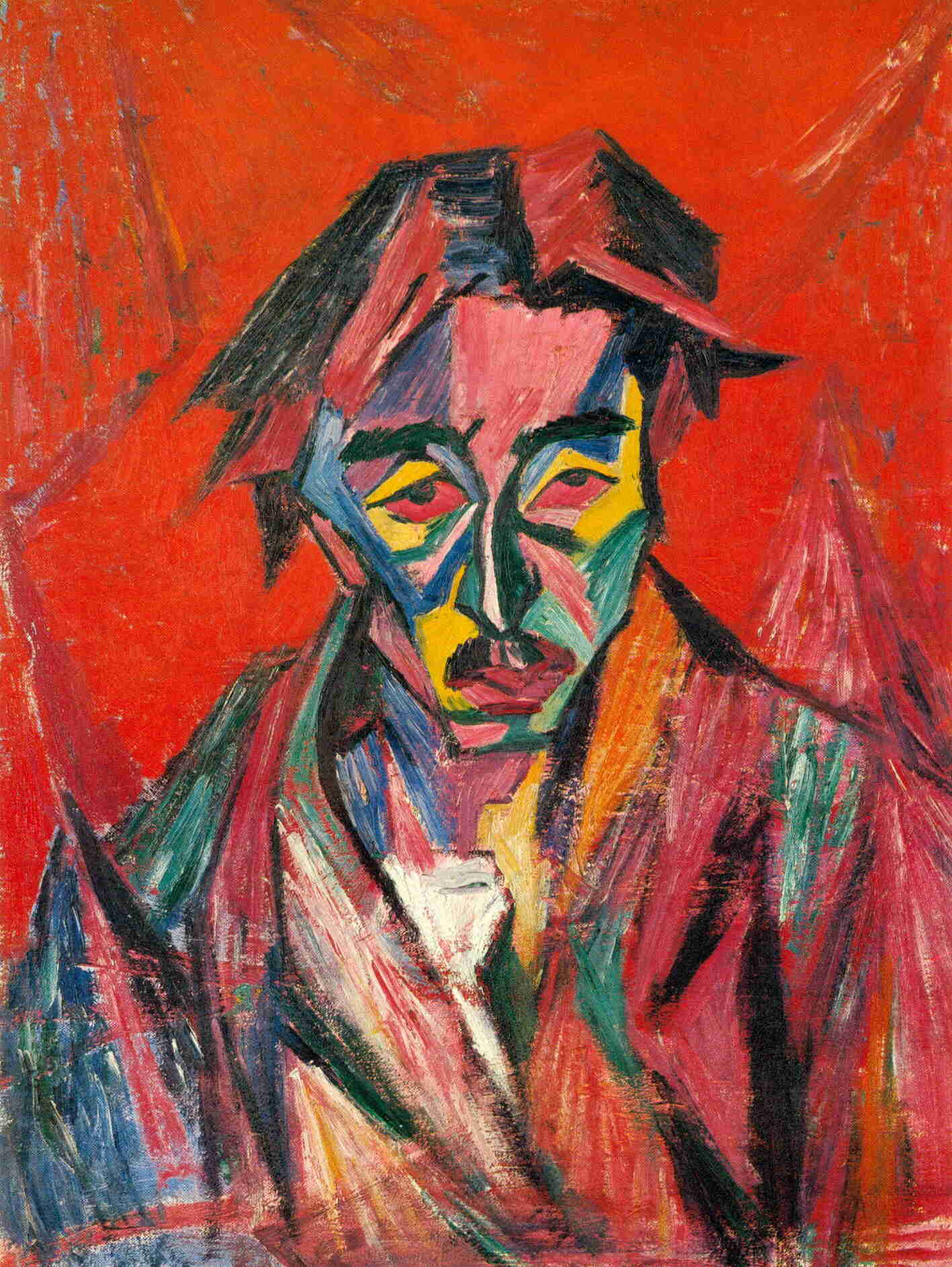
Self-Portrait with red eyes Year: 1912-1913 Size: 60.7×45.5 cmMedium: oil on canvas. Location: Iwate Prefectural Museum

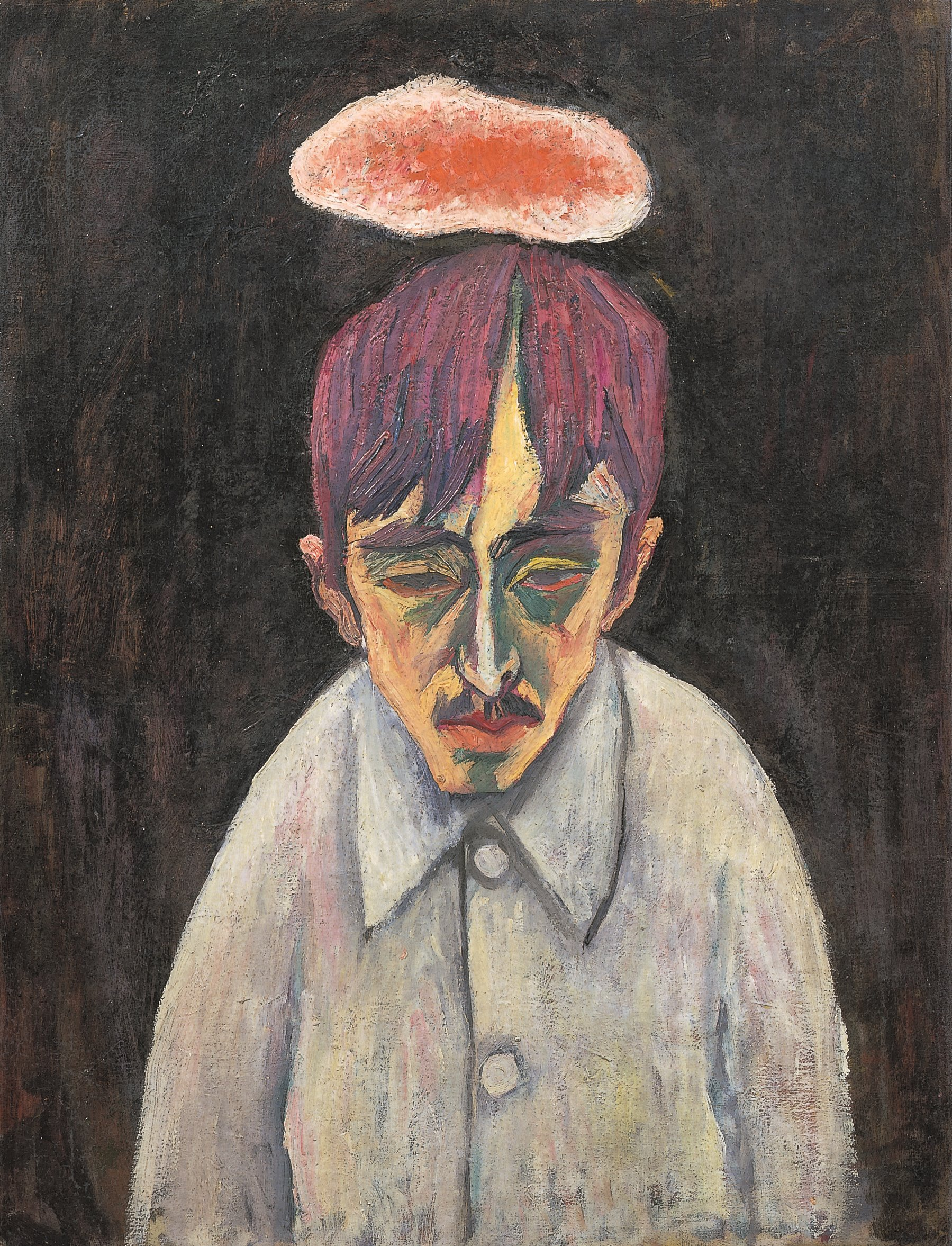
Self-Portrait with clouds Year: 1912-1913 Size: 59.5×45.5 cm Medium: oil on canvas. Location: Iwate Prefectural Museum

== Tetsugorō Yorozu's style change ==
=== Fauvist Period ===
(1912-1914)

Yorozu Tetsugoro's graduation work "Naked Beauty" from Tokyo Fine Arts School in 1912 (in the collection of the National Museum of Modern Art, Tokyo) It is now regarded as the first fauvist work in Japan.

=== Cubist Period ===
(1915-1918)

Yorozu Tetsugoro returned to his hometown Tsuchizawa, Iwate Prefecture. He left the circle of painters in Tokyo. In 1917, "Leaning Woman", which was painted intently, was the work of the Cubist Period.

=== Nanga Period ===
(1919-1927)

After Yorozu Tetsugoro moved to Chigasaki in 1919 because of illness, he became interested in the traditional "Nanga". "Nanga" is a general call of Japanese literati paintings established by Ike no Taiga, Yosa Buson, and Uragami Gyokudō, etc. in the Edo period.

== Tetsugorō Yorozu's Artistic Influences ==
Tetsugorō Yorozu's artistic creation was influenced by many artists, including some famous artists, such as Kuroda Seiki, Van Gogh, Matisse and Kandinsky. In the first semester of Tetsugorō Yorozu's first entry into Tokyo Art School, he liked Professor Kuroda Seiki's outdoor sketching style very much.And Yorozu studied plein air style from his professor Kuroda Seiki. This painting method realistically expresses the scenery, and at the same time, it is very clear, and also attaches great importance to the effect of sunlight and natural light. This realistic painting style influenced Tetsugorō Yorozu, who also began to paint with bright colors. In the senior year of college, around 1910, some new trends in Europe began to be introduced into Japan. Tetsugorō Yorozu soon became interested in these new artistic styles, and he also followed the trend. Yorozu immediately began to try to paint in subjective styles such as Post-Impressionism and Fauvism. Tetsugorō Yorozu himself once said that his graduation work Nude Beauty was influenced by Van Gogh and Matisse. In addition, his composition around 1918, Landscape through the Trees, was not only influenced by Cubism, but also clearly influenced by Kandinsky.
