= Misai Kosugi =

Japanese painter

- 小杉放庵
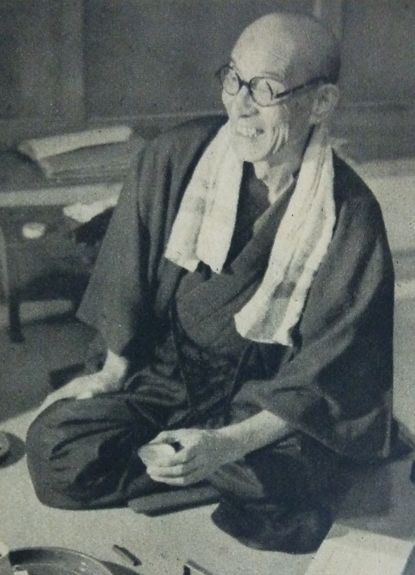
- Born: 30 December 1881; Nikkō, Japan
- Died: 16 April 1964 (aged 82); Myōkō, Japan
- Other name: Hōan Kosugi
- Occupation: Painter

Misei Hoan Kosugi (Japanese: 小杉放庵; 30 December 1881 – 16 April 1964) was a Japanese painter. He was associated with Western-style (yōga) art movement. Kosugi was a founding member of the Shunyo-kai art society in 1922, while attending Nihon Bijutsuin. His work was part of the painting event in the art competition at the 1932 Summer Olympics.
