= Nihon Bijutsuin =

Japanese non-governmental organization

Nihon Bijutsuin (日本美術院, lit. "Japan Visual Arts Academy") is a non-governmental artistic organization in Tokyo, Japan dedicated to Nihonga (Japanese style painting). The academy promotes the art of Nihonga through a biennial exhibition, the Inten Exhibition.

== History ==
The Nihon Bijutsuin was founded by Okakura Tenshin in 1898, together with a group of artists, including Hashimoto Gahō, Yokoyama Taikan, Shimomura Kanzan, Hishida Shunsō, Kawai Gyokudō, and several others, in response to Okakura being ousted from the Tokyo School of Fine Arts. Nihon Bijutsuin moved with Okakura to Izura, Ibaraki (now the city of Ibaraki) in 1906. However, Okakura was soon recruited by Ernest Fenollosa to assist in his efforts to introduce Chinese and Japanese arts to the western world via the Museum of Fine Arts, Boston, and soon lost interest in guiding the new organization. When Okakura died in 1913, the group dissolved.

Nihon Bijutsuin was resurrected a year later in 1914 under Yokoyama Taikan, who relocated it back to Yanaka, Tokyo. In 1920, separate sections were established for Japanese sculpture and for western-style (yōga painting), These separate sections were abolished in 1960, and currently the institute is currently devoted exclusively to Nihonga painting.

Nihon Bijutsuin should not be confused with the Japan Art Academy or the Japan Academy of Arts, which are different organizations.

== Inten exhibitions ==
The most important function of Nihon Bijutsuin is the organization and promotion of the inten (院展) biennial fine arts exhibitions. The Spring Exhibition is held in early April, for two weeks at the Mitsukoshi Department Store in Tokyo, followed by a tour around Japan for four months, at ten different locations. The sizes of the works which can be displayed is fixed at under 150 x 75 cm for rectangular works and under 106 x 106 cm for square works.

The Fall Exhibition is held in September for two weeks at the Tokyo Metropolitan Art Museum, followed by a year-long tour to 10 different locations around Japan. The Fall Exhibition contains larger works, with 225 x 180 cm as the upper limit.

== See also ==
- Japan Art Academy
