= Fujimura =

Fujimura (Japanese: 藤村) is a Japanese surname. Notable people with the surname include:

- Arihiro Fujimura (藤村 有弘; 1934–1982), Japanese actor and voice actor
- Ayumi Fujimura (藤村 歩; born 1982), Japanese voice actress
- Daisuke Fujimura (藤村 大介; born 1989), Japanese baseball player
- Fumio Fujimura (藤村 富美男; 1916–1992), Japanese baseball player
- Kazu Fujimura (藤村 佳津; born 1955), Japanese swimmer
- Makoto Fujimura (born 1960), American artist
- Mihoko Fujimura (藤村 実穂子; born 1966), Japanese operatic mezzo-soprano
- Miki Fujimura (藤村 美樹; born 1956), Japanese singer
- Misao Fujimura (藤村 操; 1886–1903), Japanese philosophy student and poet
- Osamu Fujimura (scientist) (born 1927), Japanese scientist
- Osamu Fujimura (藤村 修; born 1949), Japanese politician
- Shiho Fujimura (藤村 志保; born 1939), Japanese actress
- Shinichi Fujimura (藤村 新一; born 1950), Japanese amateur archaeologist and hoaxer
- Shoko Fujimura (藤村 祥子; born 1987), Japanese speed skater
- Shunji Fujimura (藤村 俊二; born 1934), Japanese actor
- Tsutomu Fujimura (藤村 勉; born 1982), Japanese sport wrestler

== Fictional characters ==
- Taiga Fujimura (藤村 大河), a character in the visual novel Fate/stay night
