= Makoto Fujimura =

American painter

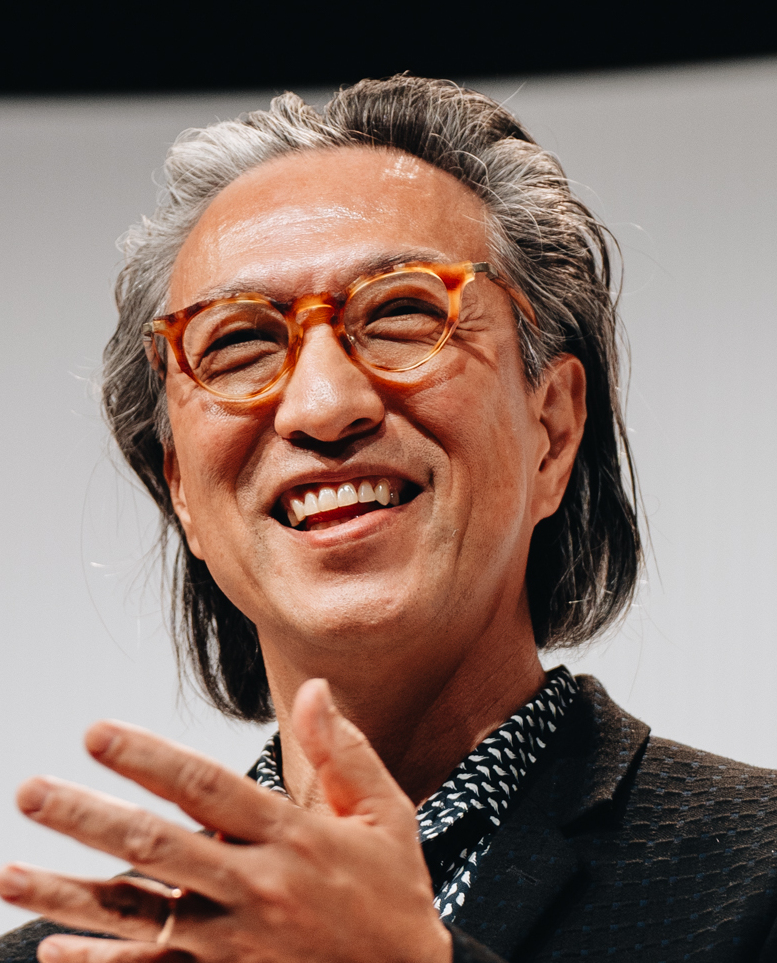
- Fujimura in London, November 2023
- Born: Boston, Massachusetts, US
- Education: Bucknell University; Tokyo University of the Arts
- Occupations: Artist; writer
- Parent: Osamu Fujimura
- Website: makotofujimura.com

Makoto Fujimura is an American artist. He is considered to be one of the leading figures of the "slow art" movement. He has coined the terms "Culture Care" and "Theology of Making". He graduated with a Bachelor of Arts degree from Bucknell University, then studied in a traditional Japanese painting doctorate program for several years at Tokyo University of the Arts with several notable artists such as Takashi Murakami and Hiroshi Senju. His bicultural arts education led his style towards a fusion between contemplative art and expressionism, using the traditional materials of Japanese art of Nihonga. His art is significantly influenced by Sen no Rikyū.

== Early life and education ==
=== Early life ===
Fujimura was born in Boston, Massachusetts. Both of his parents were of Japanese descent and after Fujimura was born, they returned to Japan, where Fujimura spent most of his childhood. His father was Osamu Fujimura, one of the pioneers of speech science.

When he was 13 years old, his family came back to the United States.

=== Education ===
Fujimura graduated cum laude from Bucknell University in 1983 with a double major in animal behavior and art and a minor in creative writing. Fujimura went on to study traditional Japanese painting at the Tokyo University of the Arts under a Nihonga Master Kazuho Hieda. He received his Master of Fine Arts degree in 1989. He was invited back to the Tokyo University of the Arts to continue his education in a lineage doctoral-level program in Nihonga, an ancient Japanese painting style, under Nihonga Master Matazō Kayama. He was the first non-Japanese citizen to be accepted in the Japanese painting doctorate program, which dates back to the 15th century.

== Work ==
=== Paintings ===
Fujimura's works have been exhibited in major museums and galleries around the world, including the U.S., Japan, Taiwan, Israel, the U.K., China, and Hong Kong. In 1992, at the age of 32, Fujimura became the youngest artist ever to have a piece acquired by the Museum of Contemporary Art in Tokyo.

His work includes "Ki-seki", "Water Flames", "Walking on Water", "Silence", "Columbines", "Golden Sea", "Four Holy Gospels", "Rhapsody", and "Sea Beyond", a collection of paintings using pulverized precious minerals, including gold, platinum, silver, azurite, malachite and cinnabar.

He has collaborated with Susie Ibarra on multiple occasions, and his live painting in 2009 was recorded by Plywood Pictures in "Live in New York: Susie Ibarra + Makoto Fujimura"; his live painting in 2021 was documented by Windrider Productions.

In November 2009, Fujimura's works were coupled with works of Georges Rouault at Dillon Gallery. Fujimura created several new works in homage to the 20th-century master. His "Twin Rivers of Tamagawa" (Collection of Tokyo University of Art Museum) was included in the Panasonic Museum exhibit "Rouault and Japan" in 2020.

In 2023, Fujimura's exhibition, "A Gaze Traverses Time and Space: Dialogue between Makoto Fujimura and Chinese Ancient Porcelain", at C3M Museum on the Bund in Shanghai, China, featured 17 paintings by Fujimura and 13 pieces of Chinese imperial porcelain.

In October 2023, Fujimura opened an exhibit of his paintings titled "My Bright Abyss: Paintings and Prints" at the Bradford Gallery at St. George's Episcopal Church in Nashville, TN in partnership with Covenant Presbyterian Church (Nashville) and Liturgy Collective.

In 2011, Fujimura founded the Fujimura Institute in honor of his father Osamu Fujimura, a scientist. As the first project, the Fujimura Institute launched the Qu4rtets, a collaboration between Fujimura, painter Bruce Herman, Duke theologian/pianist Jeremy Begbie, and Yale composer Christopher Theofanidis, based on T. S. Eliot's Four Quartets. The exhibition travelled to Baylor University, Duke University, and Yale University, Hong Kong University, Cambridge University, Gordon College, Roanoke College, and other institutions around the globe. The Qu4rtets became the first contemporary art exhibited at the historic King's Chapel in Cambridge, UK, for the Easter of 2015, and was exhibited in Hiroshima for the 70th anniversary of the atomic bombings in November 2015.

He is represented in Asia by Artrue International. His works are in permanent collection at the National Modern Museum of Art in Tokyo, Yokohama Museum of Art, Tokyo University of the Arts Museum, the Saint Louis Museum, the Cincinnati Museum, and the CNN building in Hong Kong, and other museums globally. Tikotin Museum in Israel hosted a solo exhibit in 2018 curated by James Elaine.

In 2009, Crossway Publishing commissioned Fujimura for The Four Holy Gospels project to commemorate the 400th anniversary of the publishing of the King James Bible. It was the first time that a single artist had been commissioned to illuminate the four Gospels in nearly five hundred years. The Four Holy Gospels consist of five major frontispieces, 89 chapter heading letters and over 140 pages of hand illumined pages, all done in traditional Nihonga. The Gospels were on exhibition at the Museum of Biblical Art in Manhattan, and were on display in Takashimaya, Nihonbashi, Tokyo in 2011. The Four Holy Gospels original art were exhibited in "Four Holy Gospels Chapel" at the Museum of the Bible in Washington, D.C. in 2018.

=== Writing, appearances and speeches ===
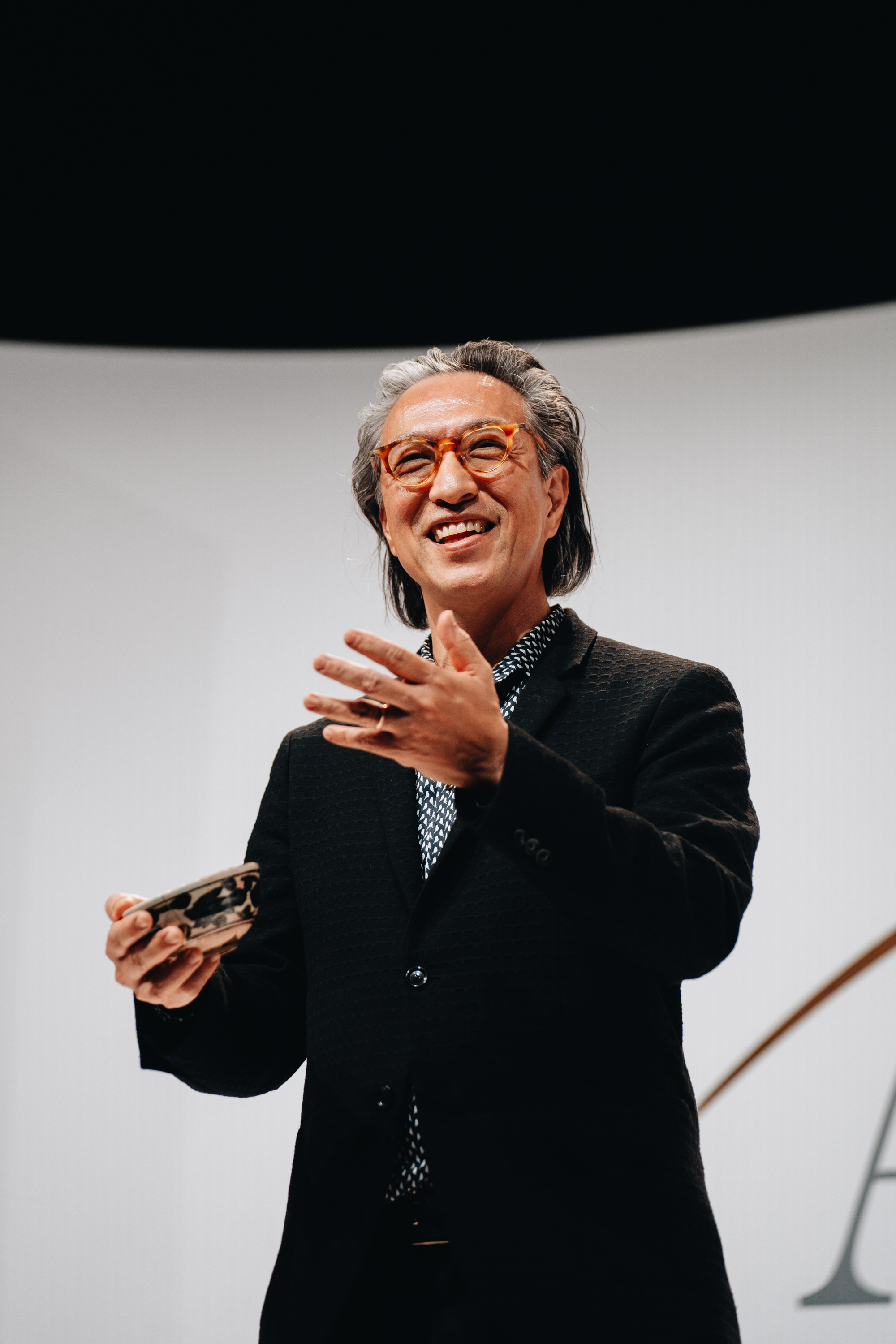
Makoto Fujimura explains kintsugi ceramic art during a speech at the Alliance for Responsible Citizenship, London, November 2023.

Fujimura is an author of several books including Art+Faith: A Theology of Making (Yale U. Press, 2021), Refractions: A Journey of Faith, Art and Culture (NavPress, 2009), and Culture Care (IVPress, 2020). In 2016, Fujimura released Silence and Beauty: Hidden Faith Born of Suffering (IVPress), an autobiographical journey into Shūsaku Endō's Silence.

His public speaking has made the artist notable outside of artistic circles. Fujimura has given at least five Commencement Addresses, including Judson University address "Kintsugi Generation". His 2011 Commencement Address at Belhaven University has been selected by NPR as one of the "Top 200 Commencement Addresses Ever", and in 2021 by CNN as one of 16 top addresses, "From Obama to Steve Jobs: The greatest commencement speeches of all time". He also appeared at the inaugural Alliance for Responsible Citizenship in London in late 2023, speaking on kintsugi, abstract art, and his cultural vision for the world.

Fujimura was featured in PBS's American Masters episode "Rothko: Pictures Must Be Miraculous" (2019) as the only living artist commenting on Mark Rothko's paintings. In 2023, upon request by Christopher Rothko, Fujimura wrote the afterword for republication of The Artist's Reality: Philosophies of Art (Yale U. Press, 2023), a collection of writings by Mark Rothko.

=== Film ===
Fujimura served as a special advisor to the major motion picture Silence (2016) by Martin Scorsese based on Shusaku Endō's Silence.

In 2010, Fujimura made his on-screen debut with commentary in the documentary The Human Experience. His mid-career retrospective catalogue Golden Sea (Dillon Gallery Press) was released in 2013 with essays by Daniel Siedell, Roberta Ahmanson, Nicolas Wolterstorff, and others. Golden Sea includes a full documentary of the same title by Plywood Pictures.

In 2017, Fujimura served as an executive producer of a short film Abstraction: Dianne Collard Story, a finalist at the Heartland Film Festival.

=== Career ===
In 1991, Fujimura founded IAMCultureCare, formerly known as the International Arts Movement. He has co-hosted several major conferences for the International Arts Movement, including Culture Care Summit (February 8–12, 2017, at Fuller Theological Seminary).

He has lectured at U.K. Parliament, Stockholm School of Economics, the Aspen Institute, Hong Kong University, Bucknell University, Cairn University, Gordon College, Grove City College, The King's College, Princeton University, Yale University, and has been a keynote speaker in various arts, academic and business conferences.

From September 2015 to January 2020, Fujimura was the Vision Director of the Brehm Center for Worship, Theology, and the Arts at Fuller Theological Seminary.

== Recognition ==
Fujimura is a recipient of 2014 American Academy of Religion's Religion and Arts Award. He is also a senior fellow at the Trinity Forum.

Fujimura received 2016 Aldersgate Prize, which "celebrates the outstanding achievement of an author whose scholarly inquiry challenges reductionistic trends in academia by yielding a broad, integrative analysis of life's complexities and shedding fresh light on ultimate questions that enliven Christian conceptions of human flourishing", for his Silence and Beauty book on Shūsaku Endō.

Fujimura was the 2023 Kuyper Prize for Excellence in Reformed Theology and Public Life. He was the first artist to receive this award in 25 years.

Bucknell University honored him with the Outstanding Alumni Award in 2012.

Fujimura is a recipient of four honorary Doctoral degrees, from Belhaven University in 2011, Biola University in 2012, Cairn University in 2014, and Roanoke College in 2015.

Fujimura was appointed by U.S. President George W. Bush to the National Council on the Arts in 2003.

== Personal life ==
Fujimura's journey of faith is recounted in his book Silence and Beauty. When he was in Japan studying traditional methods in Japanese art, Fujimura was searching for a deeper meaning and purpose in life, but he did not find satisfaction, thinking the Bible's teachings were not applicable for the modern world. It was not until he read the poems of William Blake, where he found new meaning in Christianity and began his journey of his newfound faith. Since then, he has intertwined his artwork with his faith. Afterwards, he wanted to help other artists and creative people alike who struggle with their art and faith, and it became the organization called the International Arts Movement, now IAMCultureCare. Fujimura is a Reformed Christian.

Fujimura is married to Haejin Shim Fujimura, a lawyer, entrepreneur, and nonprofit leader.

== Bibliography ==
- Art+Faith: A Theology of Making (Yale University Press, 2021) (foreword by N. T. Wright)
- Silence and Beauty (IVPress, 2016, Sho-Bunsha in Japan, 2017) – Aldersgate Award Winner
- Culture Care (Fujimura Institute, 2014, republished by IVPress, 2017)
- "The Aroma of the New" (Books & Culture, 2011)
- "Fallen Towers and the Art of Tea" (2009)
- Refractions: A Journey of Art, Faith and Culture (NavPress, 2009)
- "Withoutside: Transgressing in Love", Image Journal, "Twentieth Anniversary Issue: Fully Human", Number 60 (2008)
- "A Letter to a Young Artist", Scribbling in the Sand, Michael Card, InterVarsity Press (2002)
- "Fallen Towers and the Art of Tea", Image Journal, Number 32 (2001)
- "An Exception to Gravity – On Life and Art of Jackson Pollock", Regeneration Quarterly, Volume 7, Number 3 (2001)
- "River Grace", Image Journal, Number 22 (1999)
- "That Final Dance", It Was Good: Making Art to the Glory of God, edited by Ned Bustard, Square Halo Press (2000)

== Other References ==
- June 23, Shane Blackshear on; 2016. "Seminary Dropout 130: Makoto Fujimura, Author of Silence and Beauty: Hidden Faith Born of Suffering". Missio Alliance. Retrieved 2019-03-05.
- "Makoto Fujimura | Bio". www.makotofujimura.com. Retrieved 2019-03-05.
- Risdon, Nate. "Faculty & Staff". Brehm Center. Retrieved 2019-03-05.
- "Makoto Fujimura". Image Journal. Retrieved 2019-03-05.
- "Makoto Fujimura Awarded 2016 Aldersgate Prize for "Silence and Beauty"". www.indwes.edu. Retrieved 2019-03-05.
- Forum, The Trinity (2015-06-02), Evening Conversation with Makoto Fujimura, retrieved 2019-03-05
- Glaspey, Terry. 75 Masterpieces Every Christian Should Know. Baker Books, 2015.
