= Ryūshi =

- Gender: Male

Origin
- Origin: Japanese
- Meaning: Different meanings depending on the kanji used

Ryūshi, Ryushi or Ryuushi (written: 龍志 or 龍子) is a masculine Japanese given name. Notable people with the name include:

- Kawabata Ryūshi (川端 龍子; 1885–1966), Japanese painter
- Ryūshi Yanagisawa (柳澤 龍志; born 1972), Japanese professional wrestler, mixed martial artist and kickboxer

== See also ==
- Ryushi, a planet in the Alien vs. Predator franchise
