= Shikō Imamura =

Japanese artist (1880–1916)

Shikō Imamura (今村 紫紅, Imamura Shikō; 1880–1916) was a Japanese artist whose work is featured at the Yokohama Museum of Art.

He was regarded of one of the fathers of New Nihonga, and is known for he quote to his students "I break the Old Nihonga, You should follow me and build New Nihonga."

== See also ==
- Gyoshū Hayami
