= Senju =

Senju is a Japanese surname.

People with the surname include:

- Akira Senju (born 1960), a Japanese composer, arranger and conductor
- Hiroshi Senju (born 1958), a Japanese painter
- Miyazono Senju IV (1899–1985), a Japanese singer and shamisen player

== Fictional characters ==
- Hashirama Senju, a character in the manga and anime series Naruto
- Tobirama Senju, a character from the manga and anime series Naruto
- Tsunade Senju, a character from the manga and anime series Naruto

== See also ==
- Kita-Senju Station, in Tokyo
- Minami-Senju Station, in Tokyo
- Senju-ji, a Buddhist temple
- Senju Thermal Power Station, in Tokyo
