= Kiyoshi Hasegawa =

Kiyoshi Hasegawa may refer to:

- Kiyoshi Hasegawa (admiral) (1883–1970), Japanese admiral and former Governor of Taiwan
- Kiyoshi Hasegawa (artist) (1891–1980), Japanese artist and engraver
- Kiyoshi Hasegawa (songwriter), Japanese songwriter and guitarist; see Tokiko Kato
