= Yamatane Museum =

Japanese art museum

Coordinates: 35.6532°N 139.7137°E

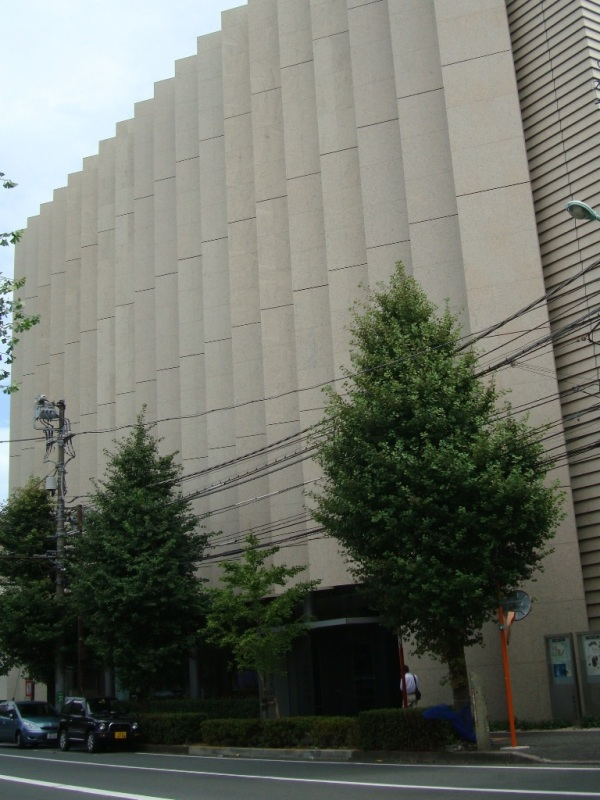
Exterior of the museum

The Yamatane Museum of Art (山種美術館, Yamatane Bijutsukan) is a museum in Japan specializing in the nihonga style of Japanese watercolour painting. It is run by the Yamatane Art Foundation. The museum holds 7-8 exhibitions per year.

The Yamatane museum was opened in 1966 by the Yamatane art foundation, an organization based on the personal collection of Yamazaki Taneji and the corporate collection of Yamatane securities (now SMBC Friend Securities). There is a long-term exhibition of lesser works, with periodic displays organized. The foundation organizes moving exhibitions of works in their possession. The museum owns famous nihonga paintings including some with "object of national cultural significance" status. The quality of their collection is very high.

The museum's collection of over 1,800 works is centered on modern and contemporary nihonga from the Meiji period on. It also includes classic calligraphy, early modern paintings, ukiyo-e, and Western-style paintings. Works that have been designated Important Cultural Properties, six in total, are Court Ladies Enjoying Wayside Chrysanthemums by Iwasa Matabei (1578-1650), View of Mt. Kunō, by Tsubaki Chinzan (1801-1854), Tabby Cat, by Takeuchi Seihō (1864-1942), Nude, by Murakami Kagaku (1888-1939), Dancing in the Flames and Camellia Petals Scattering by Hayami Gyoshū (1894-1934). They are joined by Important Art Objects (ja) such as Autumn Plants and Quails by Sakai Hōitsu (1761-1828). In addition to 120 paintings by Hayami Gyoshū and seventy by Kawai Gyokudō (1873-1957), the Yamatane collection is also known for its 135 works by Togyū Okumura (1889-1990), including the majority of the paintings he showed in the postwar Inten (Japan Art Institute Exhibition), such as Maelstroms at Naruto and Cherry Blossoms at Daigo-ji Temple. The collection also numbers works by artists who must be included in any discussion of modern nihonga, including Sakuemon's House and Divine Spirit: Mt. Fuji, by Yokoyama Taikan (1868-1958), Ancient Pine Tree and White Wisterias, by Shimomura Kanzan (1873-1930), Scene from the Noh Play Kinuta, by Uemura Shōen (1875-1949), Agalloch Pillow, by Kaburaki Kiyokata (1878-1972), Scenes from the Legend of Kiyohime, a set of eight paintings by Kobayashi Kokei (1883-1957), Oda Nobunaga Dancing before His Departure for the Front, by Yasuda Yukihiko (1884-1978), Yoshida Shōin in Rendai-ji Temple near Shimoda, by Maeda Seison (1885-1977), Maelstroms at Naruto, by Kawabata Ryūshi (1885-1966), and End of the Year, by Higashiyama Kaii (1908-1999).

== Publications ==
The museum has published a number of books about its collection and exhibitions, including the following:

- Uemura Shōen and Splendid Women (2025)
- The Japanese Art of Happiness: from Itō Jakuchū to Yokohama Taikan and Kawabata Ryūshi (2024)
- Nihonga Award: Meet the future of Nihonga - SEED 2024 (2024)
- Are You a Dog Person or a Cat Person? - From Tawaraya Sōtatsu, Takeuchi Seihō, and Léonard Tsuguharu Foujita to Yamaguchi Akira (2024)
- Special 50th Memorial Exhibition: Fukuda Heihachirō x The Rimpa School (2024)
- Masterpieces of Kobayashi Kokei from the Yamatane Collection (2023)
- Masterpieces from Takeuchi Seihō from the Yamatane Collection (2022)
- Masterpieces of Hayaki Gyoshū from the Yamatane Collection (2019)
- Masterpieces depicting cherry trees and blossoms from the Yamatane Collection (2018)
- Art Associated with the Imperial Family: Artists who Decorated the Imperial Palaces (2018)
- Masterpieces of Yokohama Taikan from the Yamatane Collection (2018)
- Flowers: Masterpieces of Floral Paintings from the Yamatane Collection (2017)
- Kawai Gyokudō: Seasons, People, Nature (2017)
- Masterpieces of Ukiyo-e from the Yamatane Collection (2016)
- Nihonga Award: Meet the future of Nihonga - SEED 2016 (2016)
- 100 Masterpieces of Modern Japanese Paintings Selected from the Yamatane Collection (2016)
- Murakami Kagaku and Kyoto Artists (2015)
- Masterpieces of Okumura Togyū from the Yamatane Collection (2010)
