= Senju Thermal Power Station =

Power plant

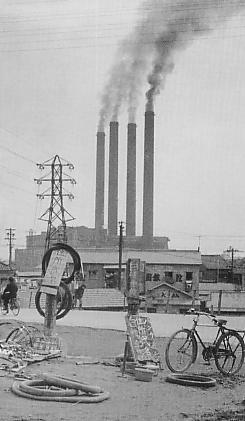
Senju Thermal Power Station

The Senju Thermal Power Station (千住火力発電所) was a power plant in Tokyo that existed on the banks of the Sumida River from 1926 to 1963. The plant is still somewhat famous in Japan because of its "Ghost Chimneys", which became a symbol of the area and were often featured in Japanese movies and books of the time. The power station's address was 35 Senju Sakuragi, Adachi Ward, Tokyo (now gone). There was also a power plant by the same name along the banks of the same Sumida River in North Toshima, South Senju from 1905 to 1917.

== History ==
The first Senju thermal power station was constructed by Tokyo Lighting, which would become the predecessor to Tokyo Electric Power, in North Toshima, South Senju (in the vicinity of what is now South Senju's 2nd middle school in Arakawa Ward) alongside the expansion of the Asakusa thermal power plant to deal with increased demand for power in 1905 (Meiji 38). It was a high capacity thermal power plant equipped with a steam turbine for a motor that was cutting-edge technology for the time.

The plant was initially designed to have 10,000 horsepower, but due to a sudden rise in the price of charcoal and the attention given to the construction of the hydroelectric plant (Komabashi hydroelectric plant), it was reduced to 5,000 horsepower. The first Senju thermal power station was done away with in January, 1917 (Taisho 6) amidst the rush of hydroelectric power plants being built in Komahashi, Yatsusawa, and Inawashiro.

After the first World War Japan's power plants entered an era of combined thermal and hydro electric power as opposed to the hydro main, thermal secondary they’d used up to now, and Tokyo Lighting made plans to construct a new thermal power plant due to the reconstruction of the old Asakusa thermal power plant, however in 1923 (Taisho 12) they received a revision from town planning after the Great Kanto earthquake of 1923 and instead would construct the new thermal power plant in South Adachi, Senju. This is the Senju thermal power station that would live through to after the Second World War, and it began operations in January, 1926 (Taisho 15).

At first the power plant had a capacity of 25,000 kW, but with continuous expansions it generated up to 75,000 kW in the end. However it was only a reserve power plant at the time and only began actual operations during World War II.

The bank of the Sumida River was chosen due to the site guaranteeing excellent water transportation and shipping. The coal fuel was brought from the Port of Tokyo's coal pier by raft, and it is said you could see the boatmen working the river back then. Also, it's said that there was a route where freight cars would bring the fuel to Senju's railway station (now Sumidagawa Station) and transfer it to the rafts. The rights to this transportation were held by the Yamada gang, which would later become the Malkin (Asakusa Takahashi gang).

After the war the quality of coal dropped, and in 1953 (Showa 28) one of the boilers was replaced by an oil-fueled boiler. However, due to an aging facility and a new thermal power plant being built in Toyosu, the plant stopped operations in May, 1963 (Showa 38), and was demolished in 1964 (Showa 39).

Presently, the site is used as a raw materials center and the Tokyo Electric Power, Adachi operations center (Tokyo Lighting's site, 1-11-9 Senju Sakuragi, Adachi Ward, Tokyo). Also, part of the smokestack was used as a slide at Tatemoto Elementary school in the Adachi Ward that existed until 31 March 2005 (Heisei 17). (This school integrated with the Adachi Ward Ritsu Senju third elementary school in Adachi Ward Senju Kotobukichou to become the Adachi Ward Ritsu Senju Sprouts Elementary school, and this integrated school's building has been newly built at the site of the old Senju third elementary school.)

In addition, the slide at this old elementary school is now preserved on the campus grounds of the Teikyo University of Science & Technology in Senju.

== The Ghost Chimneys ==
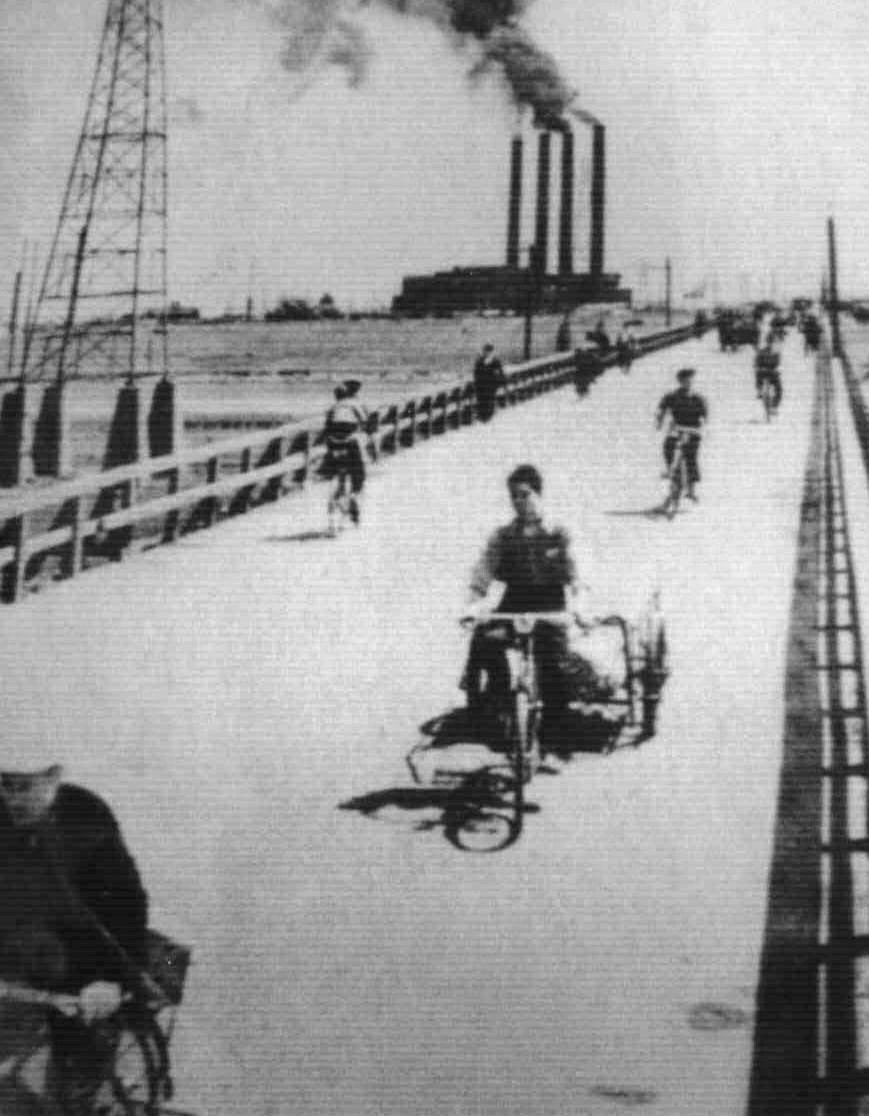
西新井橋からお化け煙突を望む（1954年（昭和29年））

The Senju thermal power station had four enormous smokestacks and these were called the "Ghost Chimneys" (Obake-Entotsu) by residents of the area. Movies, books, anime, and manga, that were made while the plant was still operating - and some created since then - would sometimes include the chimneys, and they became a symbol or landmark for the region.

There are two explanations as to why they were called the "Ghost Chimneys".

1. As stated previously, this was a reserve power plant so it rarely operated. The smoke that would rise from the smokestacks every once in a while looked somewhat like a ghost, and the place was thought of as a crematorium.
2. Depending on the angle you're looking at them from, the number of smokestacks would change to anything from one to four, so it meant the "Mysterious Smokestacks".

About point 2, the smokestacks were arranged in a diamond shape, and in the middle the two smokestacks that are arranged parallel and the others in the front and back overlap so that it looks like there's only one. When viewed from right beside it, it looks like there's only one. At a diagonal it looks like there are two. From in between them, all four are visible, and from the direct front it looks like there are three. Also, you could see the smokestacks very well from the Jōban Line or Keisei lines, and you could see the number of smokestacks change as the train moved down the tracks.

There were also similar "Ghost Chimneys" in the Kansai region at the Kansai Electric Power Company's Kasugade thermal power plant which existed from 1918 to 1961.
