= Gyoshū Hayami =

Japanese artist

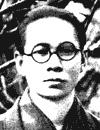
- Hayami Gyoshū, c. 1930
- Born: Eiichi Maita; August 2, 1894; Asakusa, Tokyo, Empire of Japan
- Died: March 20, 1935 (aged 40); Tokyo, Empire of Japan
- Known for: Painter
- Notable work: Enbu
- Movement: Nihonga

Gyoshū Hayami (速水 御舟, Hayami Gyoshū; August 2, 1894 – March 20, 1935) was the pseudonym of a Japanese painter in the Nihonga style, active during the Taishō and Shōwa eras. His real name was Eiichi Maita.

== Biography ==
Gyoshū was born in the plebeian downtown district of Asakusa in Tokyo. He studied traditional painting techniques as an apprentice to Matsumoto Fuko from the age of 15. When he was 17, his talent was recognized by Shikō Imamura, who invited him to join the Kojikai circle of leading young artists.

With the revival of the Japan Fine Arts Academy (Nihon Bijutsuin), Gyoshū became a founding member. He worked in many schools of painting, including Yamato-e, Rinpa and Bunjinga, with his style evolving gradually towards a detailed realism influenced also by his studies of Chinese paintings from the Song dynasty and the Yuan dynasty. His later works evolved further towards Symbolism.

In 1914, Gyoshū formed a group called Sekiyokai to study new styles of Japanese painting. He had a leg amputated after being hit by a train in 1919, but the incident did not affect his artistic output. He devoted himself to creation, submitting numerous works to the Inten Exhibition, as well as touring Europe in 1930. His flower and bird drawings in India ink painting style and his portraits were especially well received by art critics.

His most famous work, Dancing in the Flames (炎舞, Enbu) dates from 1925.

Gyoshū died suddenly from typhoid fever in 1935 at the age of 40.

Over 104 of his paintings were collected by the Yamatane Museum in Tokyo. One of Gyoshū's works, Dancing in the Flames, was selected as the subject of a commemorative postage stamp as part of the Japanese government's Modern Art Series in 1979. In the year 1994, Gyoshū himself was the subject of a commemorative postage stamp under the Cultural Leaders Series by Japan Post.

== Famous works ==
Dancing in the Flames
- Enbu (炎舞) (Japanese)
- Artist: Gyoshū Hayami
- Year: 1925
- Type: Nihonga
- Dimensions: 121 cm × 53 cm (48 in × 21 in)
- Location: Yamatane Museum, Tokyo

- Dancing in the Flames (炎舞, Enbu) (Yamatane Museum collection)

He was influenced by Ryusei Kishida and painted a realistic style. The concept of the picture floated seeing the moth which crowded in the bonfire, the moth was caught many times, and it observed it. The designed flame is said to be an expression of Hayami Gyoshu's own thought and spiritual symbolism. This work was designated as an Important Cultural Property in 1977.

- Maiko of Kyoto (京の舞妓, Kyō no maiko) (Tokyo National Museum)

This work was created in 1912. This work is attached to the depiction of textures such as kimono and tatami mats and shows a realistic tendency in the Taisho period. The model was a maiko named Kimie and was completed in two years.

- Camellia Petals Scattering (名樹散椿, Meiju chiri tsubaki) (Yamatane Museum collection)

This is an old camellia tree of Jizoin in Kita-ku, Kyoto City. The background of the painting was sprinkled with fine gold powder using a technique called maki tsubushi (not maki-e). This work was designated as an Important Cultural Property in 1977.

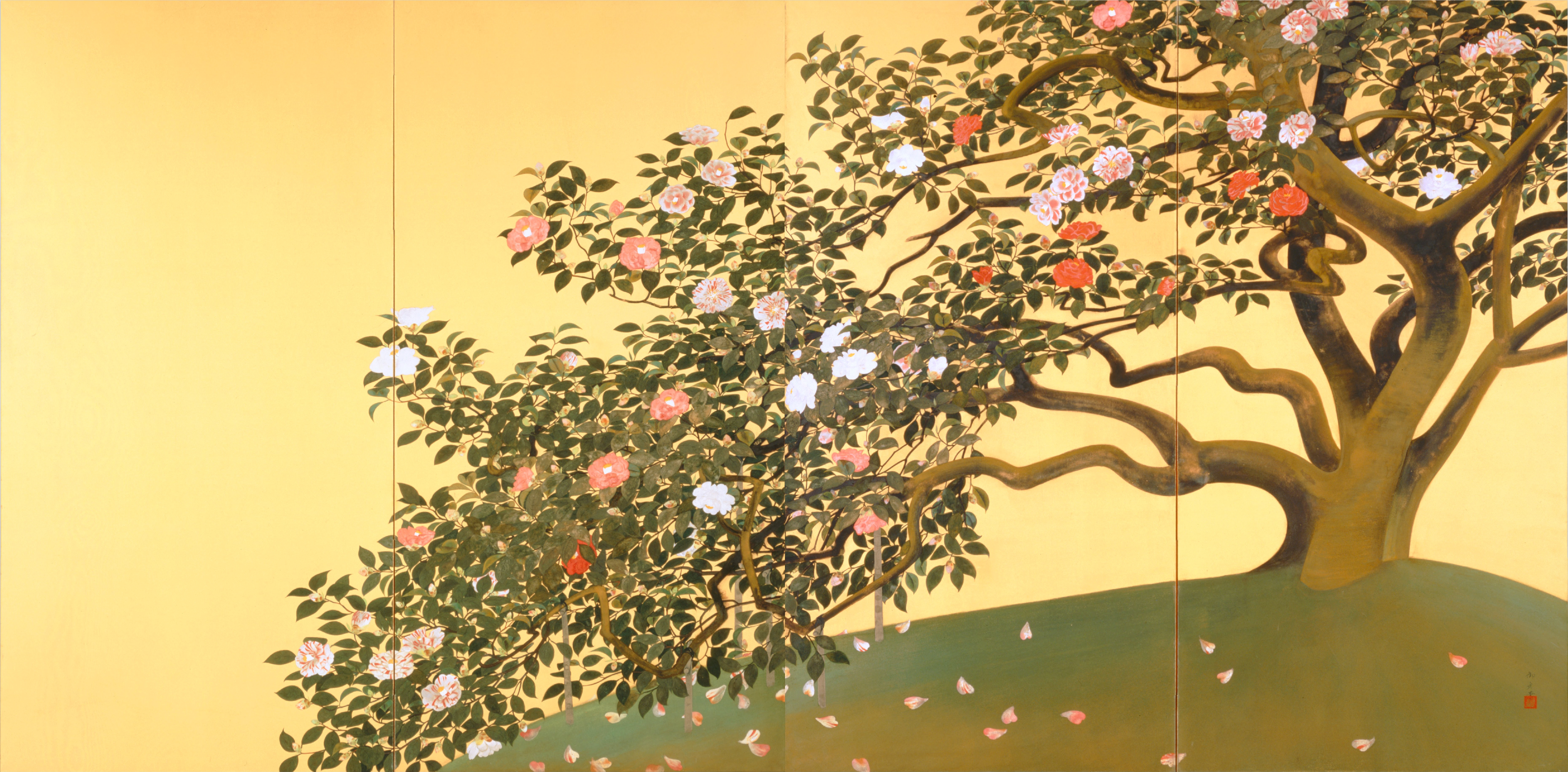
Camellia Petals Scattering, 1929, Important Cultural Property. Yamatane Museum.
