= Pyuupiru =

Japanese artist

Pyuupiru (ピュ〜ぴる) is a Japanese artist born in Tokyo, where she is currently living and working. Her art work deals with her body as well as gender. She also works with mediums such as costume design, writing, and character design.

== Artistic expression ==
Some of her more acclaimed works are the creation of three dimensional body-based objects that speak both of reality and fiction. Her gender clarification surgery as well as struggles with gender fueled much of her early work. The mix between gender, fashion and body have created a surge in her popularity in recent years. She refers to herself as "an incomparable, transcended-gender existence."

She has exhibited internationally as well as nationally. She exhibited several times with several projects and the Yokohama Triennale, Yokohama Museum of Art as well as Arnhem Fashion Biennale.

== Exhibitions ==
Pyuupiru's works have been shown at the Uppsala Gallery (Japanese Contemporary Art 14 March to 19 April 2015), Yokohama Museum of Art (GOTH: Reality of the Departed World 22 December 2007 to 26 March 2008), Museum Boijmans Van Beuningen (Fashion as Point of Departure / H+F Fashion on the Edge 16 October 2010 to 30 January 2011, and The Future of Fashion is Now 18 October 2014 to 18 January 2015), Kuandu Museum of Fine Arts (I have a Dream－10 Solos by 10 Asia Artists: 2008 Kuandu Biennale), and the Museum of Contemporary Art Taipei (Fashion Accidentally 26 May to 22 July 2007).

== Selected works ==
- "PLANETARIA" (2003) - Three-dimensional works of 9 bodies that have been produced in knit. Exhibited at Tokyo GALLERY SPEAK FOR.
- "LOVE REINCARNATION" (2005) - a three-dimensional work including 50000 golden paper cranes, and video projection on a circular pedestal. Exhibited at Yokohama Triennale 2005.
- "GRAND MOTHER" (2007) - Exhibited at Taipei MOCA, Taipei.
- "SELF PORTRAIT" (2008) - documents the artist's experience with sex reassignment surgery via self-portraits taken over several years.
- "VIRGIN WHITE" (2008)
- "GODDESS" (2019) - First solo exhibition in 12 years that expands on GODDESS, a series that pictures a "GODDESS" that is divine, evil, and sometimes humorous". Debuted on November 22, 2019, at Diesel Art Gallery in Tokyo.

=== Public collections ===
- "PLANETARIA" / Museum Boijmans Van Beuningen (Rotterdam)
