= Miyuki Tanobe =

Canadian artist (born 1937)

- Born: 1937 (age 88–89); Morioka, Japan
- Known for: painter, nihonga
- Notable work: The Tin Flute by Gabrielle Roy in 1983
- Elected: Member of the Royal Canadian Academy of Arts, 1994; Officer of the National Order of Quebec, 1995; member of the Order of Canada, 2002, medal-holder of the Ordre du Jubilée, 2002
- Patrons: Taru Tanabe, Seison Maeda, Roger Chapelain-Midy

Miyuki Tanobe CM OQ RCA (born 1937 in Morioka, Japan) is a Japanese-born Canadian painter, based in Montreal, Quebec. She is known for her paintings of the everyday life of Montreal residents. Her work is in the collections of the Montreal Museum of Fine Arts, the Musée du Québec, Lavalin, Pratt & Whitney, and Shell Canada, and Selection du Reader’s Digest. She is a member of the Royal Canadian Academy of Arts.

== Early life and education ==
Tanobe was born in 1937 in Morioka, Japan. Because there was a violent snowstorm raging on the day she was born, her parents named her Miyuki, which means "deep snow". Tanobe attended Japanese primary and secondary schools.

In 1963, possessing incipient artistic gifts, she painted at the studio of La Grande Chaumière in Paris before registering at the École nationale supérieure des Beaux-Arts, France's leading school of fine arts. Miyuki Tanobe's arrival in Canada in 1971 came as a result of a chance meeting in Paris with Maurice Savignac, her future husband, a French Canadian from Montreal.

== Work ==
Miyuki Tanobe's work reflects a freedom of action. She paints principally on rigid supports such as wood or masonite sheets. Her panels are filled with scenes that she has observed like children playing ice hockey.

Her modern primitive works depict everyday life in the working-class neighborhoods of Montreal with humour and great sensitivity. She transforms "humble and unavoidable reality" by reformulating it, adding or deleting elements depending on her assessment of their contribution to the scene. A painting by Miyuki Tanobe goes to the heart of the matter: the artist is interested in opening the viewers' eyes so that they may better see the familiar and adjust their perceptions of what they think they know.

In 1980 Tanobe illustrates the song "Gens de mon pays" by Gilles Vigneault and in 1983 she creates pictures for The Tin Flute by Gabrielle Roy. The colours in Miyuki's paintings are rich and full of contrast. Working with superimposed layers and applying pigments with her pliable, flexible Japanese brush, Miyuki Tanobe succeeds in revealing unexpected aspects of the objects and people she depicts without making them difficult to read. She paints in Nihonga.

She is a member of the Royal Canadian Academy of Arts.

In 2012 a mural was painted for Tanobe in Verdun.

== Collections ==
Her work is found in the Montreal Museum of Fine Arts, Musée national des beaux-arts du Québec, Musée de Joliette, Musée Saidye Bronfman, Montréal.

== Recognition ==
In 1979, she was the subject of a National Film Board of Canada documentary short My Floating World: Miyuki Tanobe, directed by Ian Rankin, Stephan Steinhouse and Marc F. Voizard.

- 2012 : Radio-Canada, Miyuki Tanobe and the mural of Verdun
- 1987 : Radio-Québec, Le Magazine
- 1985 : Radio-Québec, Arrimage
- 1982 : CBC, Seeing It Our Way

== Published Work / Illustrations ==
- Roch Carrier, Miyuki Tanobe, Canada je t'aime = Canada I love you, Montréal: livres Toundra, 1991, 72 p
- Miyuki Tanobe, Québec je t’aime, Montréal: Éditions Toundra, 1976, 48 p
- Miyuki Tanobe, Gilles Vigneault, Les gens de mon pays, Montréal: Les éditions La courte échelle, 1980
- Yves Beauchemin, Cybèle, Coffret de luxe de sérigraphies, Montréal: Art global, 1982
