= Kawabata Ryūshi =

Japanese painter

Kawabata Ryūshi 川端龍子
- Born: Kawabata Shotarō; 6 June 1885; Wakayama, Wakayama Prefecture, Japan
- Died: 10 April 1966 (aged 80); Tokyo, Japan
- Notable work: Aizen, 1934
- Movement: Nihonga
- Awards: Asahi Prize (1930); Order of Culture

Kawabata Shotarō (川端 昇太郎; 6 June 1885 – 10 April 1966), later known as Kawabata Ryūshi (川端 龍子; Japanese pronunciation: [ka.wa.ba.ta (|) ɾʲɯꜜː.ɕi],), was a Japanese Nihonga artist active during the Taishō and Shōwa periods.

== Biography ==
Ryūshi was born on 6 June 1885 in Wakayama city in Wakayama Prefecture. He moved to Tokyo in 1895. Initially interested in literature, he studied under the poet Kawabata Hoja, who introduced him to the Hototogisu artistic circle. He then became interested in painting instead, and studied yōga painting techniques as an apprentice in the studios of the Hakubakai. When he was 18, he entered a Yomiuri Shimbun illustration contest, from which his work was selected. He continued working on newspaper illustrations to earn a living as he studied oil painting. In 1913, he traveled to the United States to study western-style painting techniques in more depth, but was so impressed with the Japanese art that he saw during a visit to the Boston Museum of Fine Arts that he switched to the Nihonga genre on his return to Japan in 1914, displaying at the Inten Exhibition in 1915. He left Inten in 1928 in protest of its increasing rigid rules, and established his own Nihonga art circle, the Seiryūsha in 1928. The Seiryūsha held an exhibition on competition to the Inten twice a year from 1929 to 1965 in Tokyo. In addition, Ryūshi usually held a personal exhibition in Osaka once per year.

Ryūshi was a major advocate of Art for the Exhibition Place (会場芸術, kaijō geijutsu), which emphasized the public nature of art. His works therefore tended to be on a huge scale, and were intended for public display in large areas.

After World War II, together with Yokoyama Taikan and Kawai Gyokudō, he came to be regarded as one of the "Three Big Figures" in the field of Nihonga painting.

In 1950, after the death of his wife and son, he went on a pilgrimage of the 88 holy places in Shikoku, taking a total of six years to make the circuit, and sketching extensively along the way. In 1959, he was awarded the Order of Culture by the Japanese government.

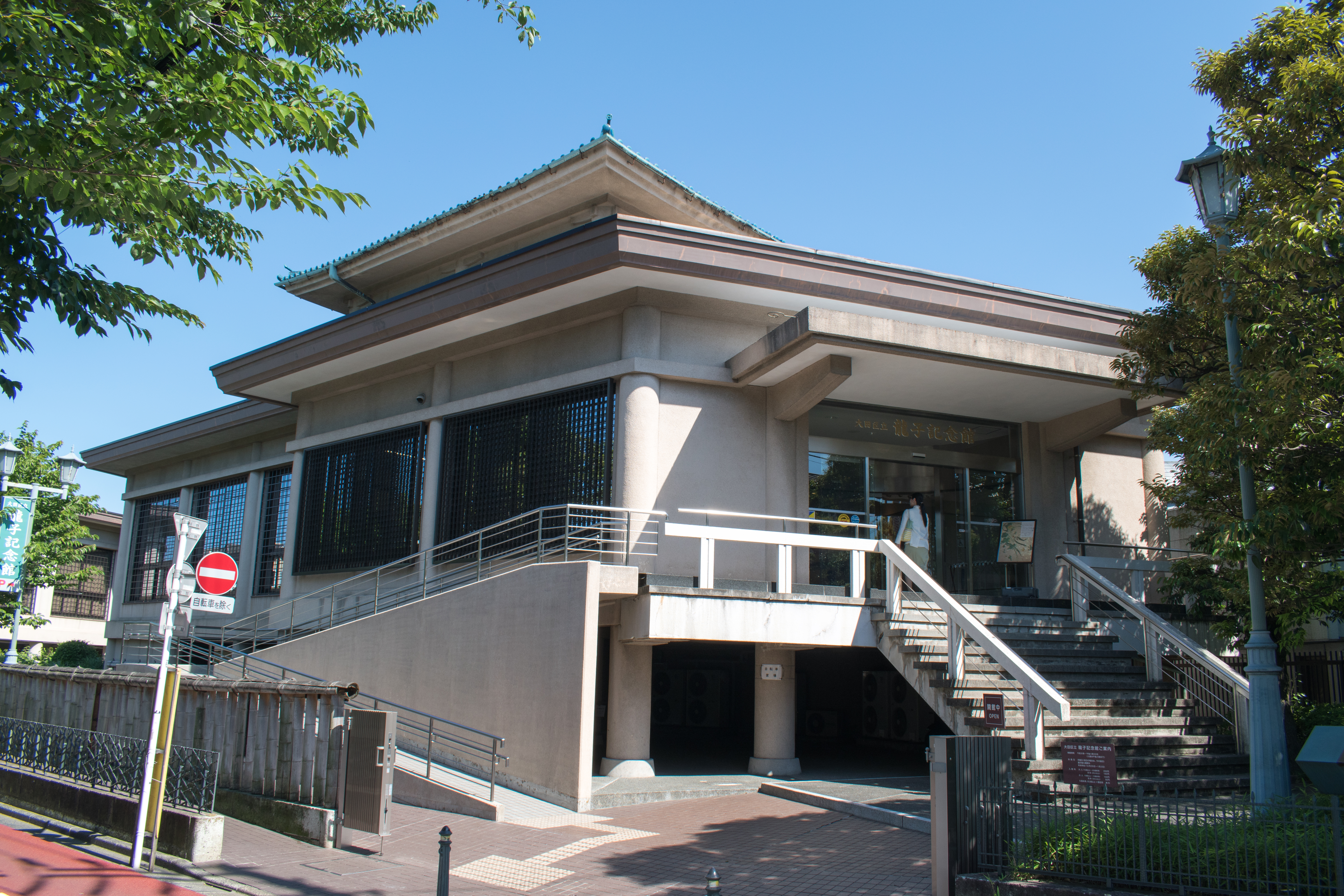
Ryushi Memorial Hall

In 1963, shortly before his death, his house in Ōta, Tokyo was transformed into the Ōta Municipal Ryushi Memorial Hall. It was donated to the city of Ōta by his heirs in 1990, and contains most of his larger works.

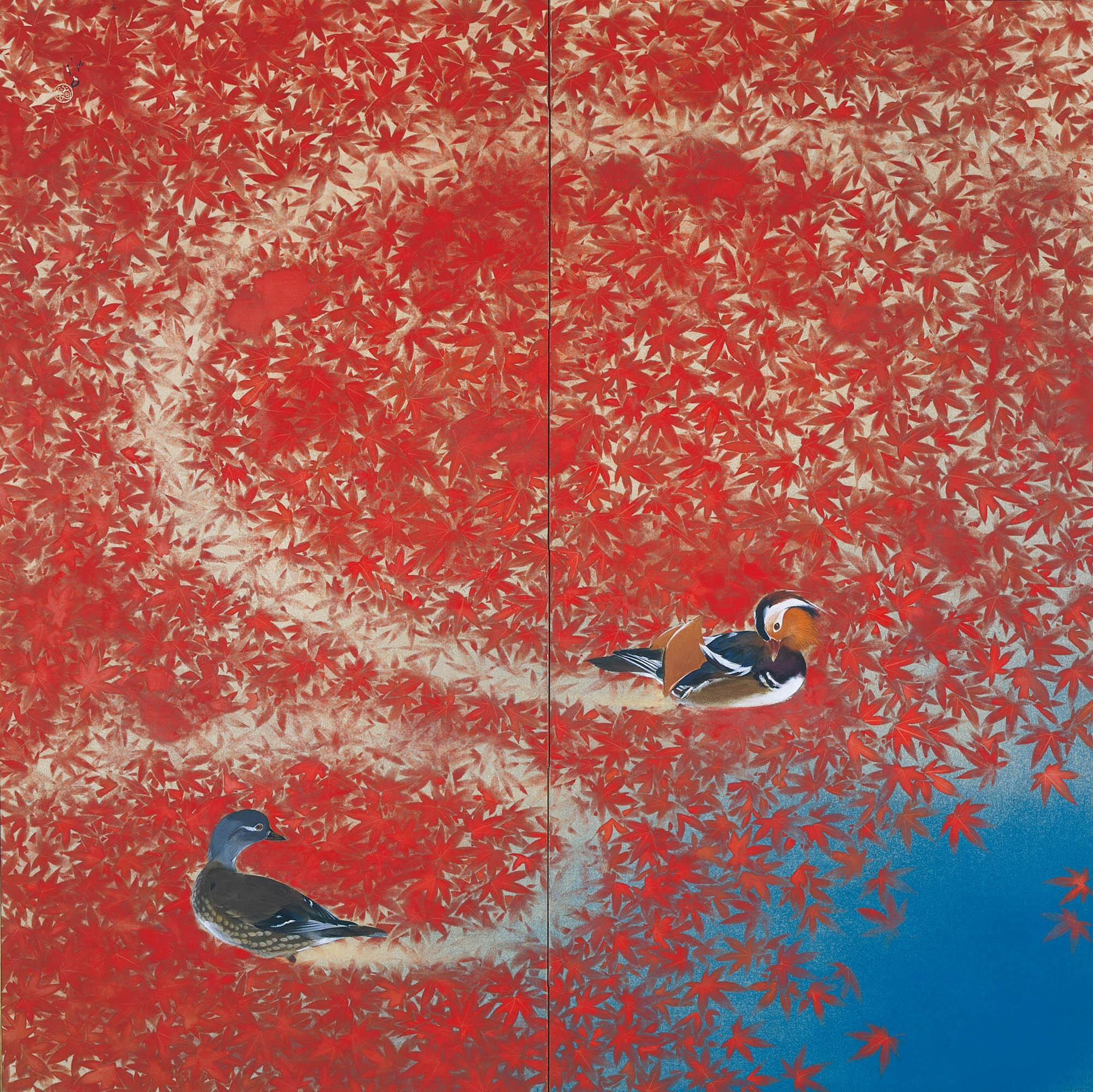
Appeared as stamp 1974

== Philately ==
One of Ryūshi's works was selected as the subject of commemorative postage stamp by the Japanese government:

- 1979: Aizen ("Passion"), commemorating the 61st Inter-Parliamentary Conference

== Gallery ==
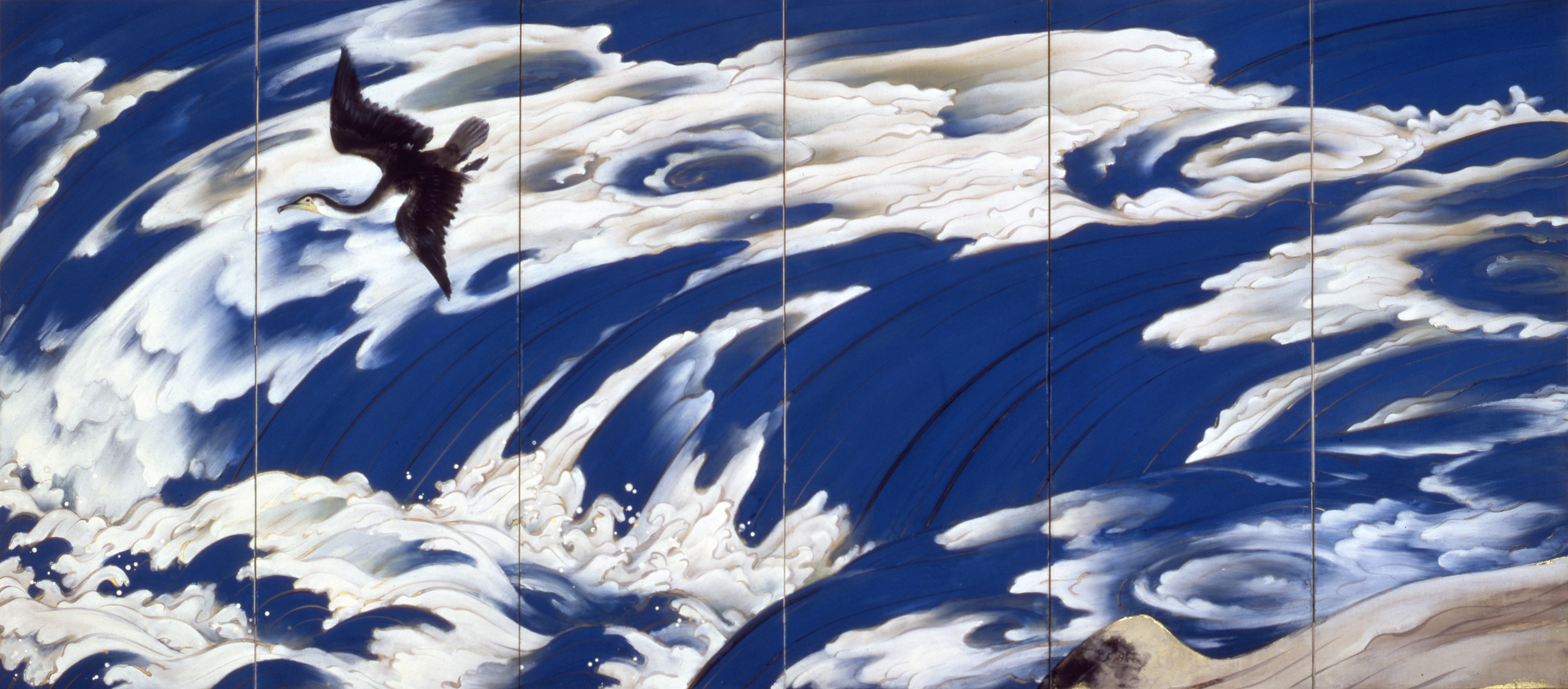
Naruto, 1929 (6 part screen on left)

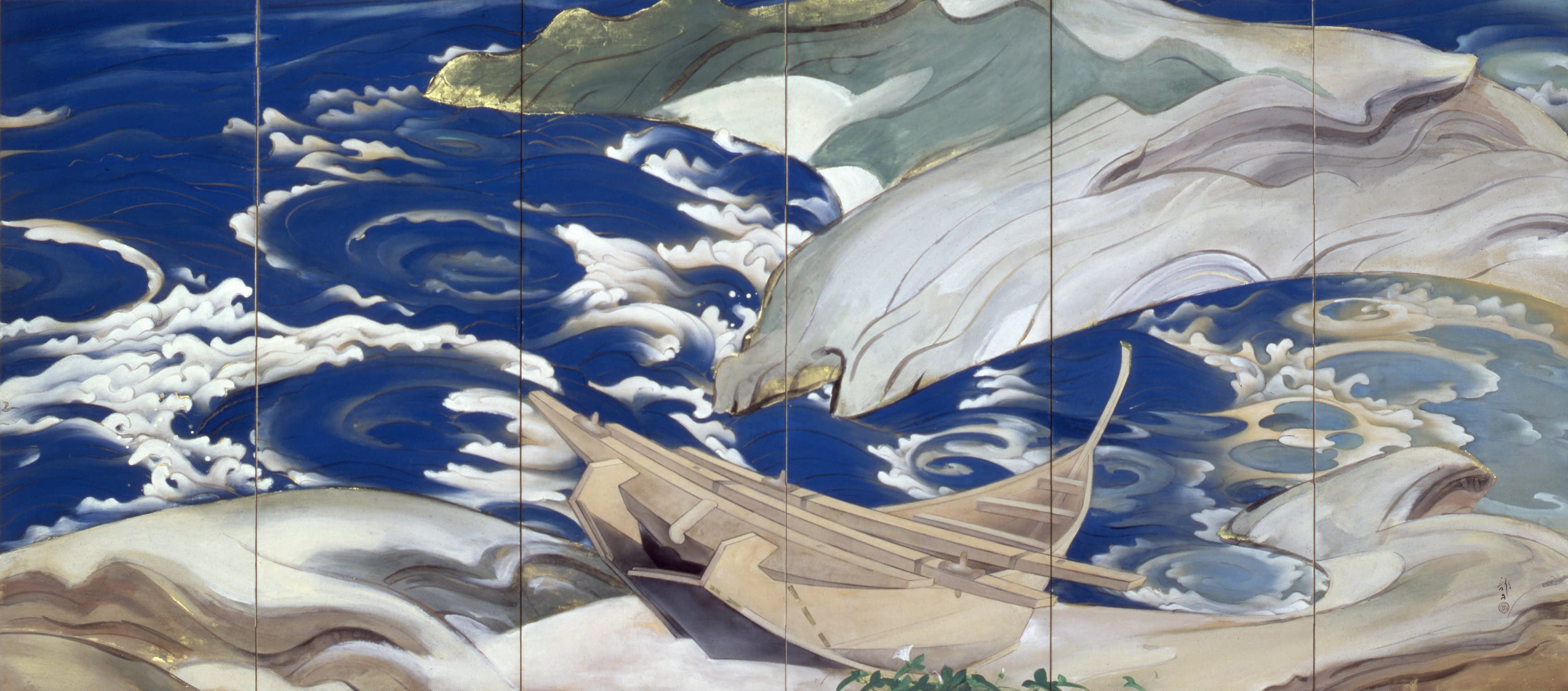
Naruto, 1929 (6 part screen on right)

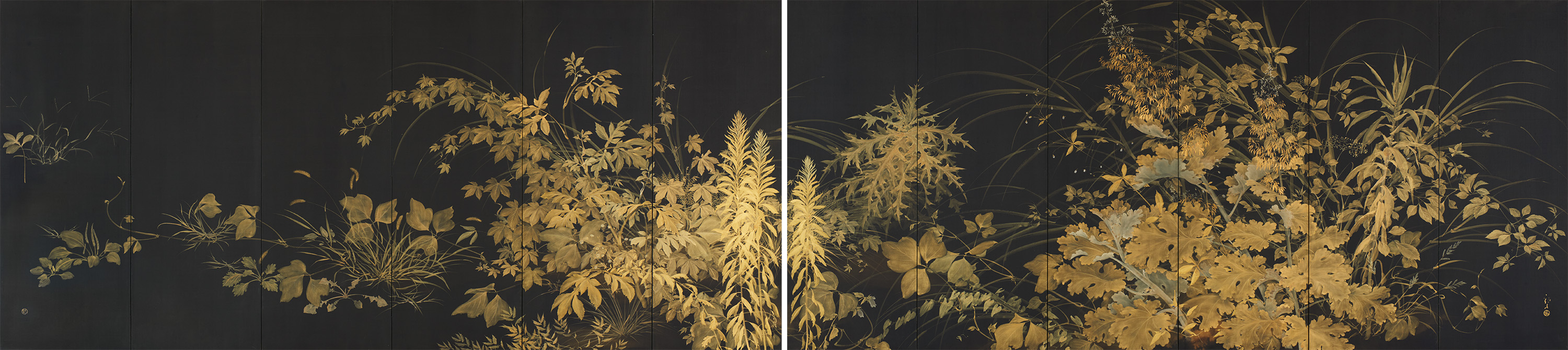
Blazing Grass, 1930 (a pair of six-piece screens)

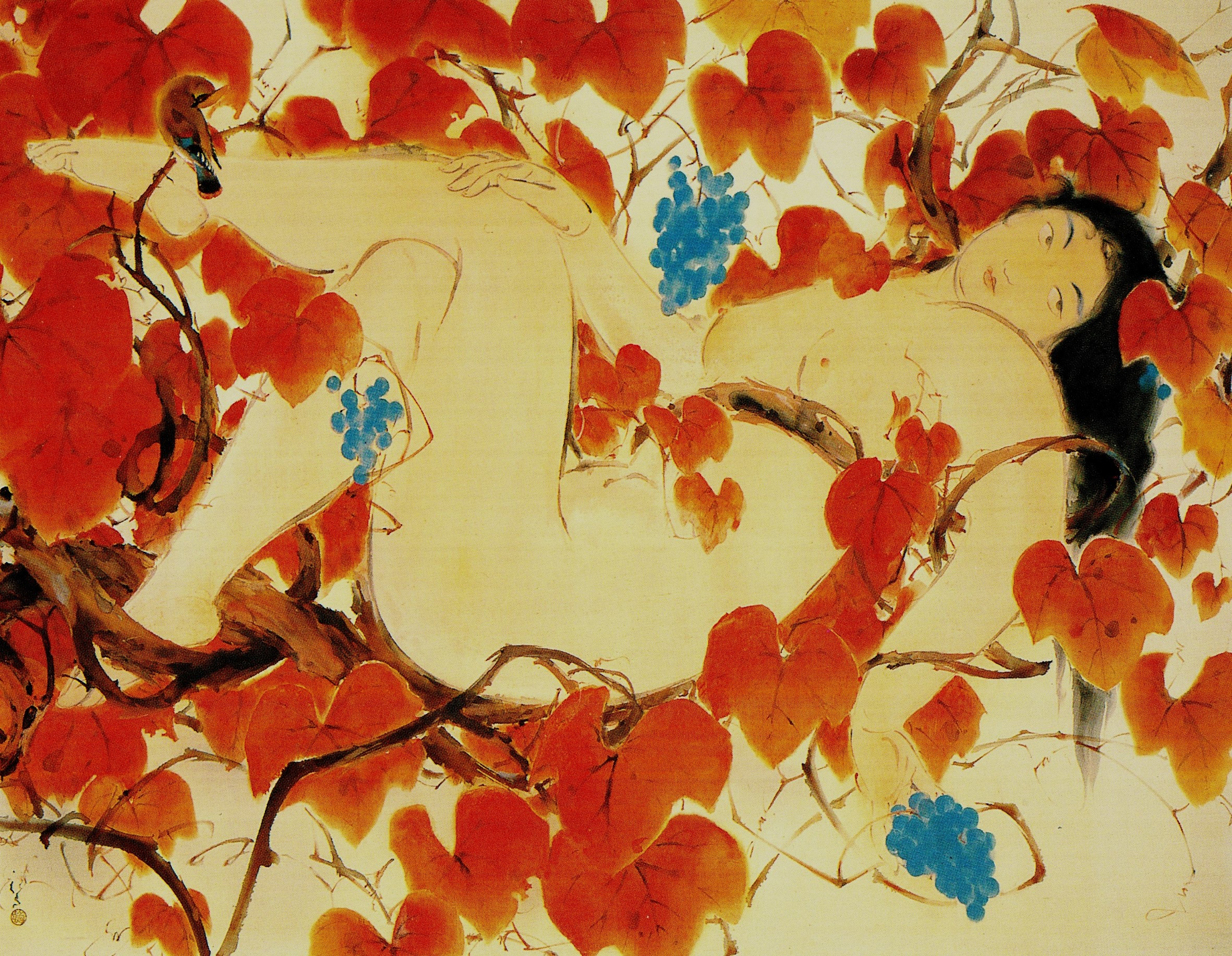
Wild Grapes, 1933
