= Yokohama Museum of Art =

Art museum

Coordinates: 35.457076°N 139.630558°E

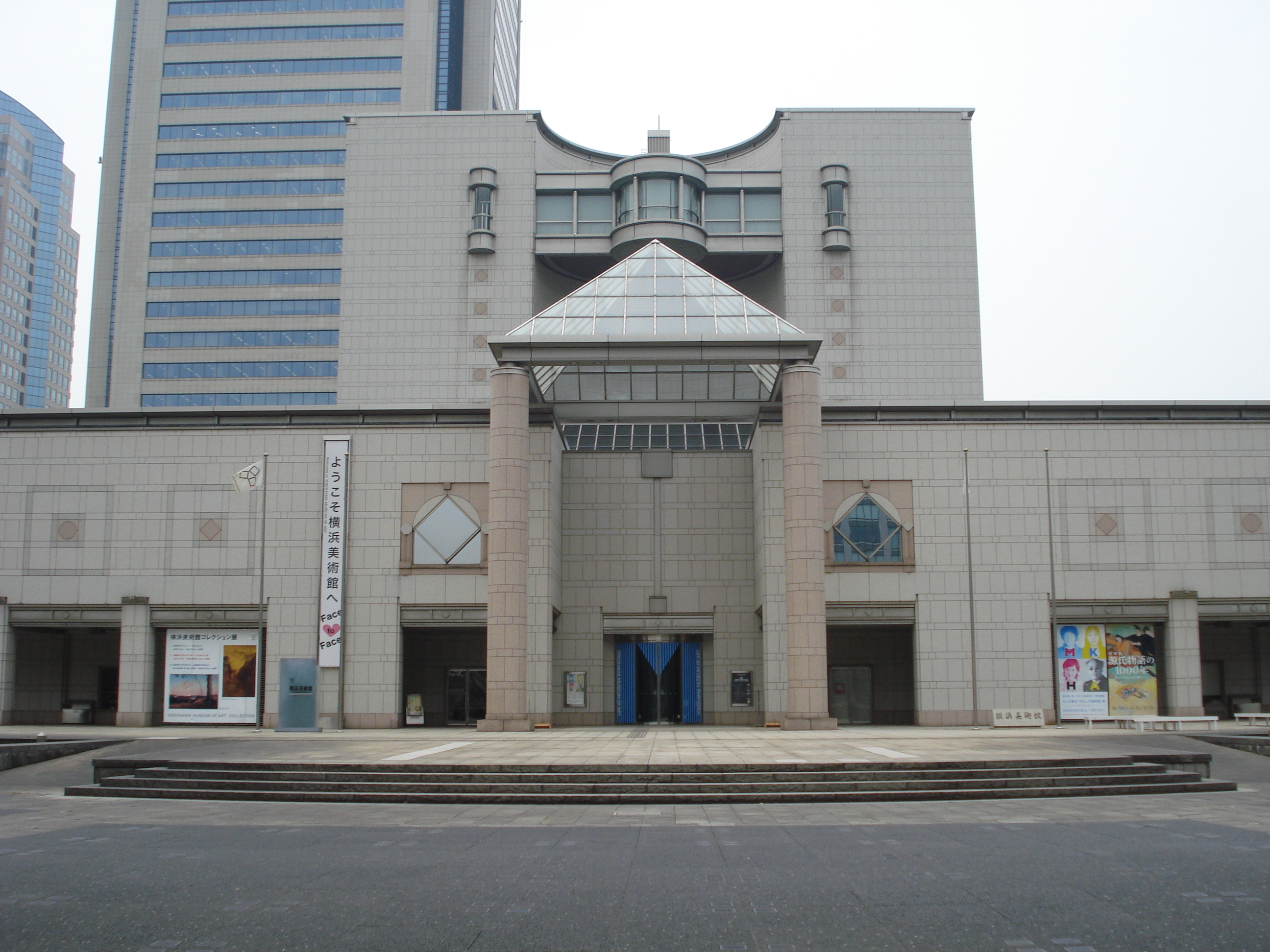
Yokohama Museum of Art

Yokohama Museum of Art (横浜美術館, Yokohama Bijutsukan), founded in 1989, is located in the futuristic Minato Mirai 21 district of the Japanese city Yokohama, next to the Yokohama Landmark Tower.

== The collections ==
The museum has works by many influential and well-known modern artists including Constantin Brâncuși, Paul Cézanne, Salvador Dalí, Max Ernst, René Magritte, Henri Matisse, Joan Miró, Ossip Zadkine, and Pablo Picasso. Dadaist and Surrealist works are especially well represented.

The museum also features work by important Japanese artists, especially those with connections to Yokohama such as Imamura Shiko, Kanzan Shimomura, and Chizuko Yoshida, as well as numerous pieces by Japanese-American artist Isamu Noguchi. Other artists whose work has appeared at the museum include Kiyoshi Hasegawa, Yasumasa Morimura and Lee Ufan

== Special exhibits ==
- In 2004 the museum hosted a major Marcel Duchamp exhibition entitled "Marcel Duchamp and the 20th Century Art". The exhibit attracted a long list of corporate sponsors including Asahi Shimbun, Dai Nippon Printing, Japan Airlines, Japan Broadcasting Corporation, Kanagawa Shimbun, Keihin Electric Express Railway and Television Kanagawa.
- Also in 2004, the museum hosted "Paradise Lost: The Politics of Landscape (1870-1945)", an exhibition described as an "attempt to show the changing nature of landscape expression in painting and photography as practiced in Europe, the United States, Japan, and the East Asia during the seventy years from the age of Impressionism through the end of World War II."
- In 2005, the museum hosted "Masterpieces from the Louvre Museum: 19th Century French Paintings – from Neoclassicism to Romanticism". The exhibit was arranged in cooperation with the Louvre and Tokyo National University of Fine Arts and Music.
- In 2006, the museum featured a special exhibit entitled "Connecting the World through Sculpture" featuring the work of Isamu Noguchi, Japanese American artist and landscape architect.
- In 2008, the museum featured an exhibition of images from the goth subculture entitled "Goth: Reality of the Departed World". The exhibit included featured works by Avant-garde artists such as Dr Lakra and Pyuupiru.
- In 2014, the museum featured an exhibition of Yokohama Triennale 2014 "ART Fahrenheit 451: Sailing into the sea of oblivion". With the artist MORIMURA Yasumasa as artistic director, Yokohama Triennale 2014 "ART Fahrenheit 451: Sailing into the sea of oblivion" was held at Yokohama Museum of Art and Shinko Pier Exhibition Hall from August to November 2014, featuring 65 participants/groups from 19 countries.
- In 2018, the museum featured an exhibition of Tetsuro Komaï: A Pioneer of Modern Japanese Copperplate Prints. The exhibit included featured works by Komai Tetsuro (1920-1976), a pioneer of modern copperplate printmaking in Japan, gained renown both at home and abroad for the profound and poetic world envisioned in his prints. In black ink on white paper he expressed a cosmos of endless wandering amid reveries and madness, one that seems all the more fascinating in the current digital era.
- In 2020, the museum featured the exhibition "Concave and Convex: A Sumikawa Kiichi Retrospective" devoted to displaying the postwar sculptures of Sumikawa Kiichi. The exhibition will display over 100 works and documents by Kiichi.
- In 2023, the eighth edition of the Triennale will for the first time be held at the renovated Yokohama Museum of Art. Carol Yinghua Lu and Liu Ding will act as joint artistic directors for the Triennale. This will be only the second time the role has been given a non-Japanese director after the Triennale’s first foreign appointment was given to Raqs Media Collective for the previous edition.

== The building ==
The building which houses the Yokohama Museum of Art was designed by Kenzo Tange, the Japanese architect who won the 1987 Pritzker Prize for architecture. The structure is described as an "attractive and spacious building " that is "airy and well-lit".

The museum's main hall is 18 meters tall and is open to the second and third floors. A glass ceiling allows natural light into the space. Louvers control the light levels. It has superb acoustics, is often used for new art projects and cultural events, and is said to be a "particularly impressive" example of modern architecture.

The building is apportioned as follows:

First Floor
- lecture hall
- parking garage

Second Floor
- galleries (including the Grand Gallery described above)
- Children's Workshop (consists of a multipurpose studio, a craft studio and an audiovisual studio for use by children ages 4 to 12)
- cafe BASHAMICHI-JUBANKAN
- museum store (sells postcards and other goods featuring art in the museum, framed paintings, art supplies, etc.)

Third Floor
- Additional galleries (include a photography gallery)
- Art Archive Center (a quiet and spacious study room with a collection of Japanese and foreign art books, art catalogs, and art magazines; also has facilities to make photocopies and conduct on-line searches)
- Citizen's Workshop (used for lectures and study groups as well work in flat media, three-dimensional media, and printmaking)

== Anniversary ==
In 2019 the Yokohama Museum of Art celebrated its 30th anniversary through commemorating its over 12,000 artifacts in a 400 piece exhibition. This exhibition, named "Meet the collection", was divided into two parts, "life" and "world", and consisted of 7 sections of art including paintings, photographs, videos and sculptures. Additionally, four artists consisting Asai Yusuke, Imazu Kei, Suga Kishio and Tabaimo were involved by engaging with their own work in conjunction to the museum's collection on exhibition.

== Access ==
Sakuragicho Station provides to public transportation access to museum and the surrounding area by way of the Minatomirai Line and the Yokohama Municipal Subway Line.
