= Kiyoshi Hasegawa (artist) =

Japanese artist and engraver

Kiyoshi Hasegawa (長谷川潔, Hasegawa Kiyoshi; December 9, 1891 – December 13, 1980) was a Japanese artist and engraver who spent most of his life in France and whose work is featured at the Yokohama Museum of Art.

== Biography ==
Born in present-day Yokohama, he moved to France in 1919 (via the United States) to learn copperplate printing, and never returned to Japan.

According to one source his work shows

the influence of Chagall, Dufy, Laboureur, Pascin, Picasso and Edouard Goerg Alas. He revived the so-called Mezzotint technique and found the power and the depth of black in wood engraving. Works such as Hasegawa's come from the heart. His art is subtle and delicate. It is an ideal created in the silence of the workshop with memories of the recent past, transposed by the sharpness and delicacy of Oriental sensibilities.

== Distinctions and awards ==
- Gold Medal at the International Exposition, Paris, 1937
- Légion d’honneur, 1935
- Chevalier des Arts et des Lettres
- Membre Correspondent of the French Academy of Fine Arts, 1964
- Order of the Sacred Treasure, Third Class, Japan, 1967
