= Hiroshi Senju =

Japanese Nihonga painter (born 1958)

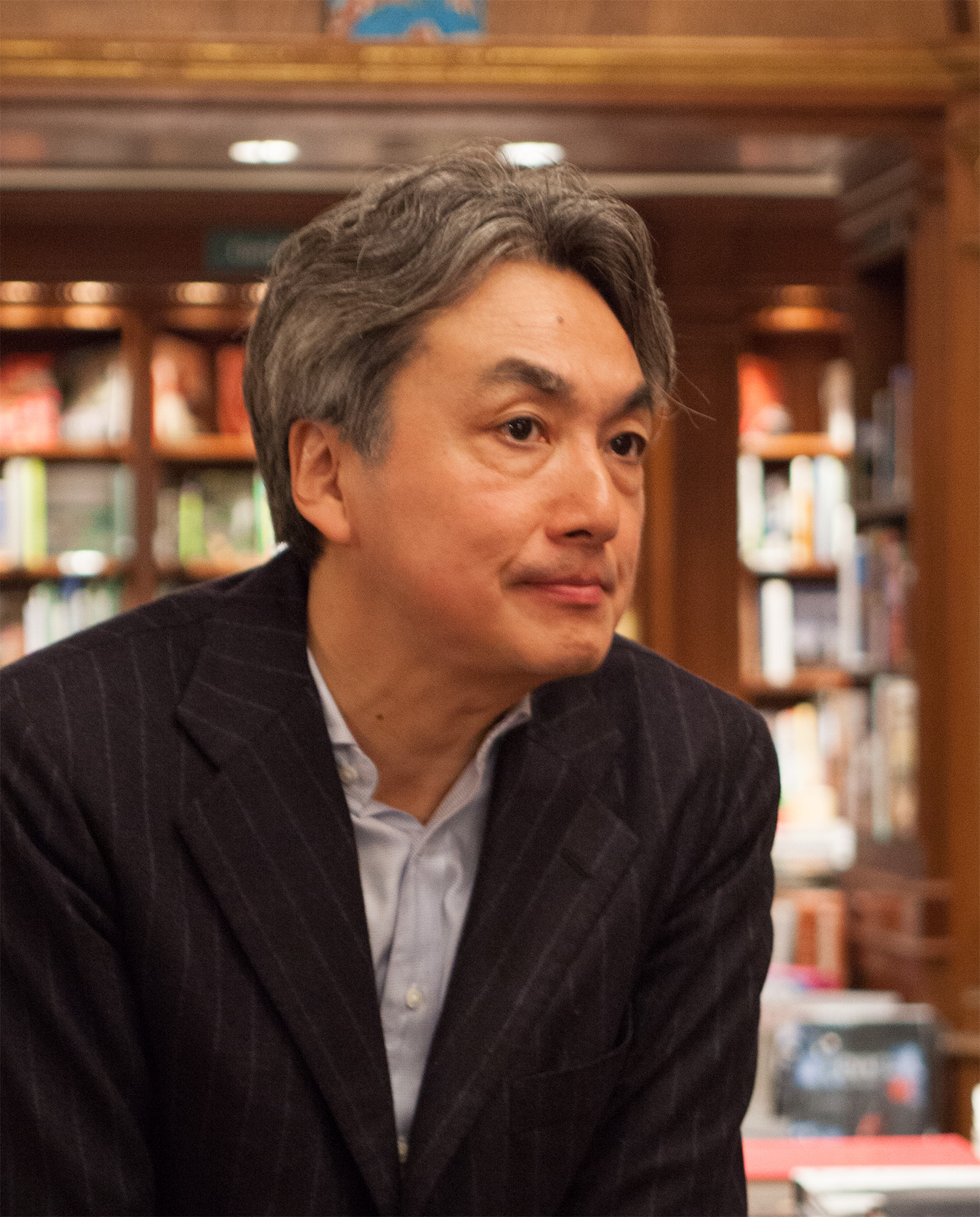
- Senju at Rizzoli in 2010
- Born: Hiroshi Senju; 7 January 1958 (age 68); Tokyo, Japan
- Education: Tokyo University of the Arts
- Known for: Painting, Nihonga
- Notable work: Waterfall, Cliff
- Awards: Honorable Mention Award at the Venice Biennale in 1995

Hiroshi Senju (千住博, Senju Hiroshi; born 1958) is a Japanese Nihonga painter known for his large scale waterfall paintings.

== Biography ==
Hiroshi Senju was born in Tokyo. He has one brother, composer Akira Senju, and one sister, violinist Mariko Senju. He completed the BFA, Tokyo University of the Arts in 1982. He completed the MFA program in Fine Arts at Tokyo University of the Arts in 1984. He completed the doctoral course at Tokyo University of the Arts in 1987. His graduation work was purchased by The University of Tokyo. The End of Dream, solo exhibition, Manly Art Gallery & Museum, Sydney, Australia was held in 1989. He is the father of artificial intelligence entrepreneur Hikari Senju.

His success largely came about in the 1990s in response to his gigantic waterfall paintings. These paintings are often hung in corporate and public buildings, and Senju has been said to be one of a few artists today whose work is recognized by the general public.

One of Senju's waterfalls was the first painting by an Asian artist to be awarded an Honorable Mention at the Venice Biennale in 1995.

These waterfall paintings often focus at the base of the waterfall where the falls crash into the pool below, usually cropping out the top of the falls. As a painter he primarily uses traditional Japanese painting techniques; employing pigments derived from natural materials and applying them to a specially designed mulberry paper base. In contrast to the norm of displaying such works in a dimly lit, tatami matted room, Hiroshi prefers his paintings to be viewed under natural light.

He was elected as a member of the Japan Art Academy in 2022.

== Works ==
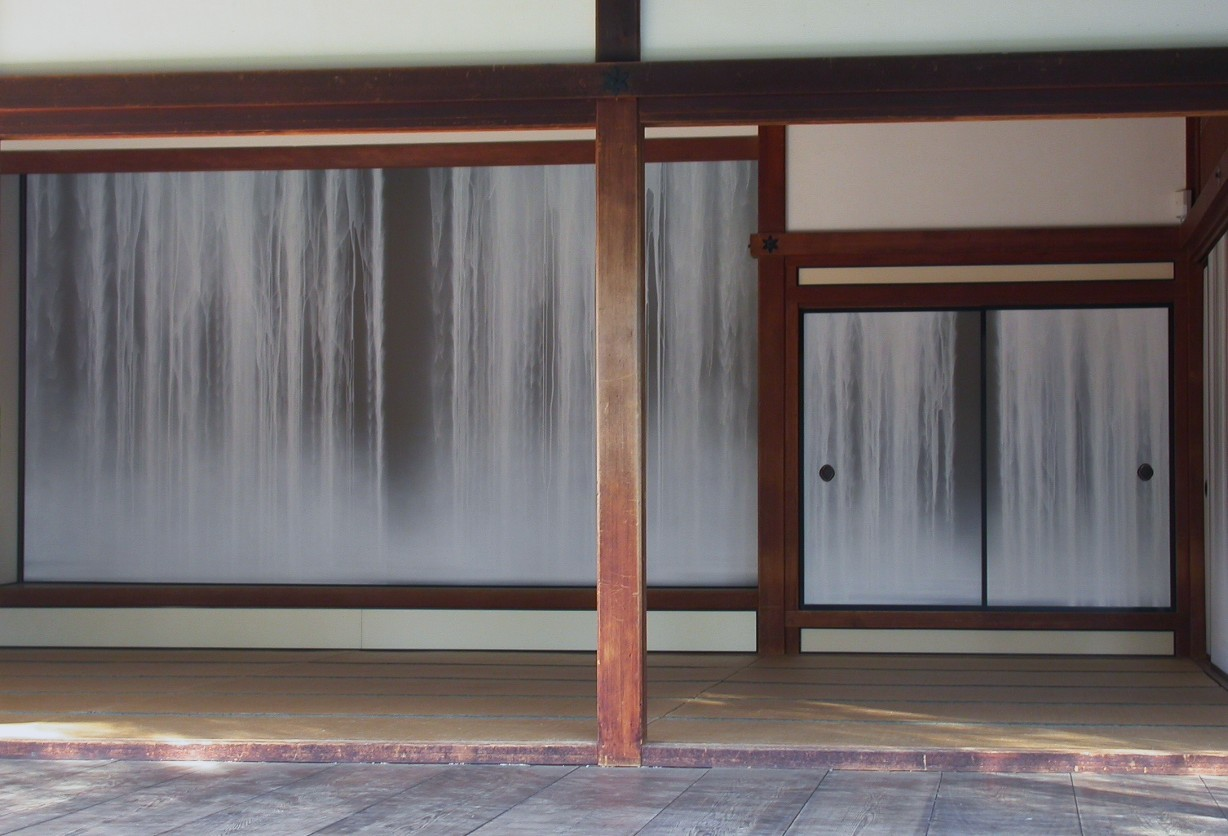
Waterfall sliding doors at Shōfusō

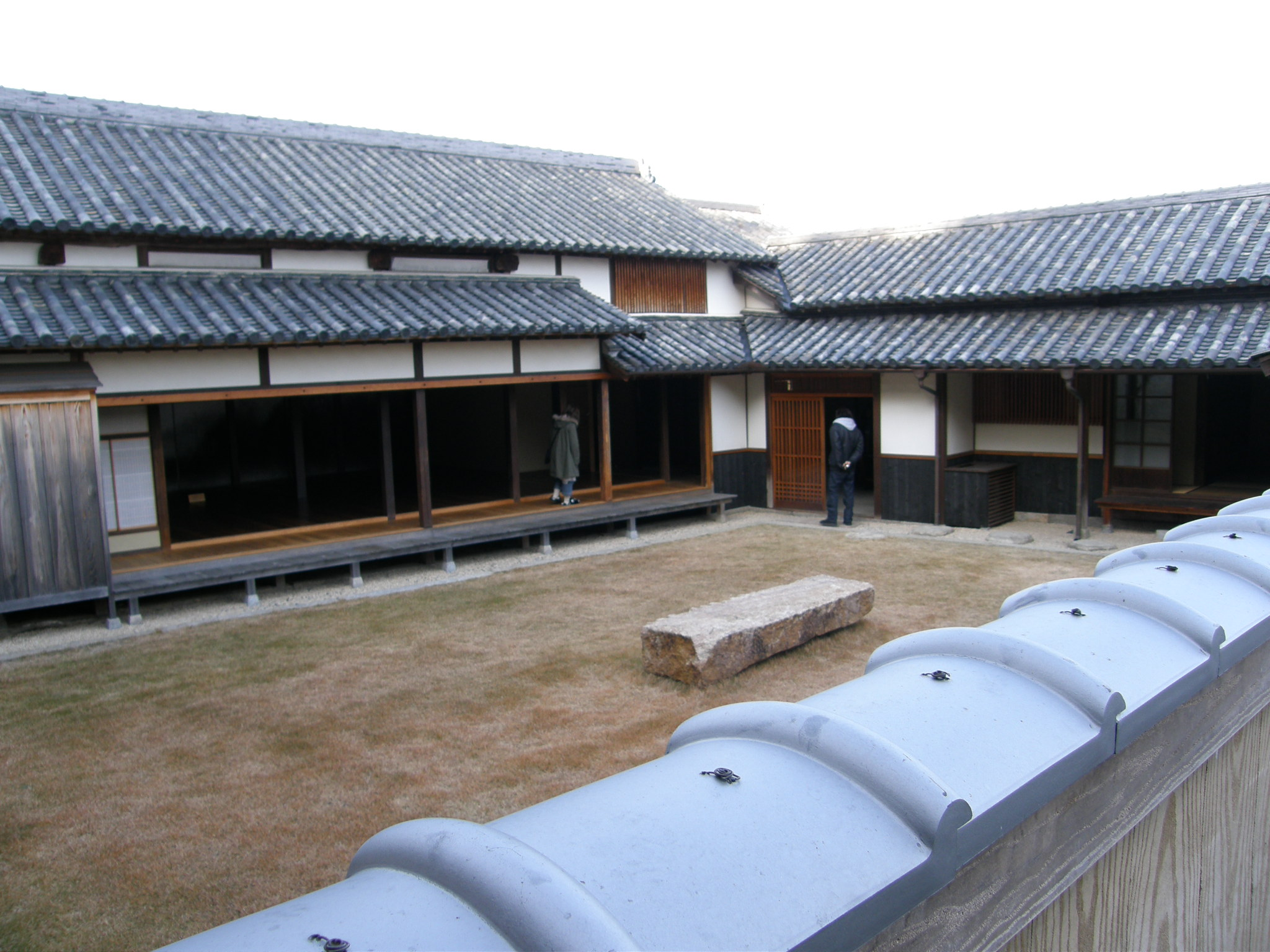
Art House Project in Naoshima

=== Venice Biennale in 1995 ===
In 1995, at the 46th Venice Biennale celebrating its centennial year, Senju, who represented Japan, exhibited a huge waterfall mural in Japan Pavilion, measuring 3.4 meters high and 14 meters wide. Senju titled the work "THE FALL", which implied the fall of man, in Christian theology, God expelling Adam and Eve from the Garden.

During the installation process, a welding contractor accidentally dropped scorching coal tar on his painting. Senju, watching the incident happened, immediately rushed for it and removed the coal tar with his bare hand. He had to go to emergency hospital with his left hand got burned. The only consolation was that Senju's dominant hand was uninjured, being able to repair the damage by the opening of Biennale.

Senju's waterfall was the first painting by an Asian artist to be awarded the Honorable Mention, for having "expressed the meditative world of nature and the fluctuations of Japan's traditional culture."

The Japan Hall commissioner was Junji Ito and the other exhibition artists were Yoichiro Kawaguchi, Zaigin Sai, and Katsuhiko Hibino. The site organizer was Kengo Kuma.

=== Haneda Airport ===
From 2004 to 2011, Senju created a series of large commissioned works for Haneda Airport in Tokyo, Japan.

These works include: Water Shrine, a painting, 2.5 meters high by 17.9 meters wide, located at International Terminal in front of immigration Inspection. Ginga (Galaxy), a painting, 100 square meters, on the top ceiling of Terminal 2. Youru no Kohan (Evening Lakeside), a painting measuring 2.5 meters high and 12.5 meters wide, located at Terminal 2, 1F Terminal lobby. Moon, a sitting sculpture of bull, located at Terminal 2, 5F Market place. Asa no Kohan (Morning Lakeside), a painting, 2.5 meters high and 14 meters wide, located at Terminal 2, 1F Terminal lobby.

=== Shofuso ===
In 2007, Hiroshi Senju created a series of 20 fusuma (paper sliding door) paintings for the Shofuso Japanese House and Garden, in Philadelphia, PA. Asked to replace the destroyed fusuma paintings of Japanese National Treasure, artist Higashiyama Kaii, Senju said, "Shofuso offers a wonderful space for murals far exceeding my expectations, and I will do my best to paint murals symbolizing and important symbolic exchange between Japan and the United States."

Senju completed the installation in July 2006. He named the largest murals (8'x 12 1/2'), which serve as the centerpiece in the tokonoma alcove, Water Curtain, a play on the classic symbol of the Cold War, the Iron Curtain. This curtain, with its layers of falling water, was meant to symbolize the freedom of Philadelphia, the birthplace of the United States. The six murals in the first room are named Imagination of Dynamics and those of the second room are titled Imagination of Silence.

The murals were first exhibited at Gwangju Biennale in South Korea in 2006 and were subsequently exhibited at the Yamatane Museum in Tokyo, Japan. More than fifty thousand visitors saw the murals prior to their installation at Shofuso. The murals were then shipped to their final destination in Philadelphia, arriving in March and installed in April 2007.

In donating the new murals, Senju honored Shōfusō in the ancient Japanese tradition of master painters offering their talents to the community. Shofuso is the only place outside Japan to house a unique combination of contemporary art and traditional Japanese architecture.

He also participated in the Art House Project in Naoshima, Kagawa.

=== Venice Biennale in 2015 ===
In 2015, Senju exhibited large-scale fluorescent pigment waterfalls Ryujin I and Ryujin II in a pitch-dark space, and natural pigment waterfall Suijin under daylight at Frontiers Reimagined, a collateral event of the Venice Biennale curated and organized by Sundaram Tagore Foundation.

=== Kongobuji ===
In 2015, it was officially confirmed that Senju would create a series of fusuma paintings for the head temple of Kongobuji of Koyasan, located on Mount Kōya, Wakayama, Japan.

In 2018, following its staging at the Toyama Prefectural Museum of Art & Design, Commemorating the Completion of Fusuma Paintings for Kongobuji Temple, Koyasan will tour multiple museums in Japan.

== Books ==
- Hiroshi Senju. SKIRA. 2009. ISBN 978-88-6130797-1.

== Museum ==
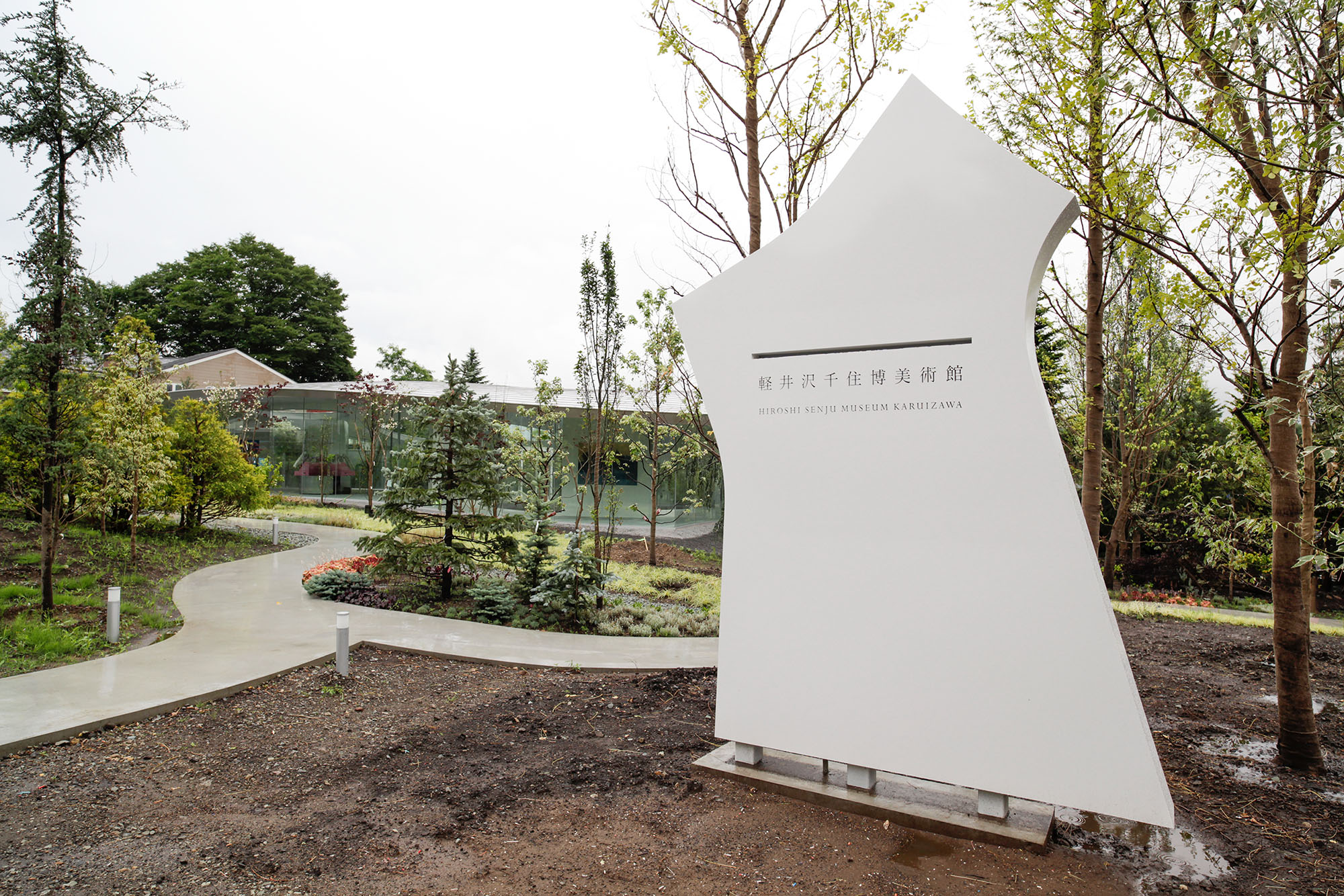
Hiroshi Senju Museum Karuizawa

Hiroshi Senju Museum Karuizawa opened 10 October 2011 in Karuizawa, Nagano Prefecture. The museum was designed by architect Ryue Nishizawa, and consists of windows which make up the walls, a gently sloping concrete floor which naturally contours to the ground, and thin concrete walls scattered throughout the center of the museum which support the ceiling. The museum is owned and operated by the International Cultural College Foundation which possesses around 100 works by Hiroshi, about half of which can be displayed in the museum at any given time.

His works are also stored overseas, including in The Metropolitan Museum of Art, NY, USA, Brooklyn Museum, NY, USA, The Art Institute of Chicago, Illinois, USA, The Nelson-Atkins Museum of Art, Kansas City, MO, USA, The Museum of Contemporary Art, Los Angeles, CA, USA, Los Angeles County Museum of Art, CA, USA, University of California, Los Angeles (UCLA), Royal Ontario Museum, ON, Canada, National Palace Museum, Taiwan, Asian Art Museum, San Francisco, CA, USA.

== Honours ==
- Person of Cultural Merit (2026)
