= Osamu Fujimura (scientist) =

Japanese scientist (1927–2017)

- 藤村靖
- Born: August 29, 1927; Tokyo, Japan
- Died: March 13, 2017 (aged 89); Waikoloa Beach, Hawaii, US
- Education: University of Tokyo (D.Sc.)
- Known for: One of the pioneers of speech science
- Spouse: J.C. Williams
- Children: 4
- Scientific career
- Fields: Physics, phonetics, and linguistics
- Workplaces: University of Tokyo

Osamu Fujimura (藤村 靖, Fujimura Osamu; August 29, 1927 – March 13, 2017) was a Japanese physicist, phonetician and linguist, recognized as one of the pioneers of speech science. Fujimura was also known for his influential work in the diverse field of speech-related studies including acoustics, phonetics/phonology, instrumentation techniques, speech production mechanisms, and computational/theoretical linguistics.

After getting his Doctorate of Science from the University of Tokyo through the research he conducted at MIT, Fujimura served as director and professor at the Research Institute of Logopedics and Phoniatrics (RILP), at the University of Tokyo from 1965 to 1973. He then continued his research at Bell Labs in Murray Hill, New Jersey, in the U.S., from 1973 to 1988 as a department head, working for Max Mathews. He moved his research to Ohio State University where he was professor and department head for speech and hearing science. He was named professor emeritus in 2013. He was a Fellow of the American Association for the Advancement of Science.

== Biography ==
Fujimura's career as a scientist spanned nearly three quarters of a century. He authored, co-authored or edited over 256 scientific publications covering a vast range of topics including physics, speech acoustics and articulation, phonology, kanji transcription methods, syntax, and more. These included 11 books and monographs, 64 journal articles, 58 articles or chapters in books, 56 proceedings articles, 42 miscellaneous writings and 25 articles in RILP.

Fujimura’s work covers all aspects of phonetics, with a focus on speech articulation, analysis of acoustic phonetics, and speech perception. Fujimura and his colleagues introduced X-ray technologies to study human articulation patterns. The X-ray macrobeam speech corpus is considered to be an important research resource for modern phonetic research. His work contributed to the foundation of modern acoustic analyses of speech sounds, especially the acoustics of nasal consonants, proposing the notion of the “anti-formant”. His work also showed that consonant-to-vowel transition is perceptually more salient than vowel-to-consonant transition. In addition to his contribution to phonetic science, he wrote a review of “Syntactic Structures” by Noam Chomsky in 1963, thereby contributing to the introduction of generative linguistics in Japan. Later in his career, he proposed a model of speech articulation called “the C/D model”, in which phonological featural specifications are “Converted” and “Distributed” to several articulators. The C/D model is an explicit theory of how mental, phonological information is mapped onto actual physiological articulatory commands. This theory is currently being pursued by a number of phoneticists.

His first position was Research Assistant at The Kobayashi Institute of Physical Research, Kokubunzi, Tokyo from 1952 – 1958. He then served as Assistant Professor at the Research Laboratory of Communication Science in the University of Electrocommunications at Chōfu, Tokyo from 1958 to 1965. From 1958 to 1961 he worked at MIT as Division of Sponsored Research staff member at the Research Laboratory of Electronics (Speech Communication Group). At MIT he was supervised by Drs. Morris Halle and K. N. Stevens. This was followed by two years (1963 – 1965) as a Guest Researcher at the Royal Institute of Technology, Stockholm, Sweden, where he was supervised by Dr. Gunnar Fant. During this time, he conducted research that contributed to the foundation of modern acoustic analyses.

He obtained his D.Sc in Physics from the University of Tokyo in 1962. Starting in 1965, he served as a professor at the Research Institute of Logopedics and Phoniatrics in the faculty of medicine at the University of Tokyo. He served as the director of the Institute between 1969 and 1973, during which time he published many important phonetic research papers. Concurrently in 1973, he also was adjunct professor, Dept. of Linguistics, Faculty of Letters, at the University of Tokyo, and also chair of the Graduate Course in Physiology (in the Division of Medicine), the University of Tokyo. It was during this time that RILP became an active research center for speech science studies, focusing on developing highly advanced techniques and tools for studying articulation of speech, including fiberoptics, EMG (electromyography) and the X-Ray Microbeam. Some studies conducted at RILP during this time are considered to be foundational to modern phonetics science, and still cited in current phonetics papers.

In 1973, he moved to AT&T Bell Labs in Murray Hill, NJ, USA. At Bell Labs he served as the head of the Department of Linguistics and Speech Analysis Research until 1984, the head of Department of Linguistics and Artificial Intelligence Research until 1987, and the head of Department of Artificial Intelligence Research until 1988. During this time Fujimura worked with a number of scientists and is remembered for encouraging young researchers including Mark Liberman, Janet Pierrehumbert, William Poser, Mary Beckman, Marian Macchi, Sue Hertz, Jan Edwards, and Julia Hirschberg. Fujimura’s broad vision about the entire field of linguistics is evident in his impact on post-doc researchers at Bell Labs such as John McCarthy, a formal phonologist, and Barbara Partee, a formal semanticist.

In 1988, Fujimura moved to the Department of Speech & Hearing Science at Ohio State University where he worked until retiring as a Professor Emeritus in 2003. During his time at OSU, he was also a Member at the Center for Cognitive Science (1988 to 2003), and a Participating Professor at the Biomedical Engineering Center (1992 to 2003). In addition he was a periodic Guest Researcher at ATR/HIP in Japan from 1992 to 1996. From 1997 to 1998 he took sabbatical leave from OSU to be a Japan Society for the Promotion of Science Invitation Fellow at the Research Institute of Asian and African Languages and Cultures at the Tokyo University for Foreign Studies.

Fujimura served as a fellow for the International Institute for Advanced Studies from 2004 to 2006. It was during this time that Fujimura began to formulate the C/D model of speech articulation while mentoring researchers such as Reiner Wilhelms Tricarico, Chao-Min Wu, Donna Erickson, Kerrie Beechler Obert, Caroline Menezez, and Bryan Pardo.

After retirement from OSU, he was a researcher at the Center of Excellence (COE), Nagoya University from 2003 to 2004 working with professors K. Kakehi & F. Itakura. Fujimura then served as fellow at the International Institute for Advanced Studies, Kyoto, Japan from April 2004 to August 2006.

Fujimura believed strongly in diversity and inclusion in science. Through mentorship and encouragement Fujimura aided a younger generation of speech scientists. He encouraged the young generation to “Pay it Forward” with their own junior researchers, creating a perpetual positive cycle.

== Patents ==
As a basic researcher pioneering work on speech synthesis, Fujimura did not frequently patent his inventions.

Fujimura did patent his Speech transmission system from 1978, US 4170719 A. This machine created speech synthesis with voiced and unvoiced sounds produced differently.

One of his creations was the computer-tracking-based X-Ray microbeam system for recording human utterances. The first version of the machine was at University of Tokyo, built by JEOL (Nihon-Denshi KK). The second version was built at University of Wisconsin and was in use until 2009. They used extremely low doses of X-ray to track the movement of the tongue and oral chamber in order to study how humans uttered sounds. Both machines were used by generations of researchers to discover and to verify theories of human speech generation, and lead to the development of CAT scans.

== Personal life ==
Osamu Fujimura was born August 29, 1927. The Fujimura family is descended from the Miyamoto clan (源氏), remotely related to the samurai Minamoto Yoritomo (源頼朝), who founded the Kamakura Bakufu (military government site) as a Shōgun (将軍) in the 12th century. Yoritomo's grave is behind the Hachimangu 八幡宮 in Yukinoshita, Kamakura. He was survived by his second wife J.C. Williams, and four sons, Akira, Makoto, Wataru, and Itaru.
