= Nihonga =

Paintings made in accordance with traditional Japanese artistic conventions

Enbu (炎舞, Dancing in the Flames) by Gyoshū Hayami, 1925, Important Cultural Property. Yamatane Museum.

Nihonga (Japanese: 日本画) is a Japanese style of painting that typically uses mineral pigments, and occasionally ink, together with other organic pigments on silk or paper. The term was coined during the Meiji period (1868–1912) to differentiate it from its counterpart, known as Yōga (洋画) or Western-style painting. The term translates to "pictures in a Japanese style."

In the narrow sense, it refers to paintings that were developed during the 77 years from the Meiji Restoration to the end of World War II based on traditional Japanese techniques and styles, such as calligraphy and hand-painted painting, rather than oil painting. In contrast, oil paintings were called Yōga.

In a broader sense, the term can be extended to include works made before the Meiji Restoration and after World War II. In such cases, the term is often used with some ambiguity as to whether it refers to works that have Japanese characteristics in terms of subject matter or style despite being of Chinese origin, or whether it refers generally to drawings made in Japan before the arrival of oil painting techniques.

The former, Meiji-era Nihonga, began when Okakura Tenshin and Ernest Fenollosa sought to revive traditional Japanese painting in response to the rise of a new Western painting style, Yōga. Hashimoto Gahō, a painter of the Kano School, was the founder of the practical side of this revival movement. He did not simply paint Japanese-style paintings using traditional techniques, but revolutionized traditional Japanese painting by incorporating the perspective of Yōga and set the direction for the later Nihonga movement. As the first professor at the Tokyo Fine Arts School (now Tokyo University of the Arts), he trained many painters who would later be considered Nihonga masters, including Yokoyama Taikan, Shimomura Kanzan, Hishida Shunsō, and Kawai Gyokudō.

The term was already in use in the 1880s and a discussion of the context at the end of the Edo period is traced in Foxwell's monograph on Making Modern: Japanese-style Painting. Prior to then, from the early modern period on, paintings were classified by school: the Kanō school, the Maruyama-Shijō school, and the Tosa school of the yamato-e genre, for example.

== History ==
At about the time that the Tokyo Fine Arts School was founded, in 1887, art organizations began to form and to hold exhibitions. Through them, artists influenced each other, and the earlier schools merged and blended. With the additional influence of Western painting, today's nihonga emerged and developed.

Nihonga has gone through many phases of development since the Meiji period. The impetus for reinvigorating traditional painting by developing a more modern Japanese style came largely from many artist/educators, which included Shiokawa Bunrin, Kōno Bairei, Tomioka Tessai and art critics Okakura Tenshin and Ernest Fenollosa, who attempted to combat Meiji Japan's infatuation with Western culture by emphasizing to the Japanese the importance and beauty of native Japanese traditional arts. These two art critics, and in particular Tenshin who was called the father of modern Japanese art, championed the preservation of traditional art with innovation and synthesis with Western-style painting. Nihonga was thus not simply a continuation of older painting traditions viewed in this light. Moreover, stylistic and technical elements from several traditional schools, such as the Kanō-ha, Rinpa and Maruyama Ōkyo were blended together.

Some Western painting techniques were adopted, such as perspective and shading, in a bid to move away from the importance of the painted line from East Asian painting tradition. Because of this tendency to synthesize, it has become increasingly difficult to draw a distinct separation in either techniques or materials between Nihonga and Yōga.

The artist Tenmyouya Hisashi (b. 1966) has developed a new art concept in 2001 called "Neo-Nihonga".

=== Development outside Japan ===
Nihonga has a following around the world; notable Nihonga artists who are not based in Japan are Hiroshi Senju, American Makoto Fujimura, and Canadian Miyuki Tanobe.

Contemporary Nihonga was the mainstay of New York's Dillon Gallery between 1995 and 2015. The "golden age of post war Nihonga" from 1985 to 1993 produced global artists whose training in Nihonga has served as a foundation. Takashi Murakami, Hiroshi Senju, Norihiko Saito, Chen Wenguang, Keizaburo Okamura and Makoto Fujimura all came out of the distinguished Doctorate level curriculum at Tokyo University of the Arts. Most recently Pola Museum did a seminal survey in an exhibit which included Makoto Fujimura, Lee Ufan, Matazo Kayama, as well as Natsunosuke Mise, called "Shin Japanese Painting: Revolutionary Nihonga", curated by Hiroyuki Uchiro.

Fujimura's book "Art Is: A Journey into the Light" (Yale University Press, 2025) reintroduces Nihonga in a new light, highlighting its history and materials, as well as his descriptions and meditations of Tawaraya Sotatsu's "Waves at Matsushima", a seventeenth century seminal work in collection at Smithsonian National Museum of Asian Art, has been noted as the first English writing about the masterpiece.

== Materials ==
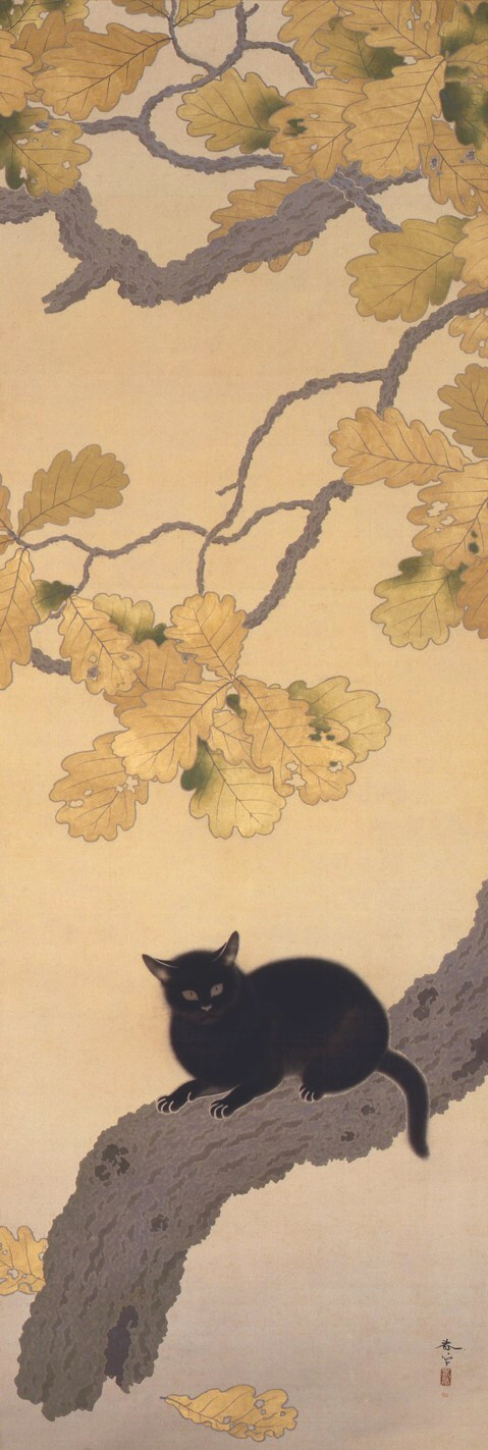
Kuroki Neko (黒き猫, Black Cat) by Hishida Shunsō, 1910, Important Cultural Property. Eisei Bunko Museum.

Nihonga are typically executed on washi (Japanese paper) or eginu (silk), using brushes. The paintings can be either monochrome or polychrome. If monochrome, typically sumi (Chinese ink) made from soot mixed with a glue from fishbone or animal hide is used. If polychrome, the pigments are derived from natural ingredients: minerals, shells, corals, and even semi-precious stones like malachite, azurite and cinnabar. The raw materials are powdered into 16 gradations from fine to sandy grain textures. A hide glue solution, called nikawa, is used as a binder for these powdered pigments. In both cases, water is used; hence nihonga is actually a water-based medium. Gofun (powdered calcium carbonate that is made from cured oyster, clam or scallop shells) is an important material used in nihonga. Different kinds of gofun are utilized as a ground, for under-painting, and as a fine white top color.

Initially, nihonga were produced for hanging scrolls (kakemono), hand scrolls (emakimono), sliding doors (fusuma) or folding screens (byōbu). However, most are now produced on paper stretched onto wood panels, suitable for framing. Nihonga paintings do not need to be put under glass. They are archival for thousands of years.

== Techniques ==
In monochrome Nihonga, the technique depends on the modulation of ink tones from darker through lighter to obtain a variety of shadings from near white, through grey tones to black and occasionally into greenish tones to represent trees, water, mountains or foliage. In polychrome Nihonga, great emphasis is placed on the presence or absence of outlines; typically outlines are not used for depictions of birds or plants. Occasionally, washes and layering of pigments are used to provide contrasting effects, and even more occasionally, gold or silver leaf may also be incorporated into the painting.

== Gallery ==
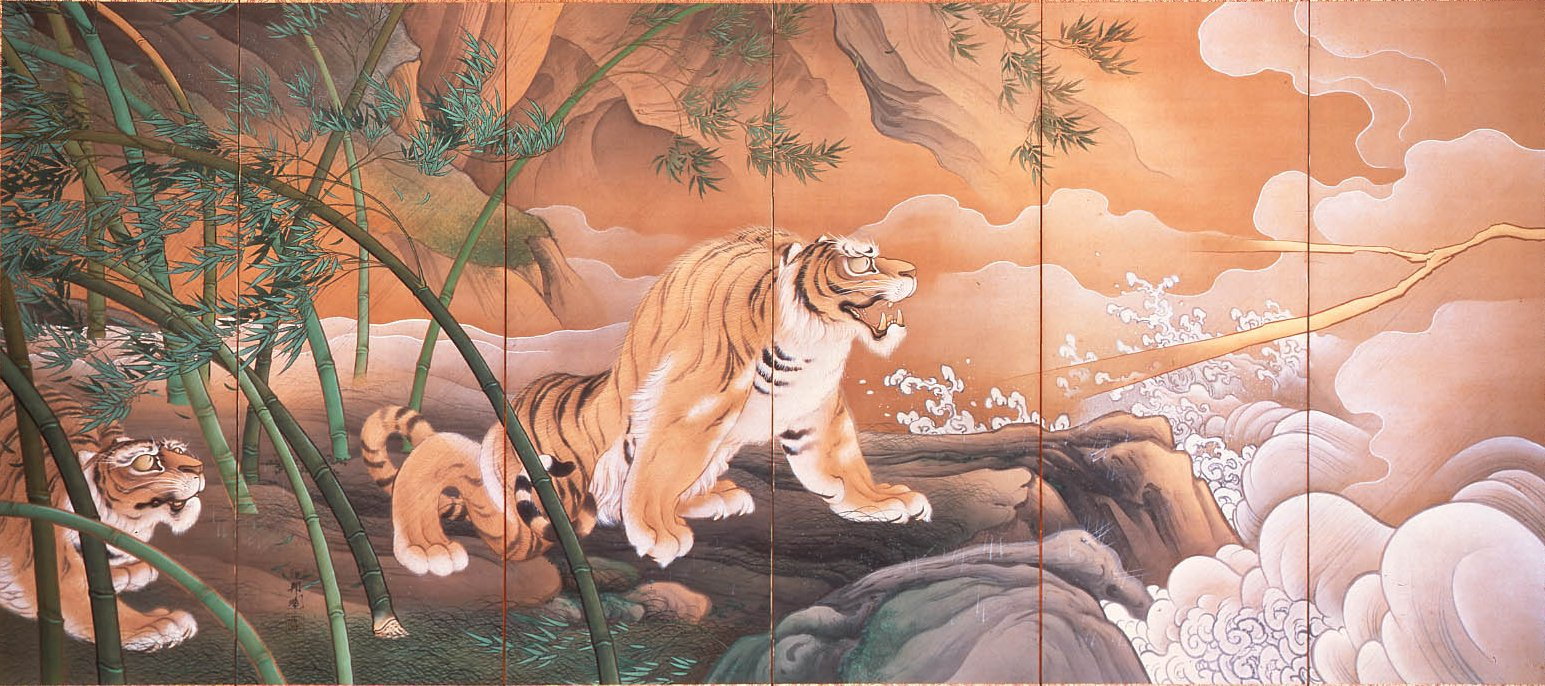
Left panel of the Ryūkozu (竜虎図, Dragon and tiger) by Hashimoto Gahō, 1895. Important Cultural Property. Seikadō Bunko Art Museum.

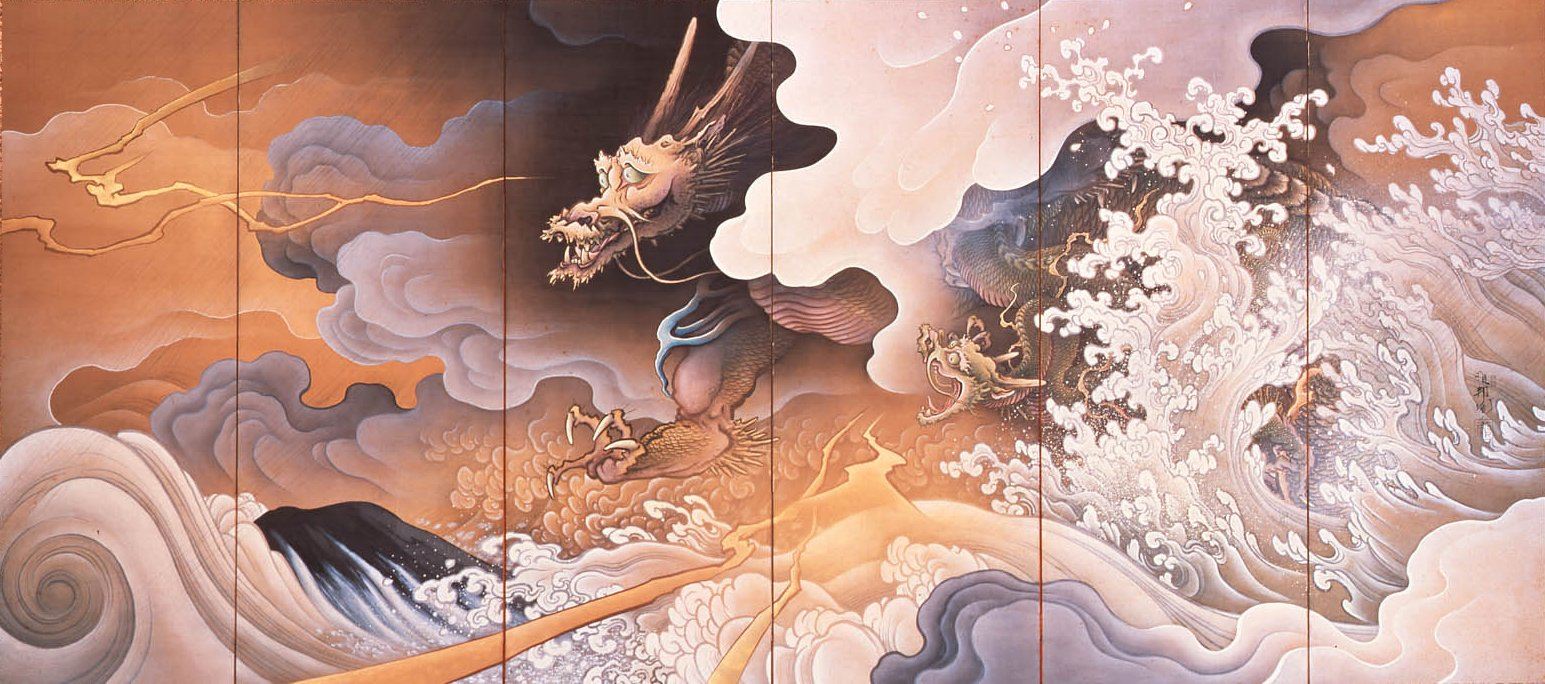
Right panel of the Ryūkozu (竜虎図, Dragon and tiger) by Hashimoto Gahō, 1895. Important Cultural Property. Seikadō Bunko Art Museum.
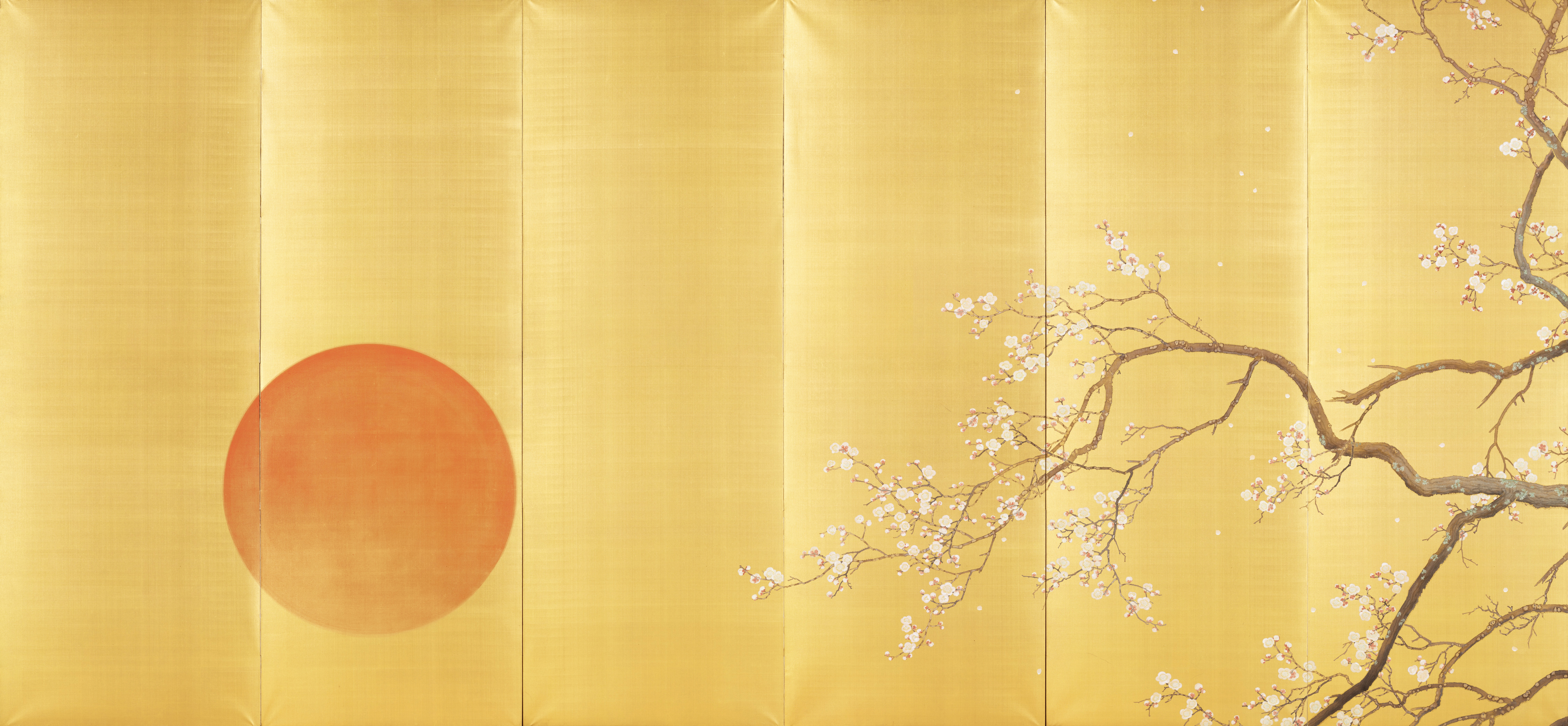
Left panel of the Yorobōshi (弱法師, Scene from Noh play Yorobōshi) by Shimomura Kanzan, 1915. Important Cultural Property. Tokyo National Museum.

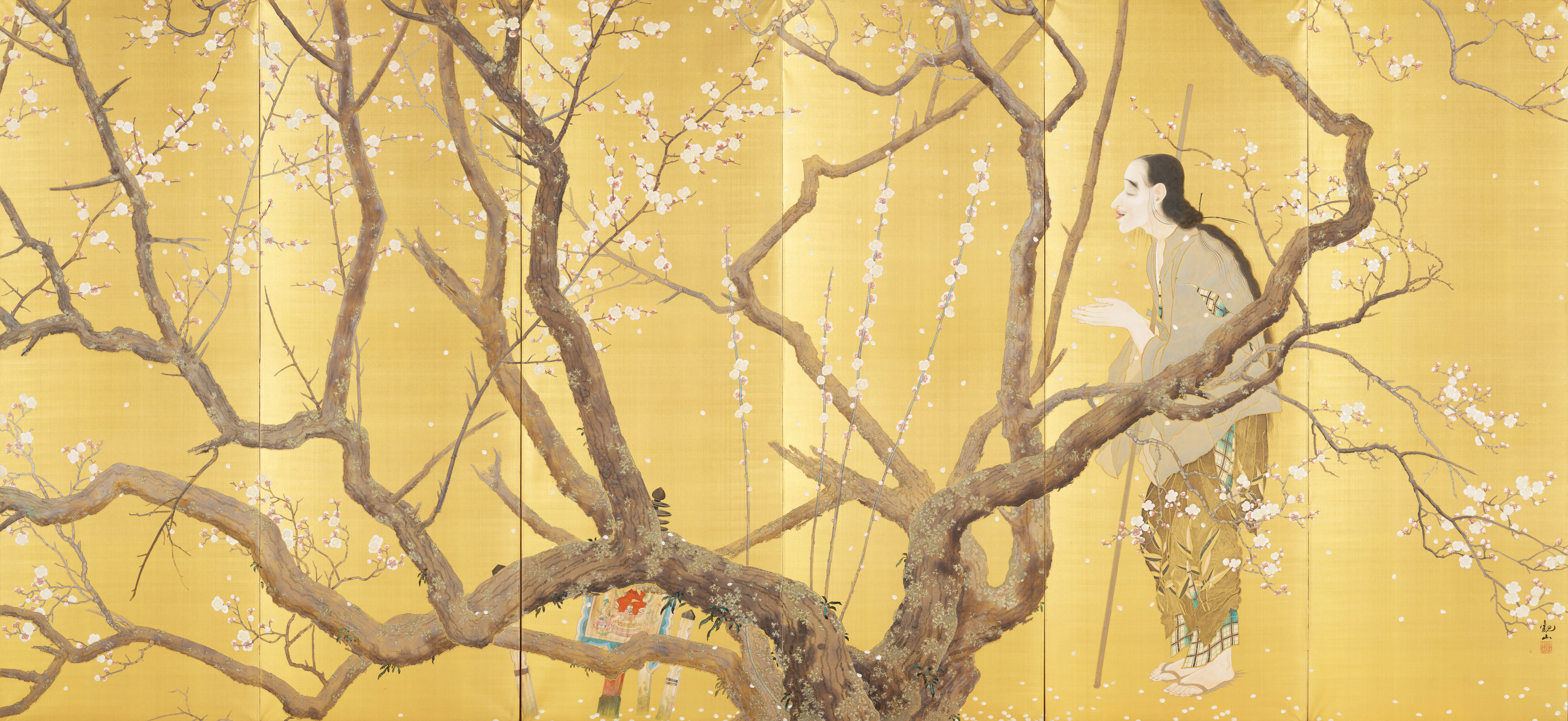
Right panel of the Yorobōshi (弱法師, Scene from Noh play Yorobōshi) by Shimomura Kanzan, 1915. Important Cultural Property. Tokyo National Museum.
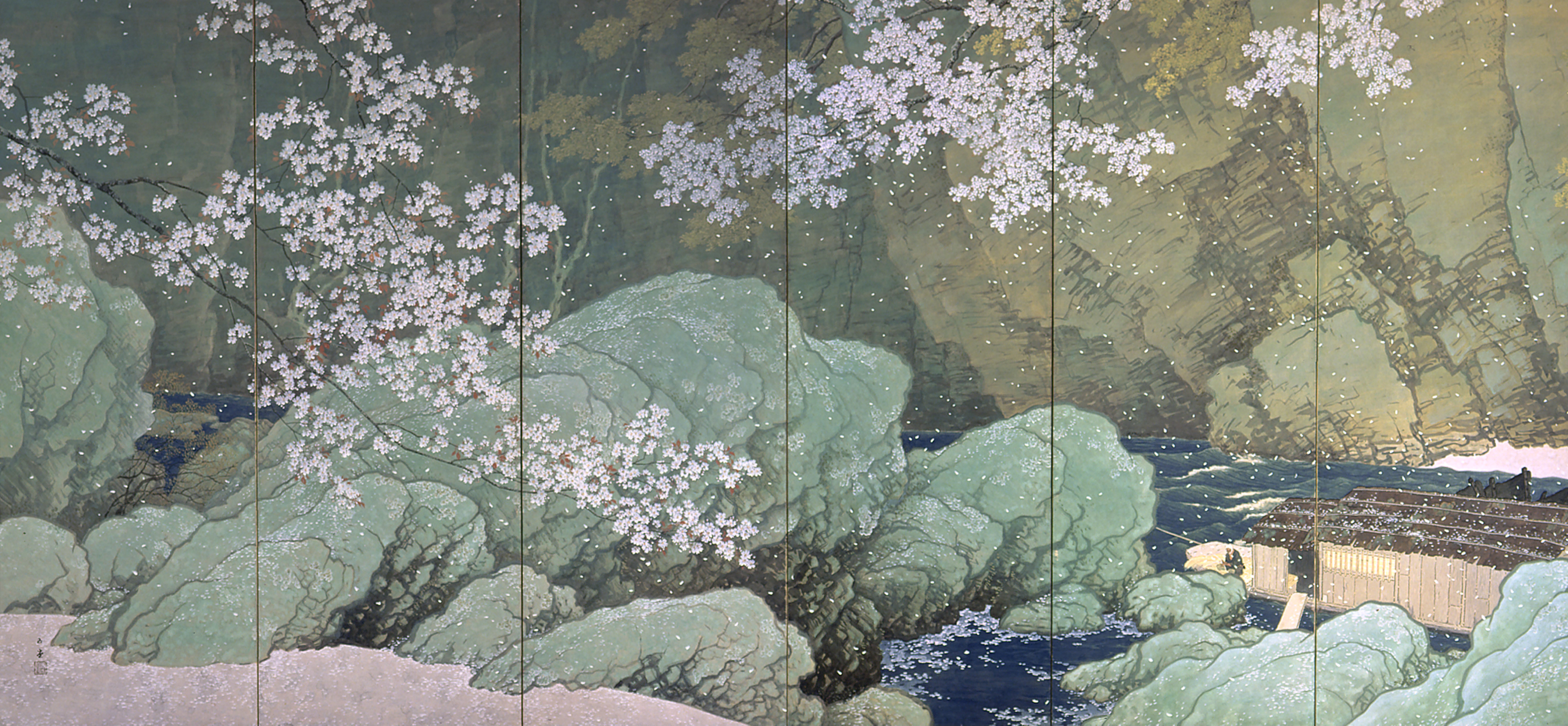
Left panel of the Yuku Haru (行く春, Parting Spring) by Kawai Gyokudō, 1916. Important Cultural Property. National Museum of Modern Art, Tokyo.

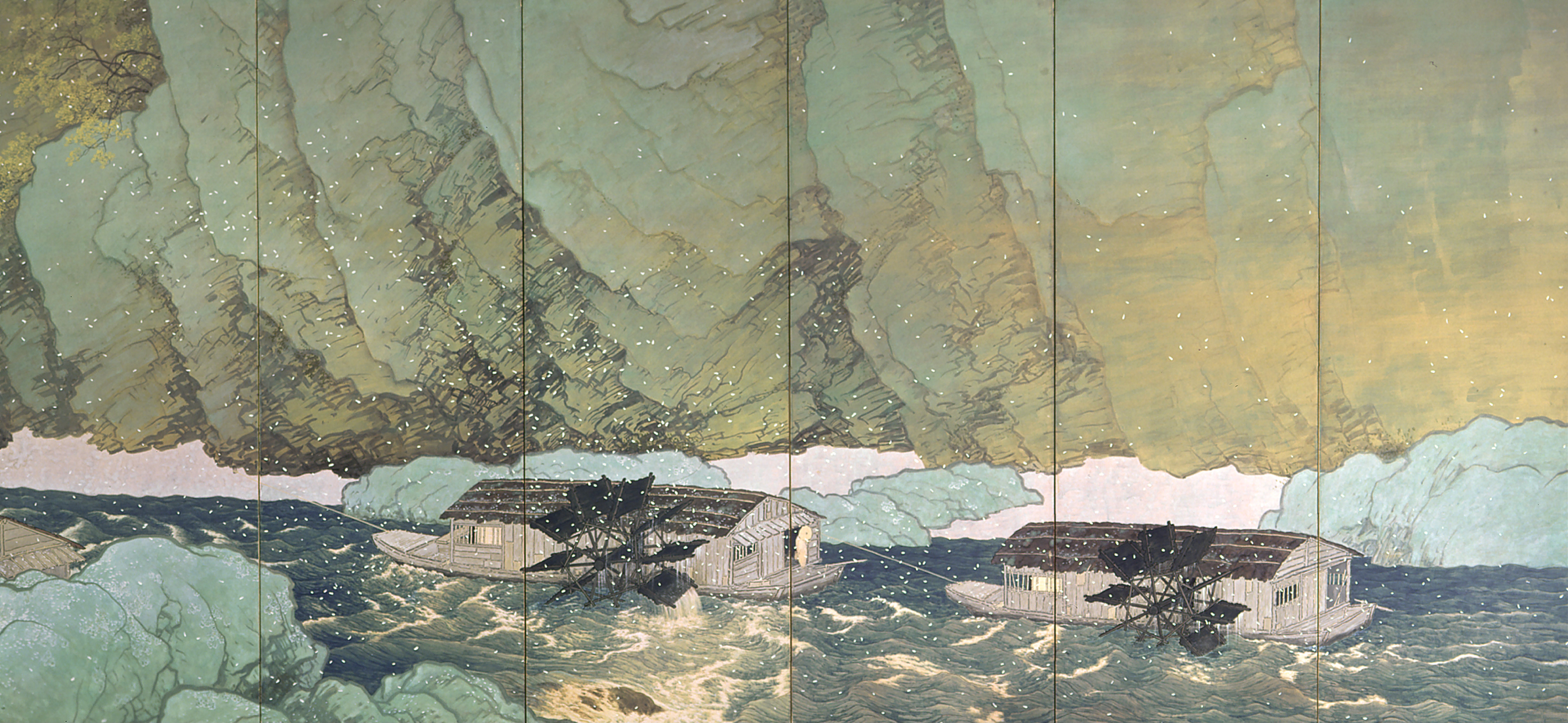
Right panel of the Yuku Haru (行く春, Parting Spring) by Kawai Gyokudō, 1916. Important Cultural Property. National Museum of Modern Art, Tokyo.
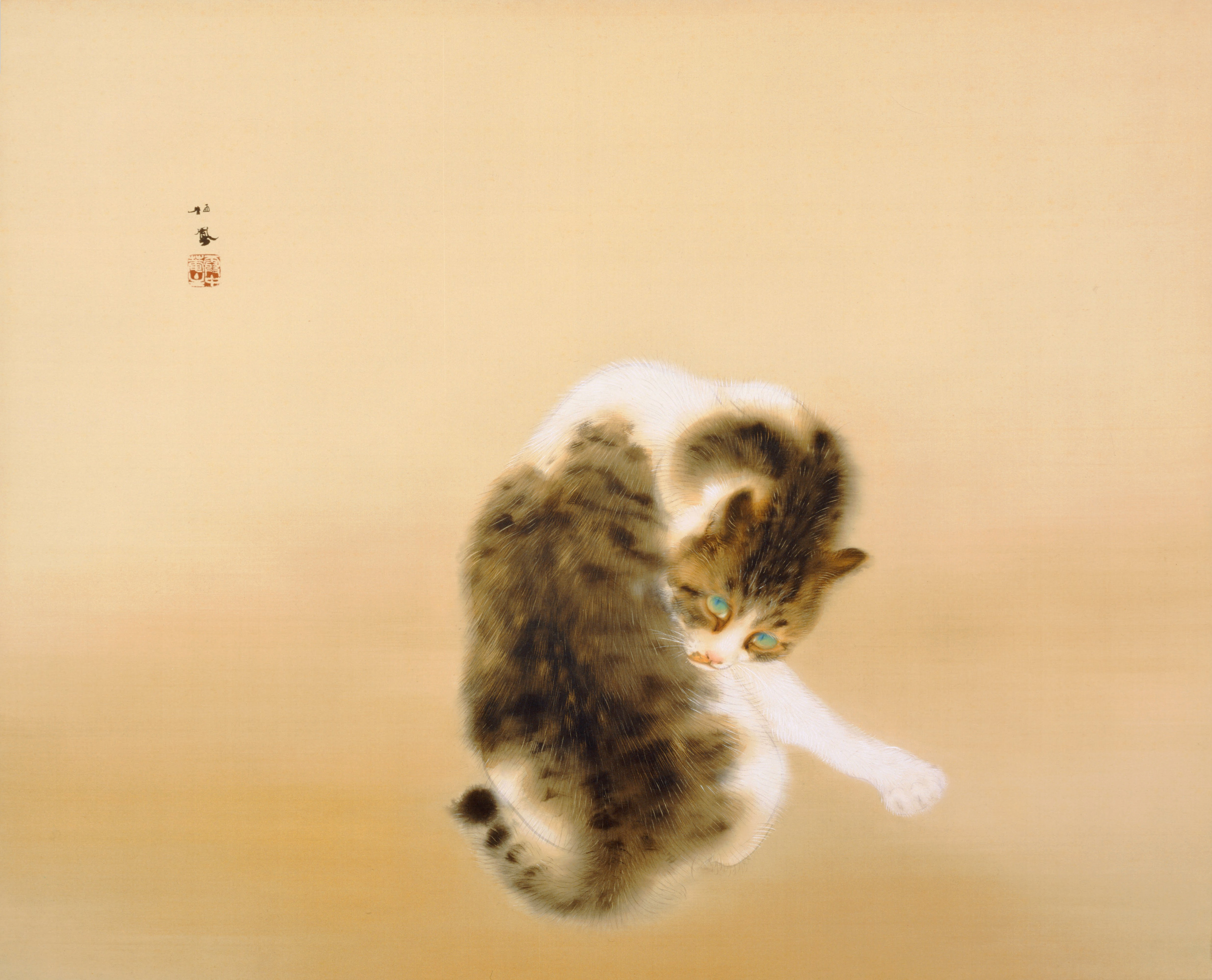
Madaraneko (斑猫, Tabby Cat) by Takeuchi Seihō, 1924. Important Cultural Property. Yamatane Museum.

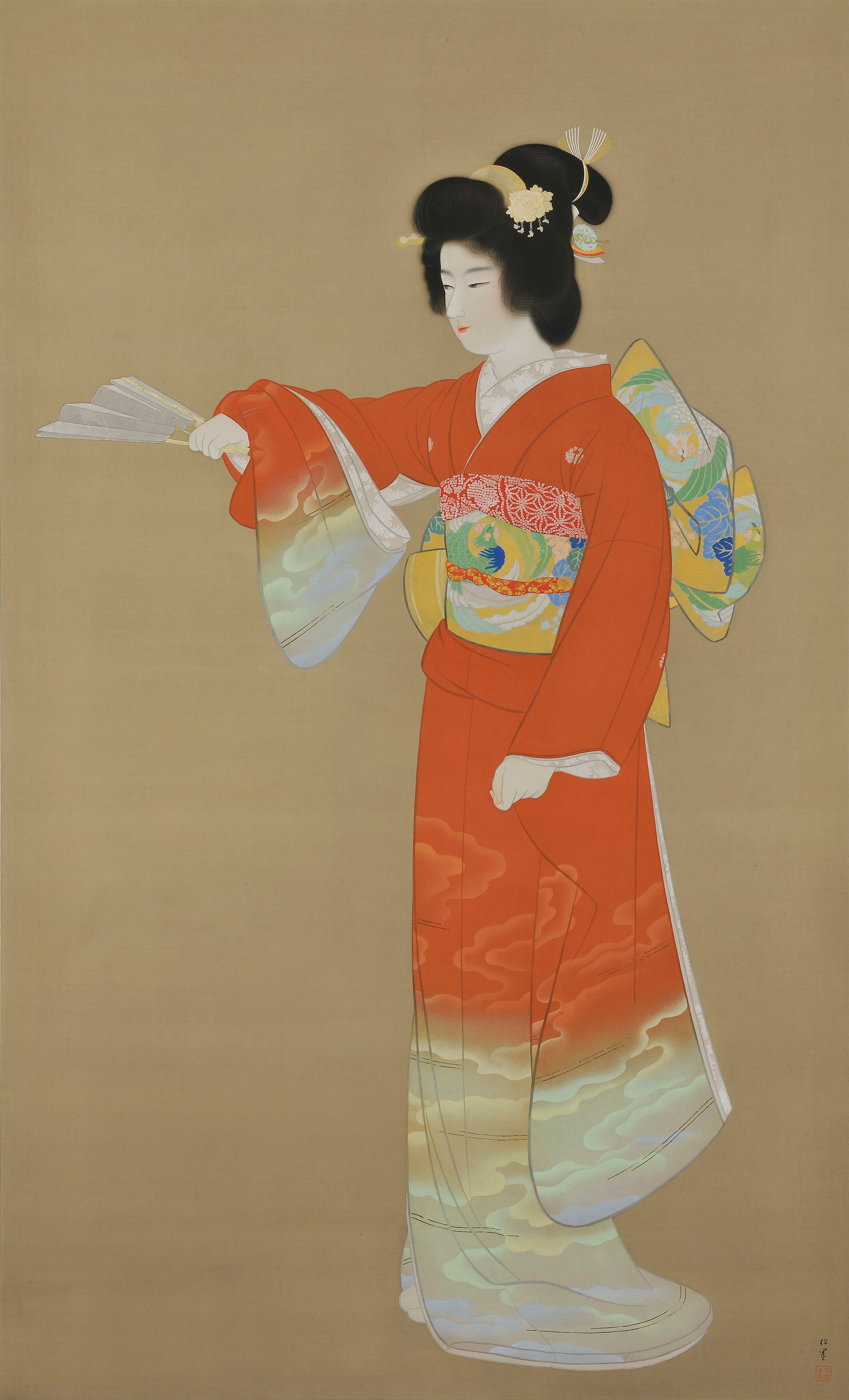
Jo no Mai (序の舞, Noh Dance Prelude) by Uemura Shōen, 1936. Important Cultural Property. The University Art Museum.
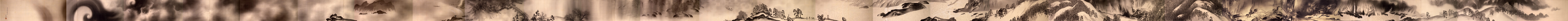
Seisei ruten (生々流転, Metempsychosis), by Yokoyama Taikan; ink on silk; 55.3 by 4,070 cm (1 ft 9.8 in by 133 ft 6.4 in); the narrative unfurls from right to left. 1923. Important Cultural Property. National Museum of Modern Art, Tokyo.

== See also ==
- List of Nihonga painters
- Nanga
