= Katō (surname) =

Katō, Kato, Katou or Katoh (加藤, characters for "add/increase" and "wisteria") is the 10th most common Japanese surname.

== Notable people with the surname ==
- Ai Kato (加藤 あい; born 1982), Japanese actress and idol
- Akemi Kato (加藤 明美; born 1970), Japanese field hockey player
- Akiko Kato (加藤 彰子; born 1988), Japanese field hockey player
- Akiko Kato (curler) (加藤 彰子; born 1978), Japanese curler and coach
- Atsushi Kato (加藤 充志; born 1974), Japanese Go player
- Ayuko Kato (加藤 鮎子; born 1979), Japanese politician
- Cha Katō (加藤 茶; born 1943), Japanese comedian, actor and musician
- Chihiro Kato (volleyball) (加藤 千尋; born 1988), Japanese volleyball player
- Dai Kato (加藤 大; born 2002), Japanese Yokohama DeNA Baystars baseball player
- Daijiro Kato (加藤 大治郎; 1976–2003), Japanese motorcycle racer
- Daishi Kato (加藤 大志; born 1983), Japanese footballer
- Daisuke Katō (加東 大介; 1911–1975), Japanese actor
- Daisuke Kato (baseball) (加藤 大輔; born 1980), Japanese baseball player
- Katō Danzō (加藤 段蔵; c. 1503 – 1569), Japanese ninja
- Eikichi Kato (加藤 榮吉; 1897–1946), Imperial Japanese Navy officer
- Eizō Katō (加藤 栄三; 1906–1972), Japanese painter
- Emiri Katō (加藤 英美里; born 1983), Japanese voice actress
- Katō Enao (加藤 枝直; 1693–1785), Japanese poet
- Fujiko Kato (加藤 富士子; born 1946), Japanese cross-country skier
- Funky Kato (born 1978), Japanese singer-songwriter
- Go Kato (加藤 剛; 1938–2018), Japanese entertainer and actor
- Hajime Katō (disambiguation), multiple people
- Haruka Kato (加藤 悠; born 1989), Japanese gravure idol, television personality and professional wrestler
- Hideji Katō (加藤 秀司; born 1948), Japanese baseball player
- Hidenori Kato (加藤 秀典; born 1981), Japanese footballer
- Hifumi Katō (加藤 一二三; born 1940), Japanese shogi player
- Hiroki Kato (加藤 広樹; born 1986), Japanese footballer
- Hiroki Katoh (加藤 寛規; born 1968), Japanese racing driver and team manager
- Hiroshi Kato (加藤 寛; born 1951), Japanese footballer and manager
- Hiroshi Kato (aikido) (加藤 弘; 1935–2012), Japanese aikidoka
- Katō Hiroyuki (加藤 弘之; 1836–1916), Japanese academic and politician
- Hisaki Kato (加藤 久輝; born 1982), Japanese mixed martial artist and kickboxer
- Hisashi Kato (加藤 久; born 1956), Japanese footballer and manager
- Issei Kato (加藤 壱盛, born 2003), Japanese footballer
- Izumi Kato (加藤 和; born 1990), Japanese swimmer
- Izumi Kato (artist) (加藤 泉; born 1969), Japanese contemporary artist
- Joji Kato (加藤 条治; born 1985), Japanese speed skater
- Jun Kato (加藤 純; born 1980), Japanese tennis player
- Junichi Kato (加藤 順一; born 1935), Japanese rower
- Junichi Kato (YouTuber) (加藤 純一, born 1985), Japanese streamer
- Junya Kato (加藤 潤也; born 1994), Japanese footballer
- Kanji Kato (加藤 寛治; 1870–1939), Japanese naval officer
- Kaori Kato (born 1977), Japanese women cricketer
- Katsunobu Katō (加藤 勝信; born 1955), Japanese politician
- Kazue Kato (加藤和恵; born 1980), Japanese manga artist
- Kazuki Kato (加藤 和樹; born 1984), Japanese actor and singer
- Kazuya Kato (加藤 和也; born 1952), Japanese mathematician
- Kazuyo Kato (加藤 一義; 1932–2016), Japanese sport shooter
- Kei Katō (加藤 圭, born 1991), Japanese women's professional shogi player
- Keisuke Kato (加藤 慶祐; born 1988), Japanese actor
- Kento Kato (加藤 健人; born 1995), Japanese footballer
- Kenzō Katō (加藤 賢三; born 1980), Japanese sport wrestler
- Katō Kiyomasa (加藤 清正; 1562–1611), Japanese daimyō
- Kiyomi Kato (disambiguation), multiple people
- Kohei Kato (加藤 恒平; born 1989), Japanese footballer
- Koichi Kato (disambiguation), multiple people
- Koken Kato (加藤 弘堅; born 1989), Japanese footballer
- Konatsu Kato (加藤 小夏; born 1999), Japanese actress
- Kosuke Kato (加藤 康介; born 1978), Japanese baseball player
- Koyuki Kato (加藤 小雪; born 1976), better known as Koyuki, Japanese model and actress
- Kunio Katō (加藤 久仁生; born 1977), Japanese animator
- Kyōhei Katō (加藤 恭平; 1909–1983), Japanese photographer
- Masaaki Kato (加藤 正明; born 1958), Japanese footballer
- Masako Kato (加藤 雅子; born 1965), Japanese figure skater
- Masaru Kato (加藤 大; born 1991), Japanese footballer
- Masashi Kato (加藤 真志; born 1970), Japanese swimmer
- Masato Kato (加藤 正人; born 1963), Japanese game developer and scenario writer
- Masaya Kato (加藤 雅也; born 1963), Japanese actor
- Masayo Kato (加藤 正世; 1898–1967), Japanese entomologist
- Masayoshi Kato (加藤 政義; born 1987), Japanese baseball player
- Midori Katō (加藤 みどり; born 1939), Japanese voice actress
- Mikiko Kato (加藤 美起子; born 1954), Japanese handball player
- Miliyah Kato (加藤 ミリヤ; born 1988), Japanese singer-songwriter
- Minami Kato (加藤 美南; born 1999), Japanese idol and singer
- Mitsuhiko Kato (加藤 三彦; born 1962), Japanese basketball coach
- Mitsuo Kato (加藤 光雄; born 1953), Japanese footballer
- Katō Mitsuyasu (加藤 光泰; 1537–1593), Japanese samurai and daimyō
- Miyoshi Kato (加藤 美善; born 1962), Japanese speed skater
- Miyu Kato (disambiguation), multiple people
- Momoko Katō (加藤 桃子; born 1993), Japanese shogi player
- Nanae Katō (加藤 奈々絵; born 1976), Japanese voice actress
- Naoyuki Kato (加藤 直之; born 1952), Japanese illustrator
- Natsuki Katō (加藤 夏希; born 1985), Japanese actress
- Nei Kato (加藤 寧), Japanese engineer
- Nobuhiro Kato (加藤 順大; born 1984), Japanese footballer
- Nobuya Kato (加藤 修也; born 1995), Japanese sprinter
- Nobuyuki Kato (加藤 信幸; 1920–?), Japanese footballer
- Noriko Katō (加藤 紀子; born 1973), Japanese singer and actress
- Nozomu Kato (加藤 望; born 1969), Japanese footballer
- Rena Kato (加藤 玲奈; born 1997), Japanese singer and idol
- Ricky Kato (born 1994), Australian golfer
- Riona Kato (加藤 利緒菜; born 1998), Japanese figure skater
- Ryōhei Katō (加藤 凌平; born 1993), Japanese gymnast
- Rosa Kato (加藤 ローサ; born 1985), Japanese actress and model
- Ryo Kato (加藤 諒; born 1990), Japanese actor and television personality
- Ryōzō Katō (加藤 良三; born 1941), Japanese lawyer and diplomat
- Ryuji Kato (加藤 竜二; born 1969), Japanese footballer
- Sachiko Kato (born 2000), Japanese rugby union player
- Katō Sadakichi (加藤 定吉; 1861–1927), Imperial Japanese Navy admiral
- Sakuko Kato (加藤 作子; born 1955), Japanese Paralympic swimmer
- Satori Kato, Japanese chemist
- Sawao Katō (加藤 沢男; born 1946), Japanese gymnast
- Seiko Kato Behr (née Seiko Kato; 1941–2010), Japanese-born American artist
- Seishiro Kato (加藤 清史郎; born 2001), Japanese actor
- Seizō Katō (加藤 精三; 1927–2014), Japanese voice actor
- Katō Shidzue (加藤 シヅエ; 1897–2001), Japanese activist and politician
- Shigeaki Kato (加藤 成亮; born 1987), Japanese idol and singer
- Shiho Katō (加藤 史帆; born 1998), Japanese idol and model
- Shin Kato (加藤 信; 1891–1952), Japanese Go player
- Shohei Kato (加藤 翔平; born 1991), Japanese baseball player
- Shota Kato (加藤 創太; born 1999), better known as SO-SO, Japanese beatboxer and looper
- Shuichi Kato (disambiguation), multiple people
- Sogen Kato (加藤 宗現; 1899 – c. 1978)
- Sonoko Kato (加藤 園子; born 1976), Japanese professional wrestler
- Katō Tadaaki (加藤 忠明), Japanese samurai
- Tadamasa Kato (加藤 忠正; born 1944), Japanese rower
- Tadashi Kato (加藤 忠; 1935–2020), Japanese cyclist
- Tai Kato (加藤 泰; 1916–1985), Japanese film director and screenwriter
- Taihei Kato (加藤 大平; born 1984), Japanese Nordic combined skier
- Taiki Kato (加藤 大樹; born 1993), Japanese footballer
- Taka Kato (加藤 鷹; born 1959), Japanese pornographic film actor
- Katō Takaaki (加藤 高明; 1860–1926), Japanese politician, diplomat and Prime Minister of Japan
- Takako Katō (disambiguation), multiple people
- Takashi Kato (加藤 嵩士; born 1989), Japanese handball player
- Takayuki Kato (加藤 貴之; born 1992), Japanese baseball player
- Takeharu Kato (加藤 武治; born 1978), Japanese baseball player
- Takehiro Kato (加藤 豪宏; born 1974), Japanese footballer
- Takehisa Kato (加藤 武久; born 1941), Japanese cyclist
- Takeshi Katō (disambiguation), multiple people
- Takuma Kato (加藤 匠馬; born 1992), Japanese baseball player
- Tateo Katō (加藤 建夫; 1903–1942), Japanese World War II flying ace
- Tatsuhito Katoh (加藤 竜人; born 1976), Japanese baseball player
- Tatsuya Kato (加藤 達也; born 1980), Japanese composer
- Tatsuya Kato (journalist) (加藤 達也; born 1966), Japanese journalist
- Tetsuji Kato (加藤 鉄史; born 1977), Japanese mixed martial artist
- Tōichi Katō (加藤 東一; 1916–1996), Japanese painter
- Tokiko Kato (加藤 登紀子; born 1943), Japanese singer-songwriter and actress
- Tomoaki Kato (加藤 友朗; born 1963), Japanese surgeon
- Tomoe Kato (加藤 與惠; born 1978), Japanese women's footballer
- Tomohiro Katō (加藤 智大; 1982–2022), Japanese mass murderer
- Katō Tomosaburō (加藤 友三郎; 1861–1923), Imperial Japanese Navy admiral, politician and Prime Minister of Japan
- Toshikazu Kato (加藤 寿一; born 1981), Japanese footballer
- Toshiyuki Kato (加藤 敏幸; born 1949), Japanese politician
- Tosio Kato (加藤 敏夫; 1917–1999), Japanese mathematician
- Tsubasa Kato (加藤 翼; born 1984), Japanese contemporary artist
- Tsutomu Kato (加藤 孟; 1926-2011), cofounder of Korg
- Yasuaki Kato (加藤 泰明; born 1976), Japanese footballer
- Katō Yasuaki (加藤 泰秋; 1846–1926), Japanese daimyō
- Yasuhiro Kato (加藤 康弘; born 1986), Japanese footballer
- Yoichi Kato (加藤 陽一; born 1976), Japanese volleyball player
- Yoko Kato (加藤 庸子; born 1952), Japanese neurosurgeon
- Yoshi Katō (加藤 嘉; 1913–1988), Japanese actor
- Katō Yoshiaki (加藤 嘉明; 1563–1631), Japanese daimyō
- Yoshikazu Katō (加藤 義一; born 1972), Japanese film director and screenwriter
- Yoshio Kato (加藤 好男; born 1957), Japanese footballer
- Yoshiyuki Kato (加藤 善之; born 1964), Japanese footballer and manager
- Yuji Kato (加藤 裕司; born 1978), Japanese Paralympic judoka
- Yuka Kato (加藤 ゆか; born 1986), Japanese swimmer
- Yūka Kato (加藤 夕夏; born 1997), Japanese idol and singer
- Yuki Kato (born 1995), Indonesian actress, model, television presenter
- Yukiko Kato (1936–2024), Japanese writer
- Yuria Katō (加藤 結李愛; born 2003), Japanese shogi player
- Yurie Kato (加藤 友里恵; born 1987), Japanese triathlete
- Yusuke Kato (加藤 友介; born 1986), Japanese footballer
- Yuumi Kato (加藤 遊海; born 1996), Japanese model, actress and beauty pageant winner

== Fictional characters ==
- Kato (The Green Hornet) (加藤), a character in the Green Hornet series
- Go Kato, a character in the manga series Someday's Dreamers
- Griffin Kato, a character in the manga series Rave Master
- Juri Katou (Jeri Katou in all English dubs) (加藤 樹莉), a character in the anime series Digimon Tamers
- Kachiro Kato (加藤 勝郎), a character in the manga series Prince of Tennis
- Kazumi Kato, a character in The Order of the Stick webcomic
- Hazuki Katou (加藤 葉月), a character in the light novel and anime series Sound! Euphonium
- Marika Katō (加藤 茉莉香), protagonist of the light novel series Bodacious Space Pirates
- Masaji Kato (加藤 政二), a character in the video game Shadow Hearts: Covenant
- Masaru Kato (加藤 勝), a character in the manga series Gantz
- Megumi Kato (加藤 恵), a character in the light novel series Saekano: How to Raise a Boring Girlfriend
- Otome Katou (加藤 乙女), a character in the visual novel School Days
- Saburo Kato (加藤 三郎), a character in the anime series Space Battleship Yamato
- Yakumo "Cloud" Kato (加藤 クラウド 八雲), a character in the tokusatsu series Shuriken Sentai Ninninger
- Yasunori Katō (加藤 保憲), protagonist of the novel series Teito Monogatari
- Yue Kato (加藤 故), a character in the manga series Angel Sanctuary
- Yuichiro Kato (加藤 雄一郎), a character in the manga series Doubt!
- Haru Kato (加藤 春), a character in the anime series The Millionaire Detective Balance: Unlimited
