= Kyōhei =

- Gender: Male

Origin
- Origin: Japanese
- Meaning: Different meanings depending on the kanji used

Kyōhei, Kyohei or Kyouhei (written: 恭平, 京平, 喬平, 亨平 or 恭兵) is a masculine Japanese given name. Notable people with the name include:

- Kyohei Inukai (born 1886) (1886–1954), American artist
- Kyōhei Katō (加藤 恭平; 1909–1983), Japanese photographer
- Kyohei Inukai (born 1913) (1913–1985), American artist
- Kyohei Fujita (藤田 喬平; 1921–2004), Japanese artist
- Kyōhei Tsutsumi (筒美 京平; 1940-2020), Japanese composer and record producer
- Kyōhei Shibata (柴田 恭兵; born 1951), Japanese actor
- Kyohei Mikami (三上 恭平; born 1973), Japanese professional wrestler
- Kyōhei Ishiguro (イシグロキョウヘイ; born 1980), Japanese director
- Kyohei Noda (野田 恭平; born 1981), Japanese footballer
- Kyohei Morita (森田 恭平; born 1984), Japanese rugby union player
- Kyohei Iwasaki (岩崎 恭平; born 1986), Japanese baseball player
- Kyōhei Kamezawa (亀澤 恭平; born 1988), Japanese baseball player
- Kyohei Sugiura (杉浦 恭平; born 1989), Japanese footballer
- Kyohei Nakamura (中村 恭平; born 1989), Japanese baseball player
- Kyohei Yamagata (山形 恭平; born 1981), Japanese footballer
- Kyohei Noborizato (登里 亨平; born 1990), Japanese footballer
- Kyohei Sorita (反田恭平; born 1994), Japanese classical pianist

== Fictional characters ==
- Kyohei Takano, a character in the manga series The Wallflower
