= Kyohei Inukai =

Kyohei Inukai may refer to one of 2 deceased artists:

- Kyohei Inukai (born 1886)
- Kyohei Inukai (born 1913)
