= Inukai =

Inukai (written: 犬養 or 犬飼) is a Japanese surname. Notable people with the surname include:

- Atsuhiro Inukai (犬飼 貴丈; born 1994), Japanese actor
- Kyohei Inukai (1886–1954), Japanese-American painter
- Kyohei Inukai (1913–1985), Japanese-American artist
- Michiko Inukai (犬養 道子; 1921–2017), Japanese writer and philanthropist
- Motoaki Inukai (犬飼 基昭; born 1942), Japanese footballer
- Takashi Inukai (犬養 孝; 1907–1998), Japanese literature academic
- Takeru Inukai (犬養 健; 1886–1960), Japanese politician and writer
- Tomoya Inukai (犬飼 智也; born 1993), Japanese footballer
- Tsuyoshi Inukai (犬養 毅; 1855–1932), Japanese politician and Prime Minister of Japan

== Fictional characters ==
- Inukai (犬養), a character from the manga/anime series Flying Witch
- Karen Inukai (犬飼 加恋), a character from the web manga series My Life as Inukai-san's Dog
- Komugi and Iroha Inukai (犬飼こむぎ, 犬飼いろは), major characters from the anime series Wonderful Pretty Cure!
- Kosuke Inukai (犬飼 虎輔), a character from the manga/live-action television series Science Fell In Love, So I Tried to Prove It
- Youko and Tsuyoshi Inukai (犬飼陽子, 犬飼剛), characters from the anime series Wonderful Pretty Cure!

== Places ==
- Inukai, Ōita, a former town in Ōno District, Ōita, Japan
- Inukai Station, a railway station in Ōita Prefecture
