= List of Intangible Cultural Properties of Japan (Gifu) =

This list is of the Intangible Cultural Properties of Japan in the Prefecture of Gifu.

== National Cultural Properties ==
As of 1 July 2015, four Important Intangible Cultural Properties have been designated, being of national significance.

=== Craft Techniques ===
Property	Holder	Comments	Image	Ref.
Hon-Minoshi 本美濃紙; Hon-Minoshi	Hon-Minoshi Preservation Society (本美濃紙保存会)	the handmade paper of Mino is recorded in Engishiki and referenced in the inscription of "Washi, craftsmanship of traditional Japanese hand-made paper" on the UNESCO Representative List of the Intangible Cultural Heritage of Humanity		
Shino 志野; Shino	Suzuki Osamu (鈴木藏)	ceramic tradition dating from the Momoyama period		
Seto-guro 瀬戸黒; Seto-guro	Katō Kōzō (加藤孝造)	ceramic tradition dating from the Momoyama period; the black wares are removed from the kiln during firing and doused with water		
Monsha 紋紗; Monsha	Tsuchiya Yoshinori (土屋順紀)	textile tradition		

== Prefectural Cultural Properties ==
As of 2 March 2015, five properties have been designated at a prefectural level.

=== Craft Techniques ===
Property	Holder	Comments	Image	Ref.
Mino Tradition of Japanese Swordsmithing 美濃伝日本刀鍛錬技法; Mino-den nihontō tanren gihō	Mino Japanese Swordsmithing Preservation Society (美濃伝日本刀鍛錬技法保持者会)			
Gujō Indigo Dyeing 郡上本染; Gujō honzome	Watanabe Shōkichi (渡辺庄吉)			
Shino 志野; Shino	Katō Kōzō (加藤孝造), Wakao Toshisada (若尾利貞), Hayashi Shōtarō (林正太郎)			
Ki-Seto 黄瀬戸 ki-Seto	Andō Hidetake (安藤日出武)	yellow Seto		
Oribe 織部; Oribe	Tamaki Yasuo (玉置保夫)			

== Municipal Cultural Properties ==
As of 1 May 2014, thirty properties have been designated at a municipal level.
