= Katosan =

Katosan may refer to the following entities :

- Katosan State, a former princely state in Mahi Kantha
  - its seat, now a village in Mehsana District, Gujarat
- Katosan Thana, a neighbouring separate jurisdiction in Mahi Kantha

== See also ==
- Kato (-san), a Japanese surname
