= Hirasawa Kurō =

Japanese samurai and potter

Hirasawa Kurō (平澤九朗 1772–1840) was a Japanese samurai and potter during the late Edo period from Owari Province. He produced Shino ware tea utensils using the potter's wheel.

His style was influenced by the tastes at the Owari Tokugawa court at Nagoya Castle which produced Ofukei ware. He was followed by a successor with the same name. One of his students was Masaki Sōzaburō.

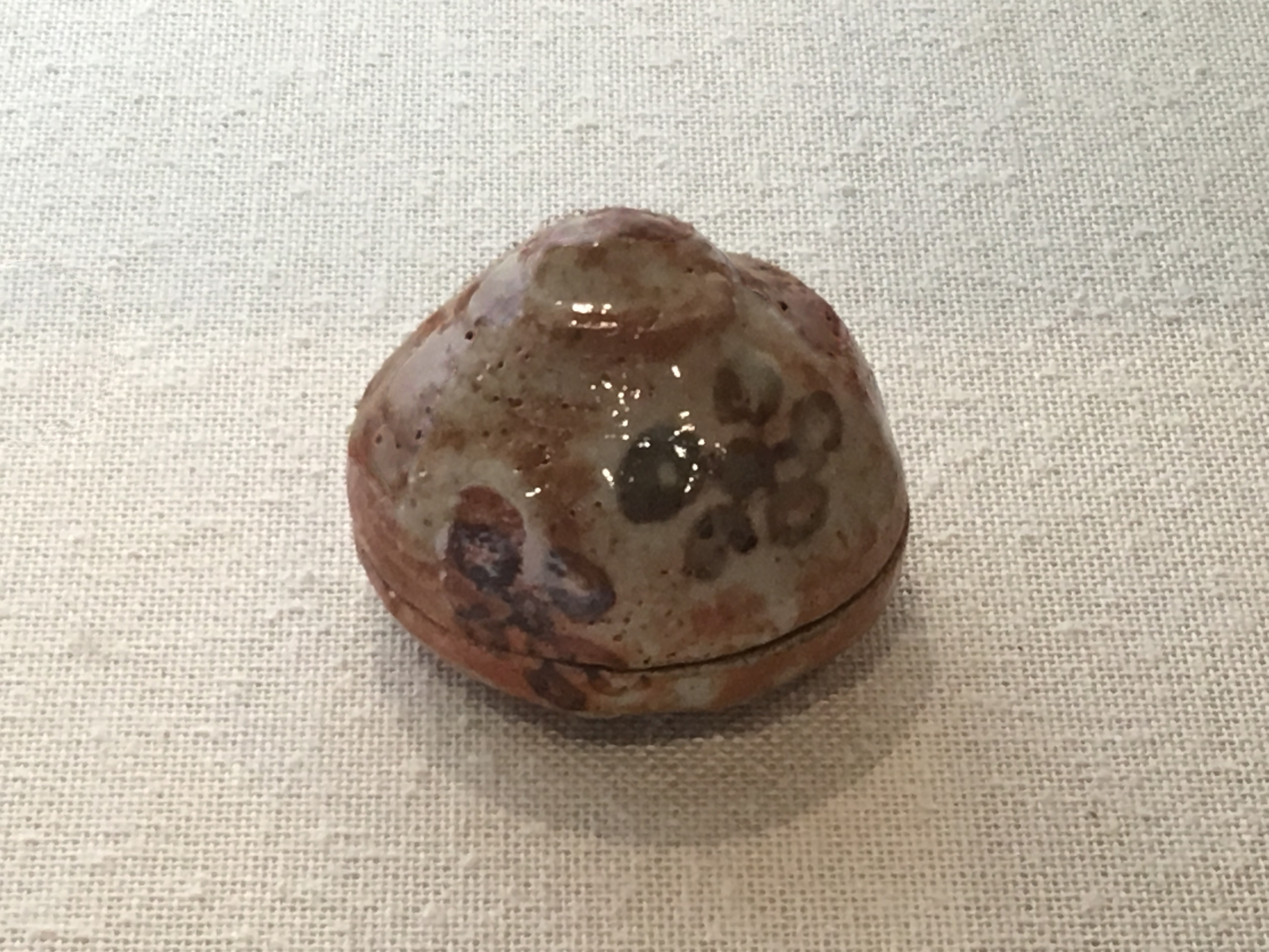
Shino ware incense container (kōgō) in hōju jewel shape, by Hirasawa Kurō I, Edo period, 18th-19th century
