= Masaki Sōzaburō =

Japanese samurai and potter

Masaki Sōzaburō (正木惣三郎; 1801–1850) was a Japanese samurai and potter during the Edo period from Owari Province.

== Biography ==
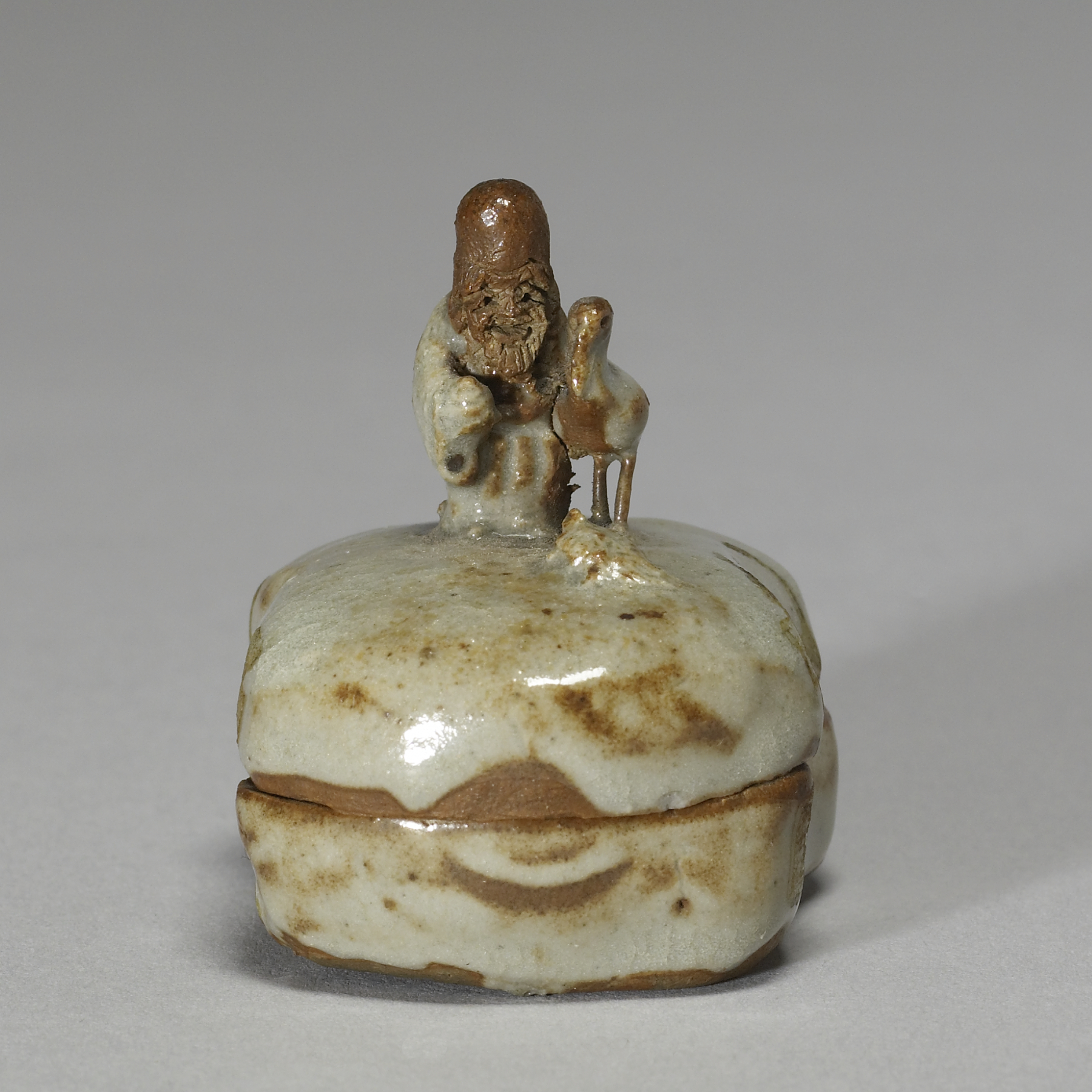
Shino ware incense container (kōgō) with sculpted figures of Jurōjin with a crane and a tortoise in feldspar glaze by Masaki Sōzaburō, late Edo period, early 19th century

He studied under Hirasawa Kurō and made mainly Shino ware or Kiseto tea utensils.

He was appointed as pottery maker by the 11th Owari lord Tokugawa Nariharu, and served as an aide to the 12th lord Tokugawa Naritaka. Among tea utensils, he specialised in finely crafted incense holders and figurines. His style was influenced by the tastes at the Owari Tokugawa court at Nagoya Castle which produced Ofukei ware.

His son was Iori (伊織; 1827–1879), who also made items with his father together.
