= Issey =

Issey is a given name. Notable people with the name include:

- Issey Cross, English musician
- Issey Maholo (born 1985), former Japanese professional footballer
- Issey Miyake (1938–2022), Japanese fashion designer
- Issey Nakajima-Farran (born 1984), Canadian professional soccer player
- Issey Ogata (born 1952), Japanese actor and comedian
- Issey Takahashi, Japanese actor and singer

== See also ==
- St Issey (Cornish: Egloskrug) is a civil parish and village in Cornwall, England
- St Issey and St Tudy (electoral division), electoral division of Cornwall, England
- Issei (given name)
