= Hajime Katō =

Hajime Katō may refer to:

- Hajime Katō (painter) (1925–2000), Japanese painter who emigrated to France, where he died
- Hajime Katō (potter) (1900–1968), Japanese potter
