= Heihachirō Fukuda =

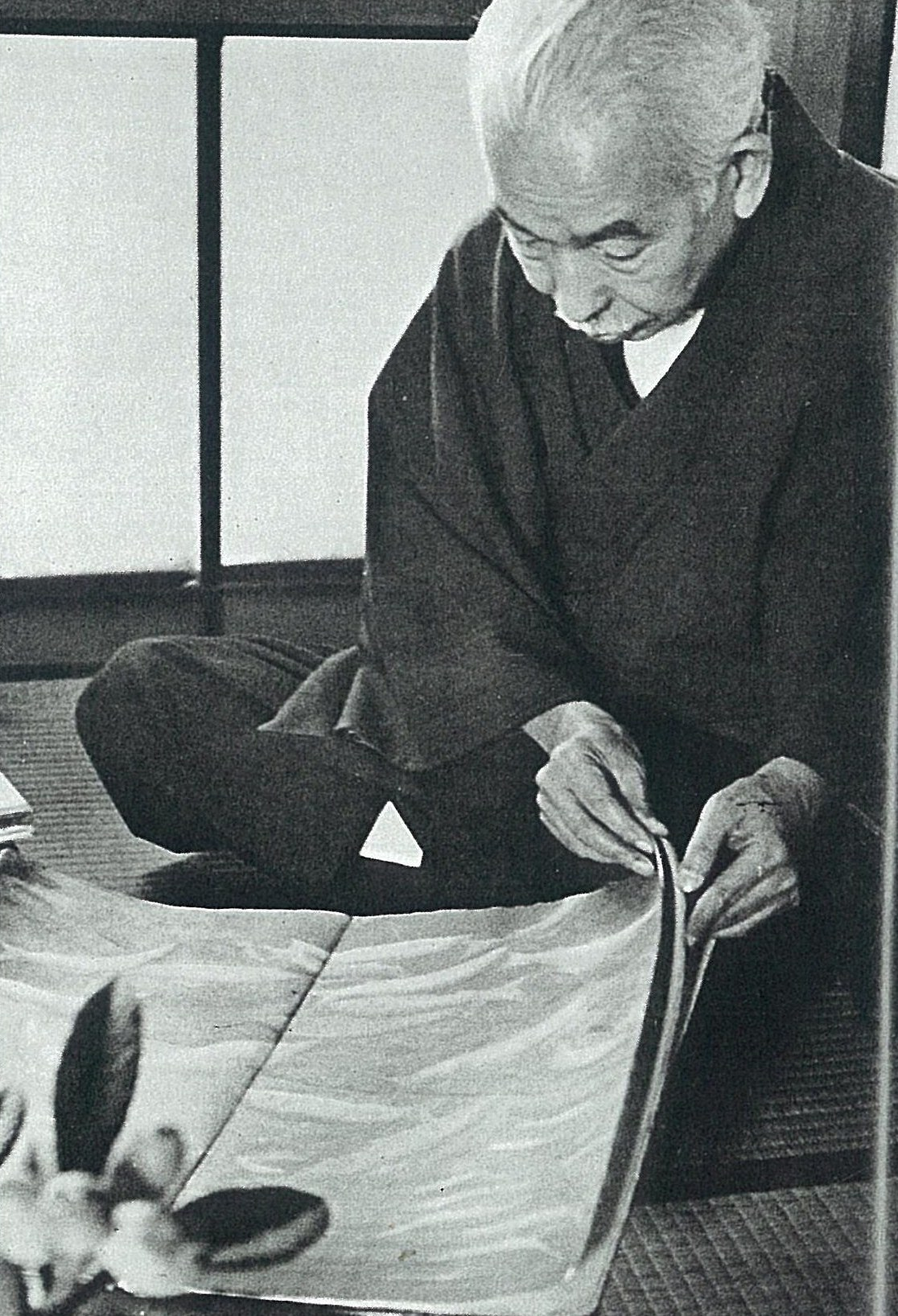
Heihachirō Fukuda (1961)

Heihachirō Fukuda (福田平八郎, Fukuda Heihachirō; February 28, 1892 – March 22, 1974) was a Japanese Nihonga painter and designer.

He received a commission to decorate the Take-no-ma audience room of the Tokyo Imperial Palace, a hall that has an area of 182 square meters, or 55 tsubo. The piece “Take” depicts bamboo. The hall also features works by Tatsuaki Kuroda and Hajime Kato.

His work is a part of the collection of the Menard Art Museum, the Osaka City Museum of Modern Art, and the National Museum of Modern Art, Kyoto.

== See also ==
- Seison Maeda (1885–1977), one of the leading Nihonga painters
- List of Nihonga painters
