= Seto ware =

Type of Japanese pottery

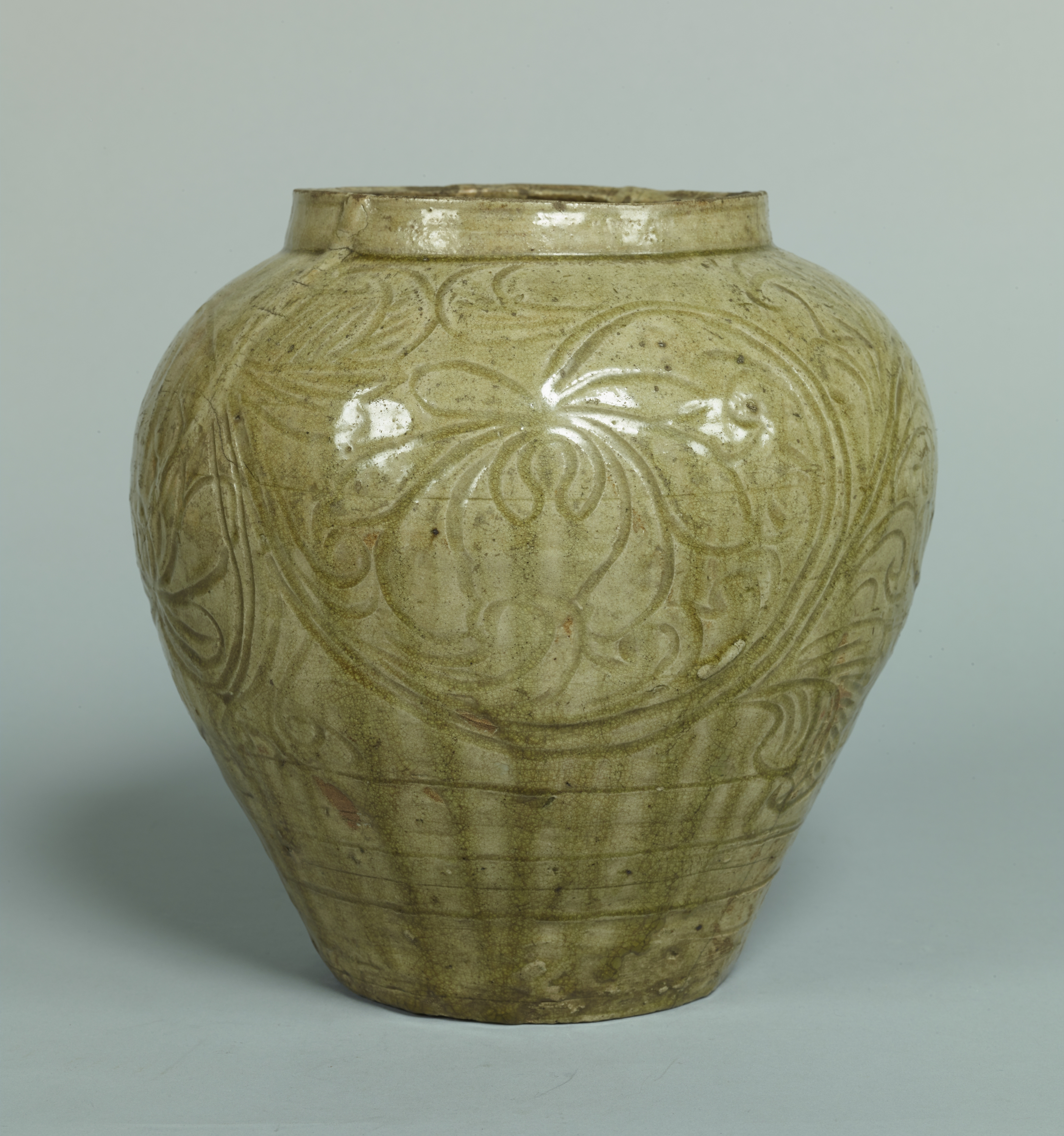
Wide-Mouthed Storage Jar with Peony Vines. Kamakura period, 14th century. Important Cultural Property of Japan. Tokyo National Museum

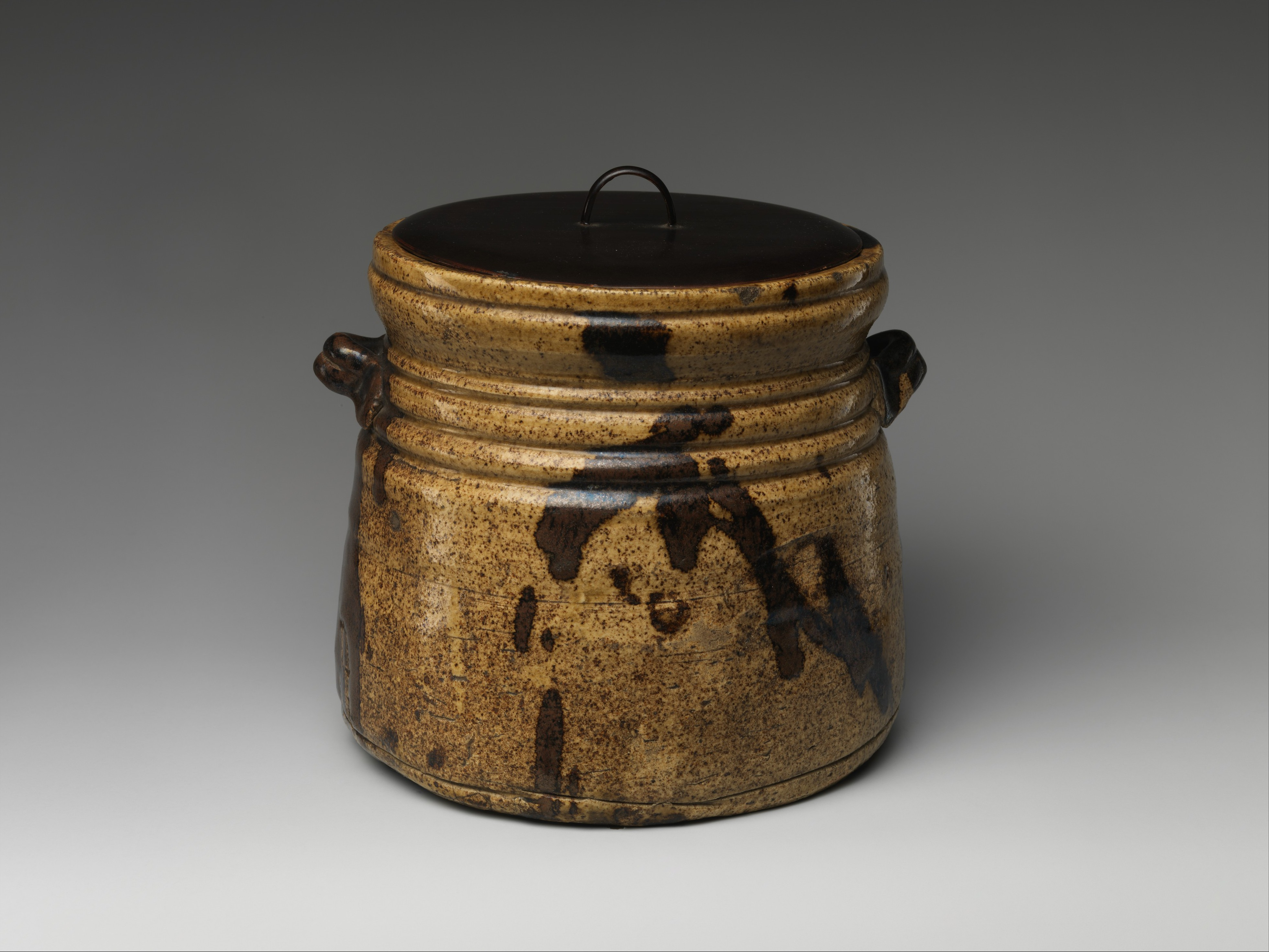
Kiseto water jar, clay covered with glaze and iron-brown splashes and black lacquer cover, Momoyama or Edo period, 17th century

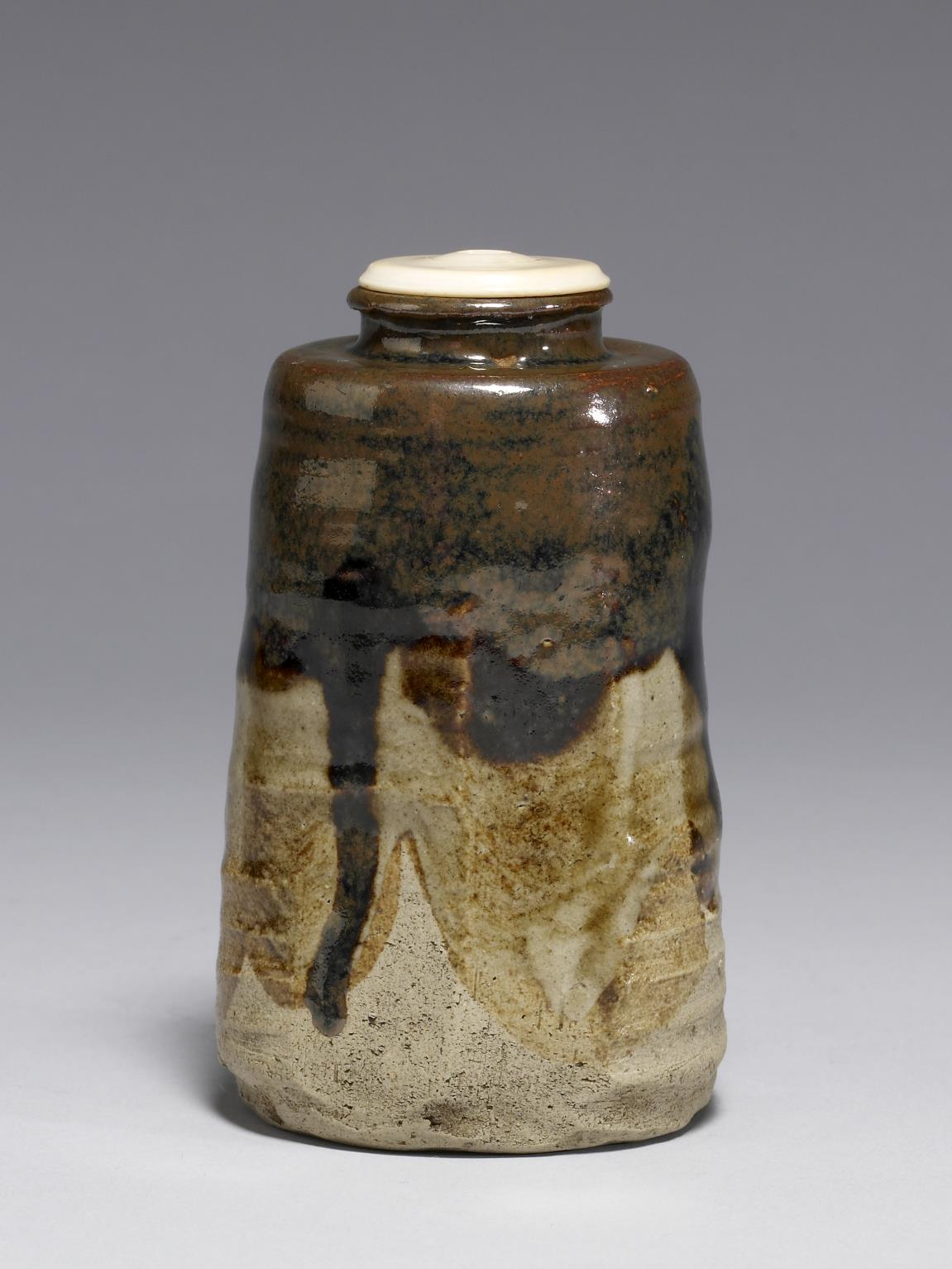
Stoneware tea caddy with wood-ash and iron glazes, Edo period, early 19th century

Seto ware (瀬戸焼, Seto-yaki) is a type of Japanese pottery, stoneware, and ceramics produced in and around the city of Seto in Aichi Prefecture, Japan. The Japanese term for it, setomono, is also used as a generic term for all pottery. Seto was the location of one of the Six Ancient Kilns of Japan.

== History ==
Pottery made in Seto dates back to the 13th century. Katō Shirōzaemon is credited as the first to produce wares in the town. In the 1220s he studied the art of pottery in China. After several failed attempts in various locations, Shirōzaemon founded a successful kiln at Seto. Other potters followed thereafter and Seto became a renowned center for ceramic production.

Potters drew inspiration from Chinese ceramics, including green celadon porcelains and dark brown tenmoku wares. The earliest Seto ceramics may have evolved from failed attempts to reproduce Chinese celadons. During the Kamakura period, wares produced in Seto imitated the pottery of the Song dynasty in China. Later, in the Muromachi period (1337–1573), Seto glazes were refined and the styles developed there spread to other areas in Japan such as modern Gifu Prefecture.

Later Seto works were given a brown iron glaze and fired at high temperatures to create glossy surfaces.

During the Kan'ei era (1624–44), the first daimyō of Owari Domain Tokugawa Yoshinao (1601–1650) had a kiln constructed at the corner of the Ofuke enceinte (Ofukemaru) of Nagoya Castle and invited potters from Seto to make pottery there.

The Aichi Prefectural Ceramic Museum in Seto has a large and exemplary collection of Seto ware.

== Characteristics ==
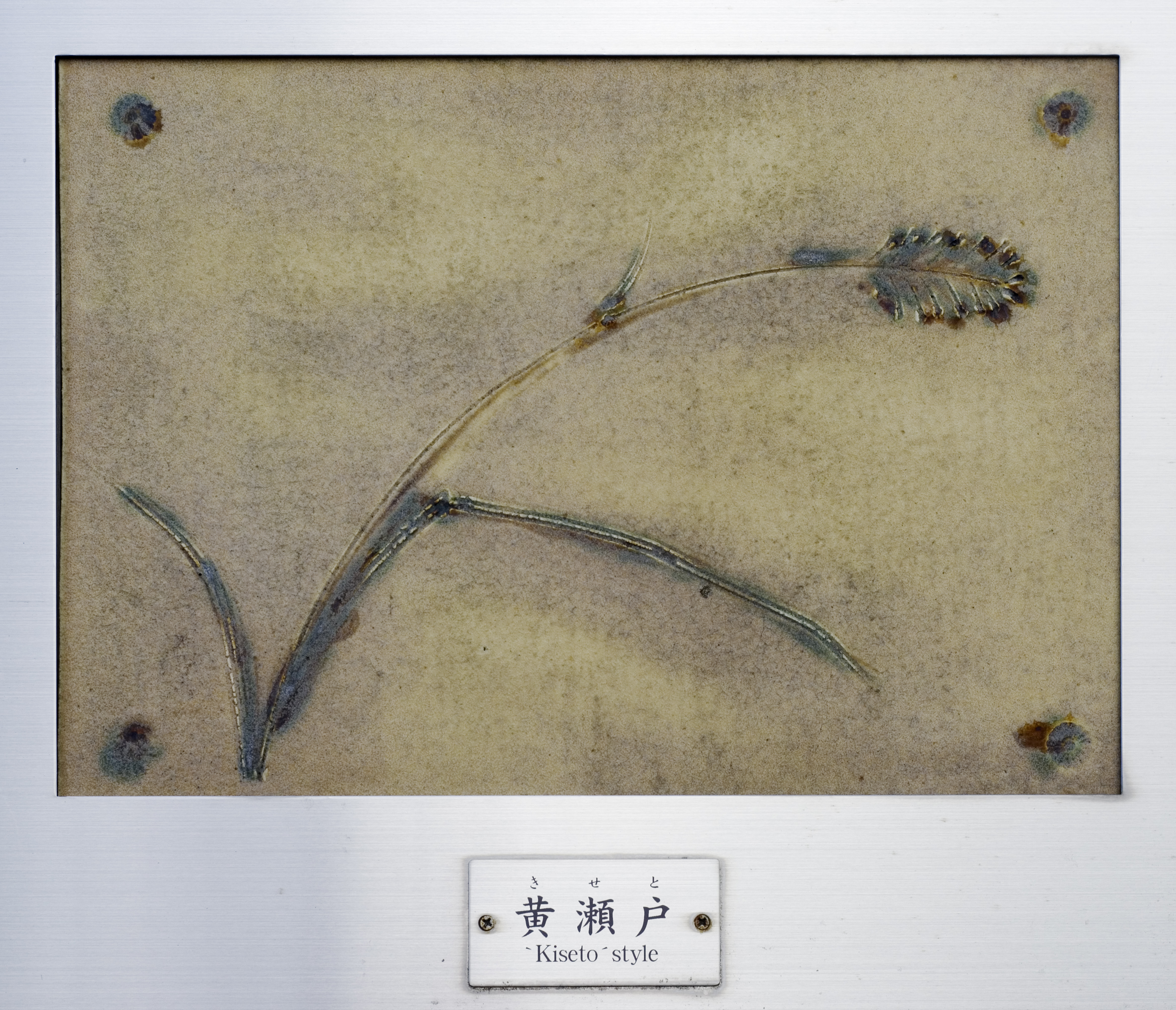
Example of Kiseto style glaze. Exhibited in Aichi Prefectural Ceramic Museum.

The most distinctive feature of Seto ware is its use of a wide variety of glazes, and during the Kamakura period, Seto was the location in Japan that made use of glazes. This glazed pottery, or Ko-Seto (古瀬戸) impacted the development of bowls used for the Japanese tea ceremony. The clay available in Seto is a high-quality kaolin and porcelain stone which turns white when fired and helps produce colored glazes.

The different types and glazes of Seto ware are:

- Kiseto (黄瀬戸), a yellow glaze
- Setoguro (瀬戸黒), a black glaze
- Shino ware (志野)
- Oribe ware (織部)
- Tetsuaka (鉄赤), an iron red glaze
- Haigusuri (灰釉), ash glaze

== See also ==
- Tokoname ware
