= Seiko Kato Behr =

Japanese-born American artist (1941–2010)

- 加藤 聖子
- Born: Seiko Kato; 1941; Osaka, Japan
- Died: November 15, 2010 (aged 68–69); Chestertown, Maryland, U.S.
- Other names: Seiko Behr, Seiko K. Behr
- Occupations: Ceramicist, potter, sculptor, installation artist, ikebana floral designer
- Known for: Ikebana vase potter
- Movement: Modernism
- Spouse: Robert D. Behr

Seiko Kato Behr (née Seiko Kato, Japanese: 加藤 聖子; 1941 – November 15, 2010) was a Japanese-born American potter, sculptor, and installation artist based in Maryland. She also was an Ikebana floral designer and second-degree master of the Ohara-ryū, and is known for her handmade, modernist Ikebana vases.

== Life and career ==
Seiko Kato was born in 1941, in Osaka, Japan, and raised in Tokyo. She studied in Tajimi, Japan, under master potter Teruo Hara (1929–1985), and master shino ware (shino-yaki) artist, Kozo Kato (1935–2023).

For 30 years she created Ikebana vessels and vases from clay. Her former pottery workspace was in Chestertown, Maryland.

She was also an Ikebana floral designer, and a second-degree master of the Ohara-ryū. She is known for her modernist Ikebana vessels and vases. In 1993, she received an award at the second Sogetsu International Container Competition in Tokyo.

In 2007, Behr's sculpture work, ceramics and installation art was shown at a solo exhibition at the Academy Art Museum in Easton, Maryland.

Behr died on November 15, 2010, in Chestertown, Maryland. Her daughter Robbi K. Behr is an artist and children's book illustrator.
