= Issei (given name) =

Issei or Issey is a masculine Japanese given name. Notable people with the name include:

- Issei Endō (遠藤 一星; born 1989), Japanese baseball player
- Issei Futamata (二又 一成; born 1955), Japanese actor, voice actor and narrator
- Issei Kato (加藤 壱盛; born May 28, 2003), Japanese association football player
- Issei Kitagawa (北川 一成; born 1942), Japanese politician
- Issei Koga (古賀 一成; born 1947), Japanese politician
- Issei Mamehara (豆原 一成; born 2002), Japanese singer and actor, member of JO1
- Issey Miyake (三宅 一生; 1938–2022), Japanese fashion designer
- Issei Miyazaki (宮崎 一成; born 1971), Japanese voice actor
- Issei Nishikawa (西川 一誠; born 1945), Japanese politician
- Issei Noro (野呂 一生; born 1957), Japanese jazz fusion guitarist
- Issey Ogata (イッセー尾形; born 1952), Japanese actor and comedian
- Issei Otake (大竹 壱青; born 1995), Japanese volleyball player
- Issei Sagawa (佐川 一政; 1949–2022), Japanese cannibal
- Issei Suda (須田 一政; 1940–2019), Japanese photographer
- Issei Taito (問田一誠; ; born 1999), Japanese YouTuber
- Issei Tajima (田島 一成; born 1940), Japanese politician
- Issei Takazaki (髙﨑 一生; born 1987), Japanese shogi player
- Issei Tanaka (田仲 一成; 1932/1933–2025), Japanese writer
- Issei Yamamoto (山本 一清; 1889–1959), Japanese astronomer

== Fictional character ==
- Issei Hyodo (兵藤一誠), a character from the light novel series High School DxD
- Issei Matsukawa (松川 一静), a character from the manga and anime Haikyu!! with the position of middle blocker from Aoba Johsai High
- Issei Miyata (宮田 一誠), a character from the novel and anime film I Want to Eat Your Pancreas
