= Hajime Katō (painter) =

Japanese painter, designer, and keirin cyclist

Hajime Katō (加藤一, Katō Hajime) (1925–2000) was a Japanese painter and designer.

He was born in Kanda, Tokyo. Before becoming a painter, he was a professional keirin cyclist.

In 1958 he emigrated to France. He died in Paris and was laid to rest in the Montparnasse Cemetery.

== See also ==
- Hajime Katō (potter)
