= Tatsuaki Kuroda =

Japanese artist (1904–1982)

Tatsuaki Kuroda (黒田 辰秋, Kuroda Tatsuaki; 1904–1982) was a Japanese woodworker and lacquerware artist. He was nominated a Living National Treasure in 1970.

Kuroda received a commission to create the doorknob bases for the Take-no-Ma audience room in the new Tokyo Imperial Palace. The bases are 52cm in diameter and decorated with “raden”, in which shell or pieces of precious metals are set. He used Japanese mother of pearl on the inner side and Mexican shells were set on the outside. The hall also features works by Heihachirō Fukuda and Hajime Katō.

== See also ==
- List of Nihonga painters
