= Nei Kato =

Nei Kato (加藤 寧, Katō Nei) is a computer engineer at Tohoku University in Sendai, Japan. He was named a Fellow of the Institute of Electrical and Electronics Engineers (IEEE) in 2013 for his contributions to satellite systems and network intrusion detection. Since that year, he is also a fellow of the Vehicular Technology Society. He is also an academician of the Engineering Academy of Japan.

== Education and career ==
Kato obtained M.D. and Ph.D. degrees in information engineering from Tohoku University in 1988 and 1991 respectively. From 1991 to 1996 he served as research associate at the Computer Center of the Tohoku University and then became associate professor at the Graduate School of Information Sciences. From 2003 to 2013, Kato was a professor at Tohoku University and after it became special assistant to the university's president. In 2015, Kato became a director of the Research Organization of Electrical Communication and in 2018 became deputy dean of the Graduate School of Information Sciences. From 2010 to 2012, he served as the chair of Satellite and Space Communications Technical Committee and from 2014 to 2015 held the same position with the Ad Hoc & Sensor Networks Technical Committee of the IEEE Communications Society. He also served as the editor-in-chief of IEEE Network Magazine from 2015 to 2017 and was a Member-at-Large on the board of governors of the IEEE Communications Society from 2014 to 2016. Following it, he spent one year as a vice chair on the Fellow Committee of the IEEE Computer Society and until 2017 was a member of IEEE Communications Society Award Committee. Since 2017, Kato serves as chair of the IEEE Communications Society Sendai Chapter and editor-in-chief of IEEE Transactions on Vehicular Technology. Between 2018 and 2021, Kato will serve as vice-president of the IEEE Communications Society.

On November 16, 2019, Kato visited Chongqing University of Posts and Telecommunications, where he read academic report entitled "Deep Learning in Network Traffic Control--How Far We Have Come and Future Challenges".
