= Katō Enao =

Katō Enao (加藤 枝直, 1693–1785) was a Japanese waka poet of the mid-Edo period. His real surname was Tachibana (橘), and his original given name was Tamenao (為直); he later changed it to Enao, which he also wrote as 要南甫. His nickname was Matazaemon (又左衛門), and he used various art names including Nanzan (南山), Tokoyoan (常世庵) and Hagizono (芳宜園).

== Biography ==
He was born on the eleventh day of the twelfth month of Genroku 5 (1692) according to the traditional Japanese calendar, and died on the tenth day of the eighth month of Tenmei 5 (1785). His grave is in Ekō-in. He was the father of the waka poet and kokugaku scholar Katō Chikage.

He was born in Matsusaka, Ise Province. According to tradition, he was a distant relative of Tachibana no Moroe and a descendant of Nōin, and that their descendants had become retainers of the Kitabatake clan in Ise. His father Naoyuki (尚之) had served the Kishū Tokugawawa, but became a rōnin and settled in Matsusaka before taking up waka composition. Enao, too, started composing waka at age seven or eight.

In 1718 Enao went to Edo and entered the service of the Tokugawa shogunate, and in 1720 became a yoriki under Ōoka Tadasuke. The following year he became a ginmikata, a position he held until 1731. He left his position for a time before entering the service of the governor of Shimotsuke Province (稲生下野守).

He retired in 1763, and the following year he shaved his head. From that point he enjoyed a life of leisure, devoting himself to waka and the study of the classics. He kept a diary from 1766 to 1780, which is an important source for the details of his post-retirement life.

== Names ==
His real surname was Tachibana (橘), and his original given name was Tamenao (為直); he later changed it to Enao, which he also wrote as "要南甫". His nickname was Matazaemon (又左衛門), and he used various art names including Nanzan (南山), Tokoyoan (常世庵) and Hagizono (芳宜園).

== Writings ==
While in the service of Ōoka Tadasuke, he helped draft the second volume of the Kujikata Osadamegaki, known as the Osadamegaki Hyakkajō (御定書百箇条). After retiring, he collaborated with Kanze Motoakira to create the Meiwa Kaisei-bon Yōkyoku (明和改正本謡曲), a revised yōkyoku text. This work was traditionally credited to Kamo no Mabuchi, who was acting under the direction of Tayasu Munetake, but supposedly Enao was the main editor, and worked under the tutelage of Motoakira.

Enao was a waka prodigy from a young age, and when he arrived in Edo he is said to have studied under the Dōjō school (堂上派) poet Oshiko Yoshinari (鴛氷由也). He maintained his love of waka for his whole life, and composed several karonsho (books of waka poetic theory), including Uta no Sugata Inishie e Ima o Agetsurau (歌の姿古へ今を論らふ詞), Uta no Oshie (歌のおしへ), Ko ni Atauru Fumi (子に与ふる文) and Kōshun Jō no Sho (答俊仍書). He also left a personal anthology, Azuma-uta (東歌), which in print appeared in six books divided into three volumes, as well as a handwritten manuscript of the same.

He provided patronage to Kamo no Mabuchi, and the two influenced each other's poetry and research of the classics. Enao viewed the Kokin Wakashū as the pinnacle of waka, although his works also show the influence of Man'yō-chō (万葉調, Man'yōshū style) and Shin-Kokin-chō (新古今調, Shin-Kokin Wakashū style).

== Works cited ==
- Inoue, Minoru (1983a). "Ko ni Atauru Fumi". Nihon Koten Bungaku Daijiten 日本古典文学大辞典 (in Japanese). Vol. 1. Tokyo: Iwanami Shoten. p. 661. OCLC 11917421.
- Inoue, Minoru (1983b). "Azuma-uta". Nihon Koten Bungaku Daijiten (in Japanese). Vol. 1. Tokyo: Iwanami Shoten. pp. 57–58. OCLC 11917421.
- Inoue, Minoru (1983c). "Ko ni Atauru Fumi". Nihon Koten Bungaku Daijiten (in Japanese). Vol. 2. Tokyo: Iwanami Shoten. p. 650. OCLC 11917421.
