= Shuichi Kato =

Shuichi Kato may refer to:

- Shuichi Kato (politician), Japanese politician
- Shūichi Katō (critic), Japanese critic and author
