= Kiyomi Kato =

Kiyomi Kato may refer to

- Kiyomi Kato (volleyball) (born 1953), Japanese volleyball player
- Kiyomi Kato (wrestler) (born 1948), Japanese wrestler
