= Masayoshi Kato =

Japanese baseball player (born 1987)

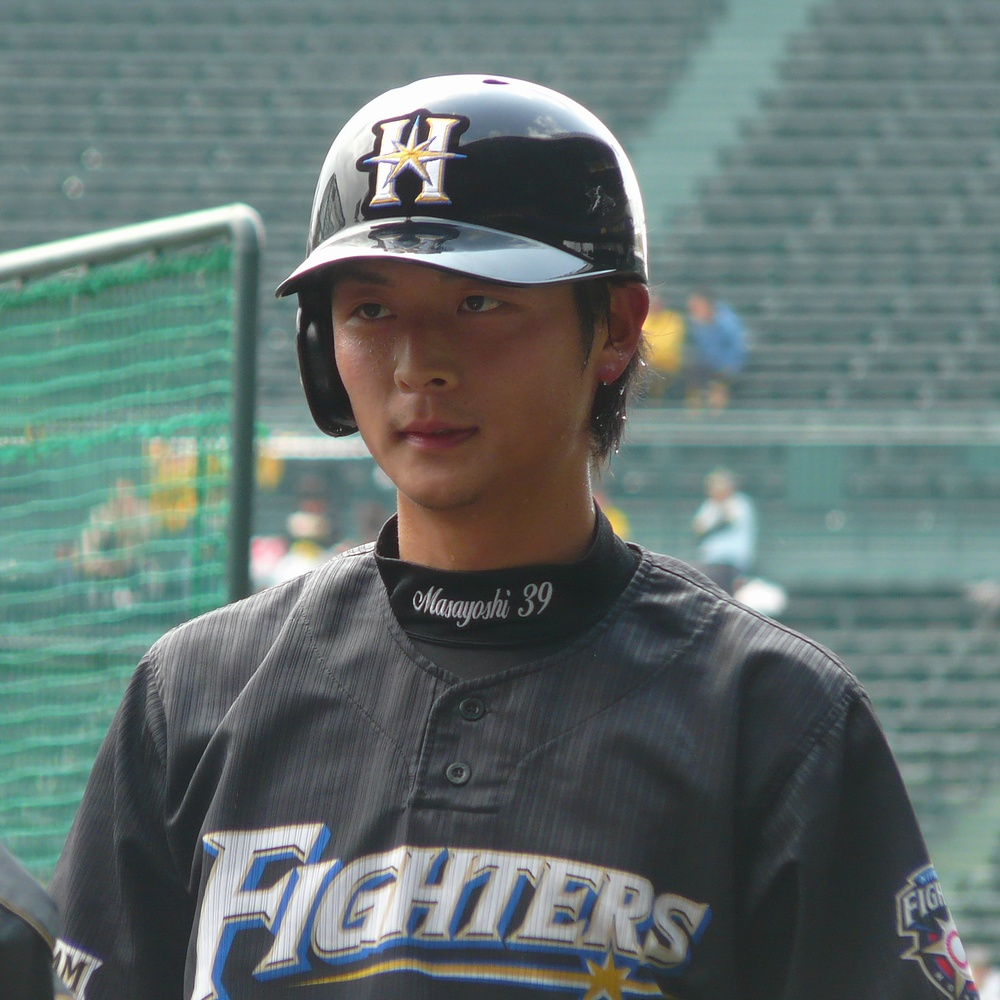
- Kato with the Hokkaido Nippon-Ham Fighters
- Infielder
- Born: April 28, 1987 (age 38); Sendai, Miyagi
- Bats: Left Throws: Right

debut
- 2010, for the Hokkaido Nippon-Ham Fighters

Career statistics (through 2015 season)
- Batting average: .193
- Home runs: 1
- Runs batted in: 5
- Stats at Baseball Reference

Teams
- Hokkaido Nippon-Ham Fighters (2010–2013); Yokohama DeNA BayStars (2014–2015)

Masayoshi Kato (加藤 政義, Katō Masayoshi) is a Japanese professional baseball infielder. He was born on April 28, 1987, in Sendai. Miyagi. He is currently playing for Yokohama DeNA BayStars of the NPB.
