= Katō Tadaaki =

Katō Tadaaki (加藤 忠明, ? - ?) was a retainer beneath the clan of Toyotomi throughout the latter Sengoku Period of Feudal Japan. He was the younger brother of Katō Yoshiaki, one of the Seven Spears of Shizugatake, and helped protect his brother's castle when he left to fight at Sekigahara.
