= Takeshi Katō =

Takeshi Katō may refer to:

- Takeshi Kato, father of Japanese-Indonesian actress Yuki Kato
- Takeshi Katō (actor) (加藤武), Japanese actor
- Takeshi Katō (gymnast) (加藤武司), Japanese gymnast
