= Miyu Kato =

Miyu Kato may refer to:

- Miyu Kato (tennis) (加藤 未唯, born 1994), Japanese tennis player
- Miyu Kato (table tennis) (加藤 美優, born 1999), Japanese table tennis player
