= Koichi Kato =

Kōichi Katō is the name of two House of Representatives of Japan's members:

- Koichi Kato (LDP) (加藤紘一, 1939–2016), Japanese politician
- Koichi Kato (DPJ) (加藤公一, born 1964), Japanese politician
