= Takako Katō =

Takako Katō may refer to:

- Takako Katō (actress) (born 1970), Japanese actress and singer
- Takako Katō (basketball) (born 1971), Japanese basketball player
