= Kyohei Iwasaki =

Japanese baseball player (born 1986)

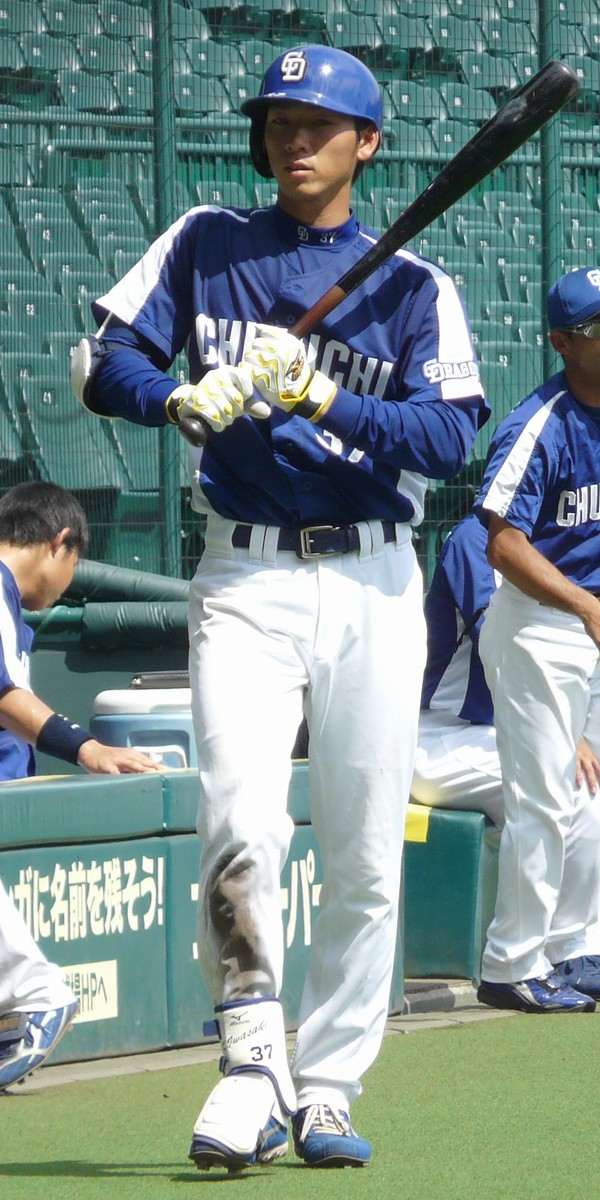
- Iwasaki with the Chunichi Dragons
- Second baseman
- Born: April 4, 1986 (age 40)
- Bats: Right Throws: Right

NPB debut
- 2009, for the Chunichi Dragons

NPB statistics (through 2016)
- Batting average: .239
- Home runs: 5
- RBI: 10
- Stats at Baseball Reference

Teams
- Chunichi Dragons (2009–2014); Orix Buffaloes (2014–2017)

Kyohei Iwasaki (岩崎 恭平, born April 4, 1986) is a Japanese professional baseball second baseman. Iwasaki played for Chunichi Dragons in Japan's Nippon Professional Baseball in 2009, 2010, and 2013.
