= Issei Kato =

Japanese footballer

Personal information
- Date of birth: 28 May 2003 (age 23)
- Place of birth: Saitama, Japan
- Height: 1.80 m (5 ft 11 in)
- Position: Forward

Team information
- Current team: Vegalta Sendai
- Number: 43

Youth career
- Urawa Mimuro SSC
- Grande FC
- –2021: Vegalta Sendai

Senior career*
Years	Team	Apps	(Gls)
2021–	Vegalta Sendai	0	(0)
- * Club domestic league appearances and goals as of 17:04, 14 July 2021 (UTC)

Issei Kato (加藤 壱盛, Kato Issei; born 28 May 2003) is a Japanese footballer currently playing as a forward for Vegalta Sendai.

== Career statistics ==
=== Club ===
As of 14 July 2021.

Club	Season	League			National Cup		League Cup		Other		Total	
Club	Season	Division	Apps	Goals	Apps	Goals	Apps	Goals	Apps	Goals	Apps	Goals
Vegalta Sendai	2021	J1 League	0	0	0	0	1 (Note: Appearances in the J.League Cup)	0	0	0	1	0
Career total			0	0	0	0	1	0	0	0	1	0
