= Shino ware =

Type of Japanese pottery

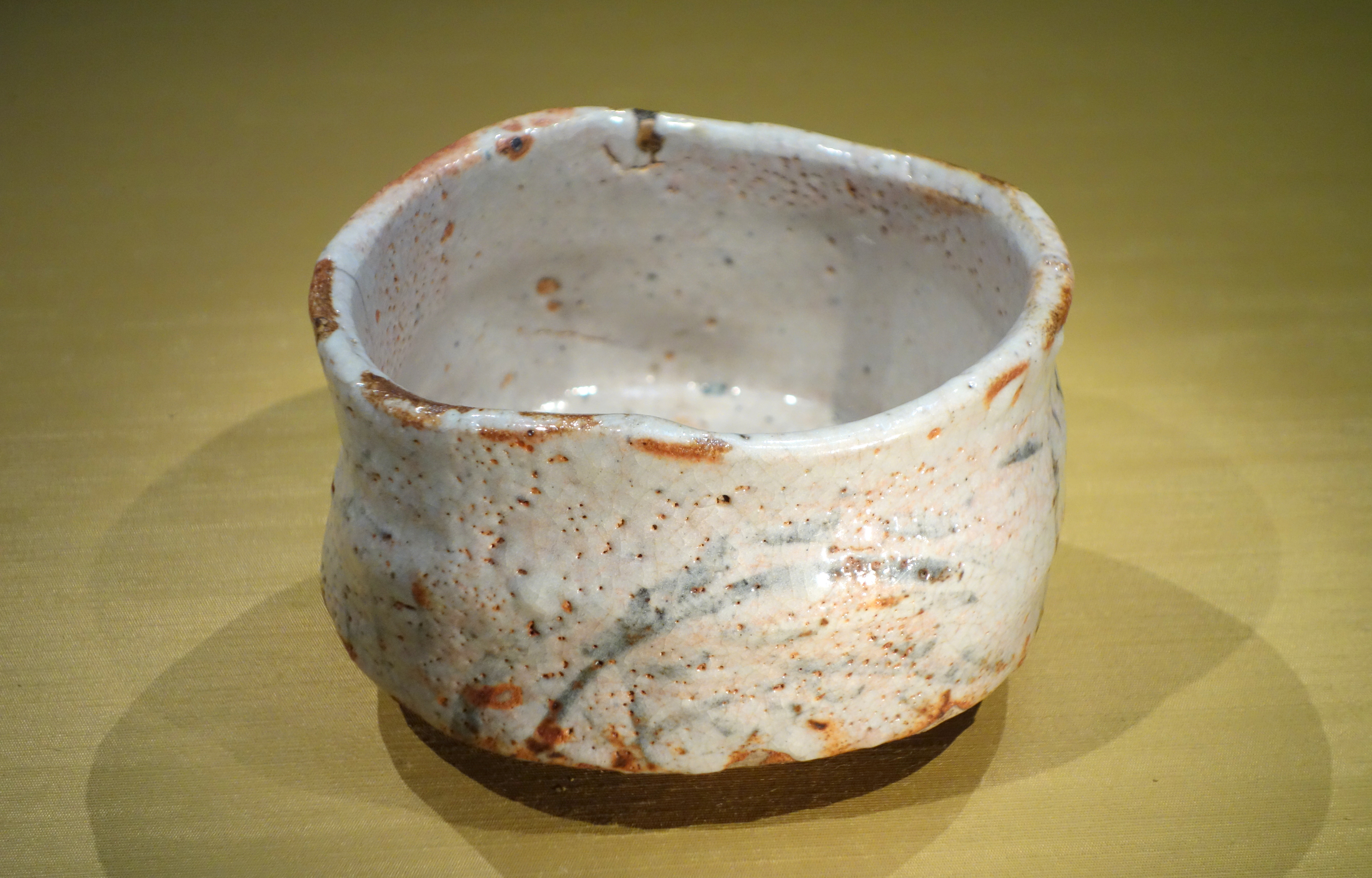
Shino ware tea bowl furisode, Azuchi-Momoyama to Edo period, 16th–17th century

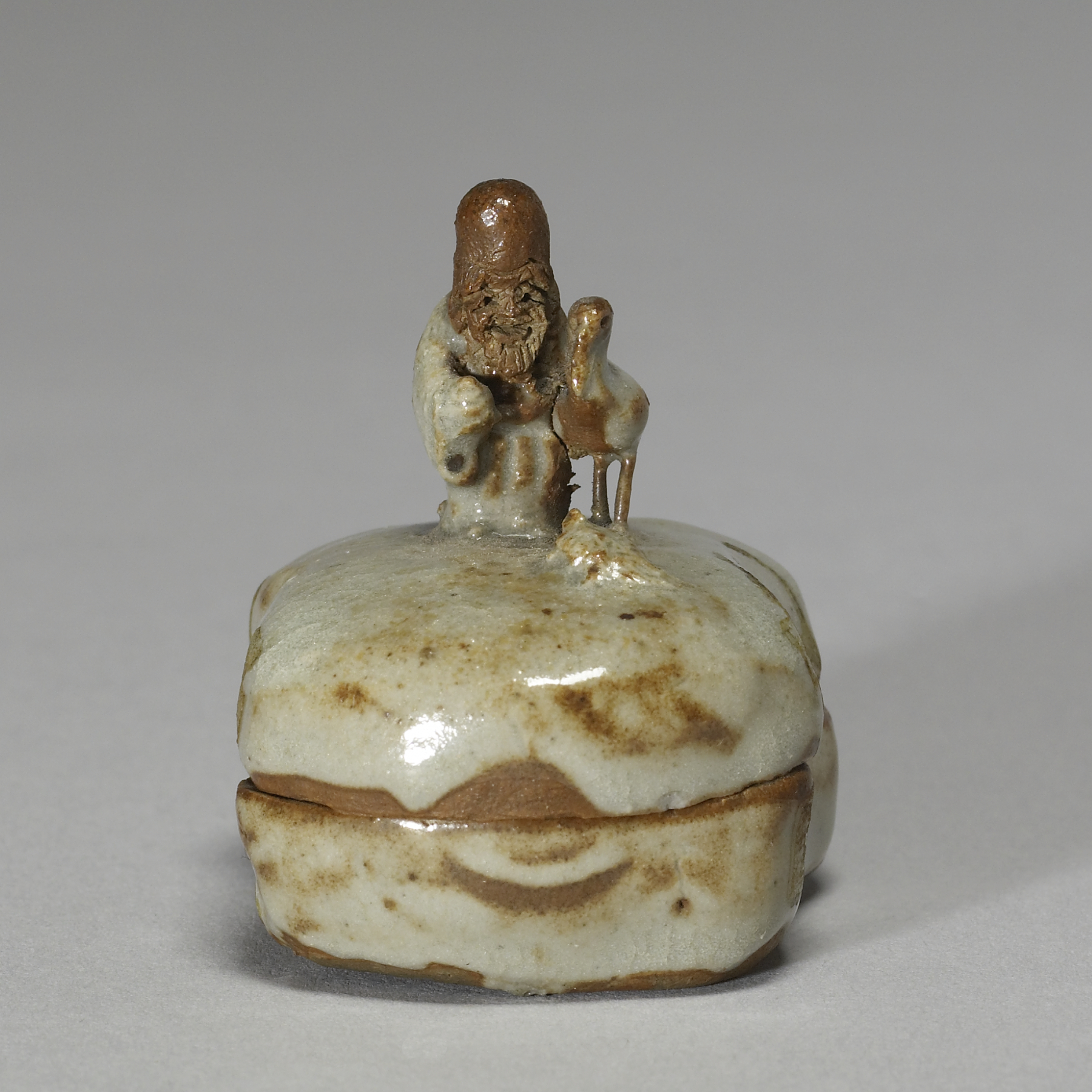
Shino incense container (kogo) with sculpted figures of Jurojin with a crane and a tortoise in feldspar glaze by Masaki Sōzaburō, late Edo period, early 19th century

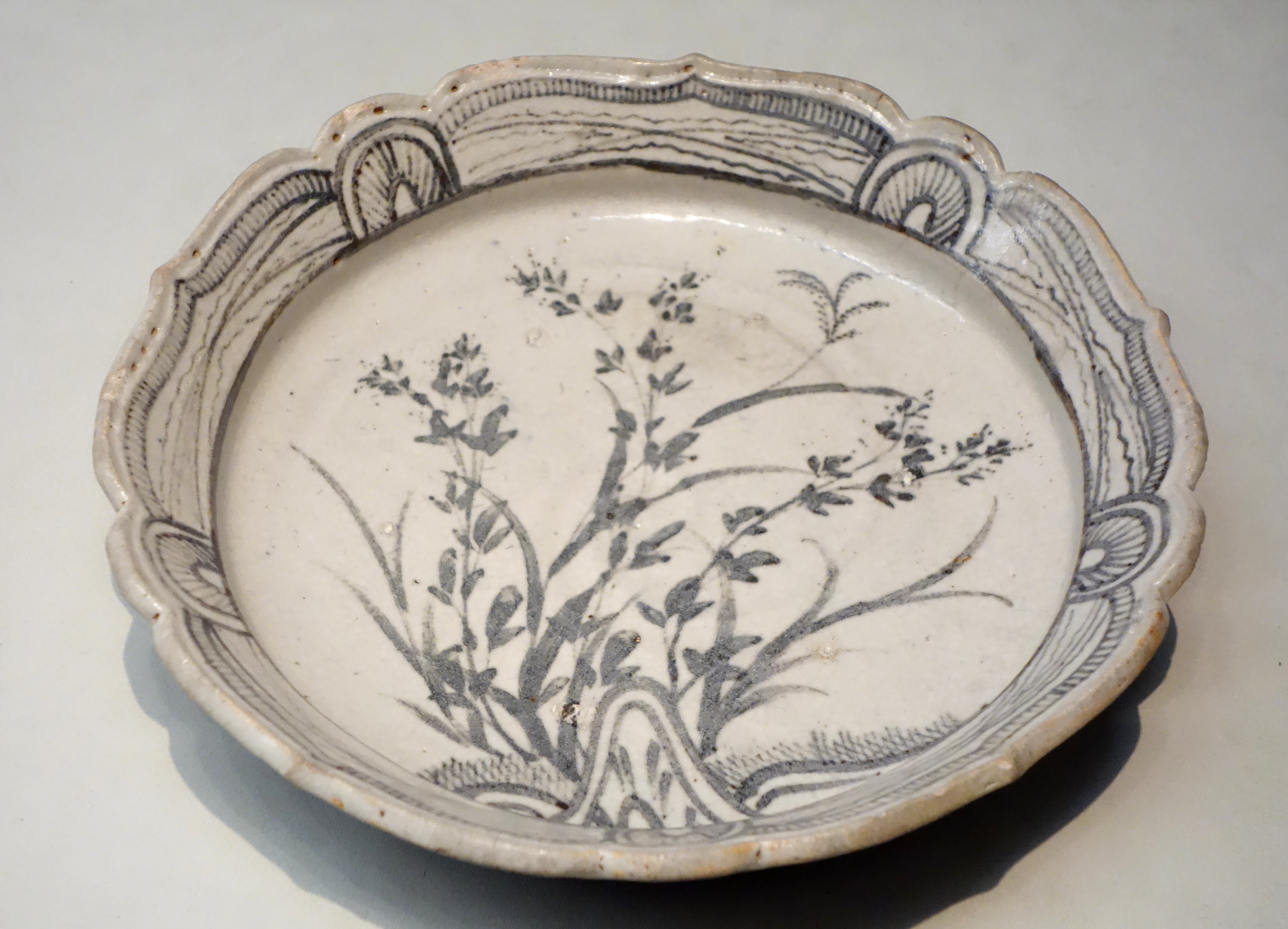
Shino ware shallow bowl, Azuchi-Momoyama to Edo period, 16th–17th century

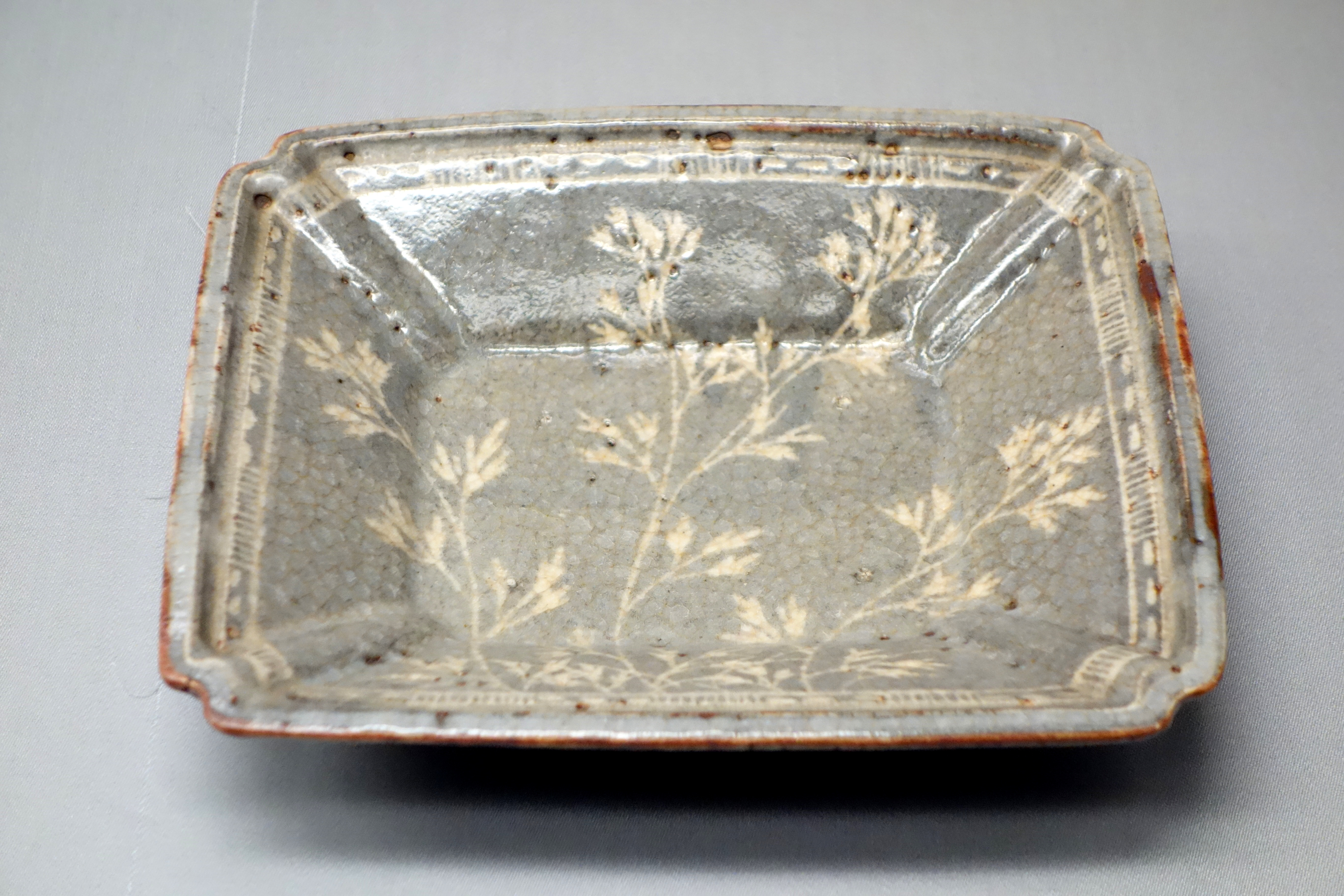
Nezumi-Shino ware, square dish with autumn grasses design, Azuchi-Momoyama to Edo period, 16th–17th century

Shino ware (志野焼, Shino-yaki) is Japanese pottery, usually stoneware, originally from Mino Province, in present-day Gifu Prefecture, Japan. It emerged in the 16th century, but the use of shino glaze is now widespread, both in Japan and abroad. It is identified by thick white glazes, red scorch marks, and a texture of small holes. Some experts believe it should not be treated as distinct from Oribe ware but described as "white Oribe", with the pottery usually called just Oribe described as "green Oribe" instead.

== History ==
The origin of the term "Shino" is uncertain. It may be derived from "Shiro", the Japanese word for "white", or it may refer to the tea master Shino Soshin (1444–1523). Kuroda and Murayama refer to a text by Kanamori Tokusiu (1857) which states:

"Shino Soshin had a favorite white-glazed, 'shoe-shaped bowl, imported from South Asia, which he used as a tea bowl."

The first Shino ware was developed during the Momoyama period (1568–1600), in kilns in the Mino and Seto areas. The glaze, composed primarily of ground local feldspar and a small amount of local clay, produced a satiny white color. It was the first white glaze used in Japanese ceramics. Wares decorated with Shino were fired in the Anagama kilns used at that time. Anagama kilns were single-chambered kilns made from a trench in a hillside that was covered with an earthen roof. As the anagama kilns were replaced by the multi-chambered noborigama kilns during the first decade of the 17th century, Shino was supplanted by the Oribe ware glazes used in the newer kilns. Shino enjoyed a brief revival in the 19th century, but then faded into obscurity.

In the 1930s and 1940s, two Japanese potters, Toyozo Arakawa and Hajime Katō, developed the first modern Shino glaze by studying Momoyama Shino pots. Working independently, in 1974, Virginia Wirt, a student of Warren MacKenzie at the University of Minnesota, developed a glaze formula that also sought to imitate the historical exemplars. Her glaze, which added soda ash and spodumene to the base of feldspar and clays, was the first American Shino.

Shino has since become one of the more popular glazes in American pottery studios. Many variations have spawned from Wirt’s original formula. Although many different colorants and fluxes can be added, creating a wide range of effects, Shino glazes in America are all characterized by the use of soda ash and by a high ratio of alumina to silica. Under certain firing conditions, the soda ash causes carbon to be trapped in the glaze, creating the characteristic grey spots or patches on the glaze surface.

== Characteristics ==
Like other Mino wares, the Shino style is based on older Seto ware with changes to shape, decoration, and finish. Forms are usually squat and cylindrical, thick but lightweight. Dishes, bowls, and tea utensils are most common. Pieces can be grey, red, or white, painted with iron oxide or decorated with glaze.

Shino glaze (志野釉, Shino uwagusuri) is a generic term for a family of pottery glazes. They tend to range in color from milky white to orange, sometimes with charcoal grey spotting, known as "carbon trap" which is the trapping of carbon in the glaze during the firing process. The term also refers to Japanese pottery made with the Shino glaze (see Shino-yaki).

Firings of Shino tend to be of lower temperature for a longer period of time, and then a slow cooling process. Due to Shino glazes' low fluxing temperatures, they should be applied before any other glazes. These conditions do not allow the glaze to melt fully, and the result is a thick glaze that often has a crawling pattern. If Shinos are applied on top of most glazes, the off-gassing from the underglaze will bubble through the Shino, resulting in undesirable pitting and other defects.

There is also a class of Shino glazes, called "Crawling" Shino, which are intentionally formulated to exhibit a glaze defect known as crawling. These Shinos form small, regular spots of bare clay all over the surface of the pot, some going so far as to cause the glaze to bead up on the surface of the clay.
