= Oribe ware =

Type of Japanese pottery

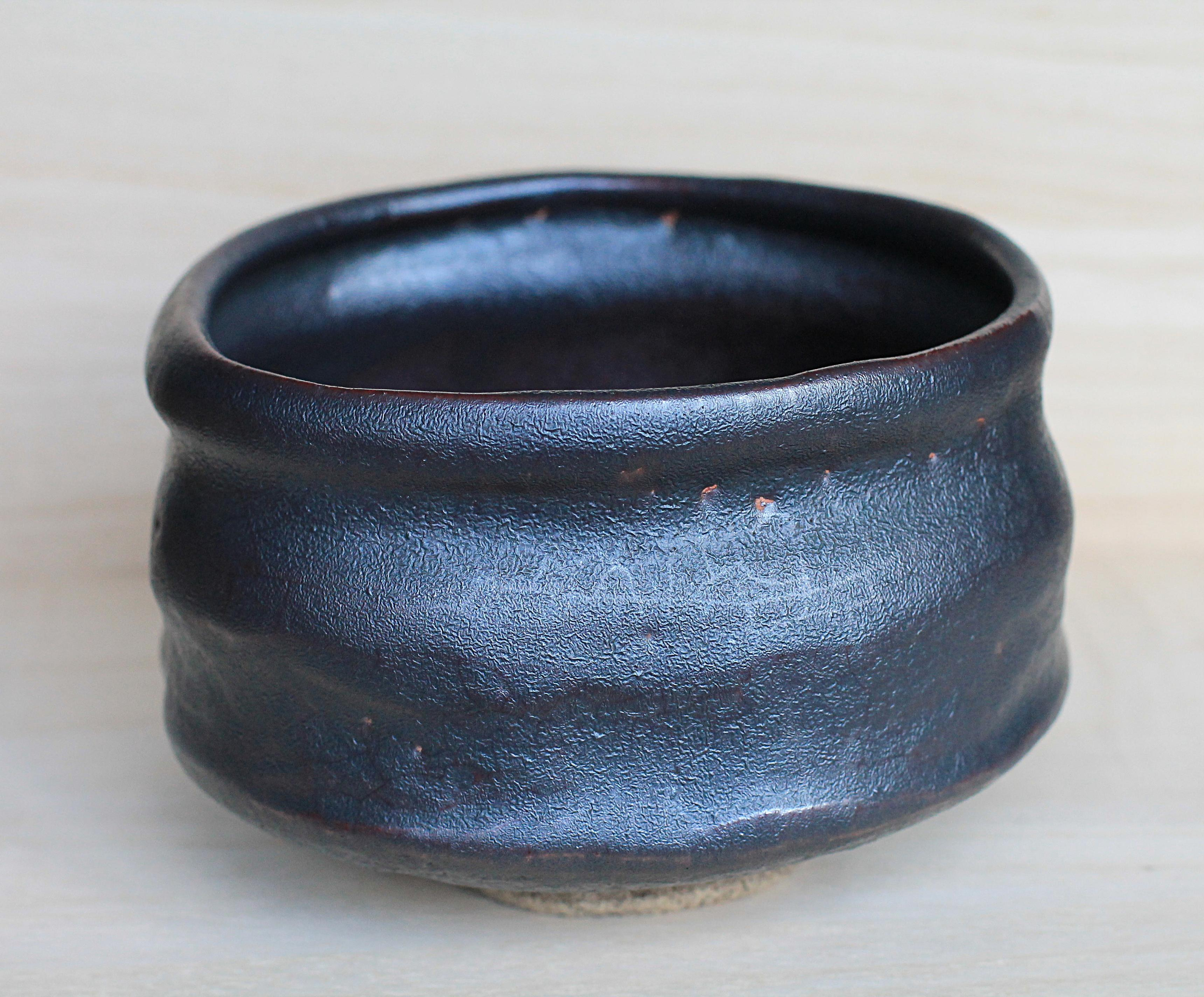
Oribe Black (Oribe-guro), early Edo period, c. 1620

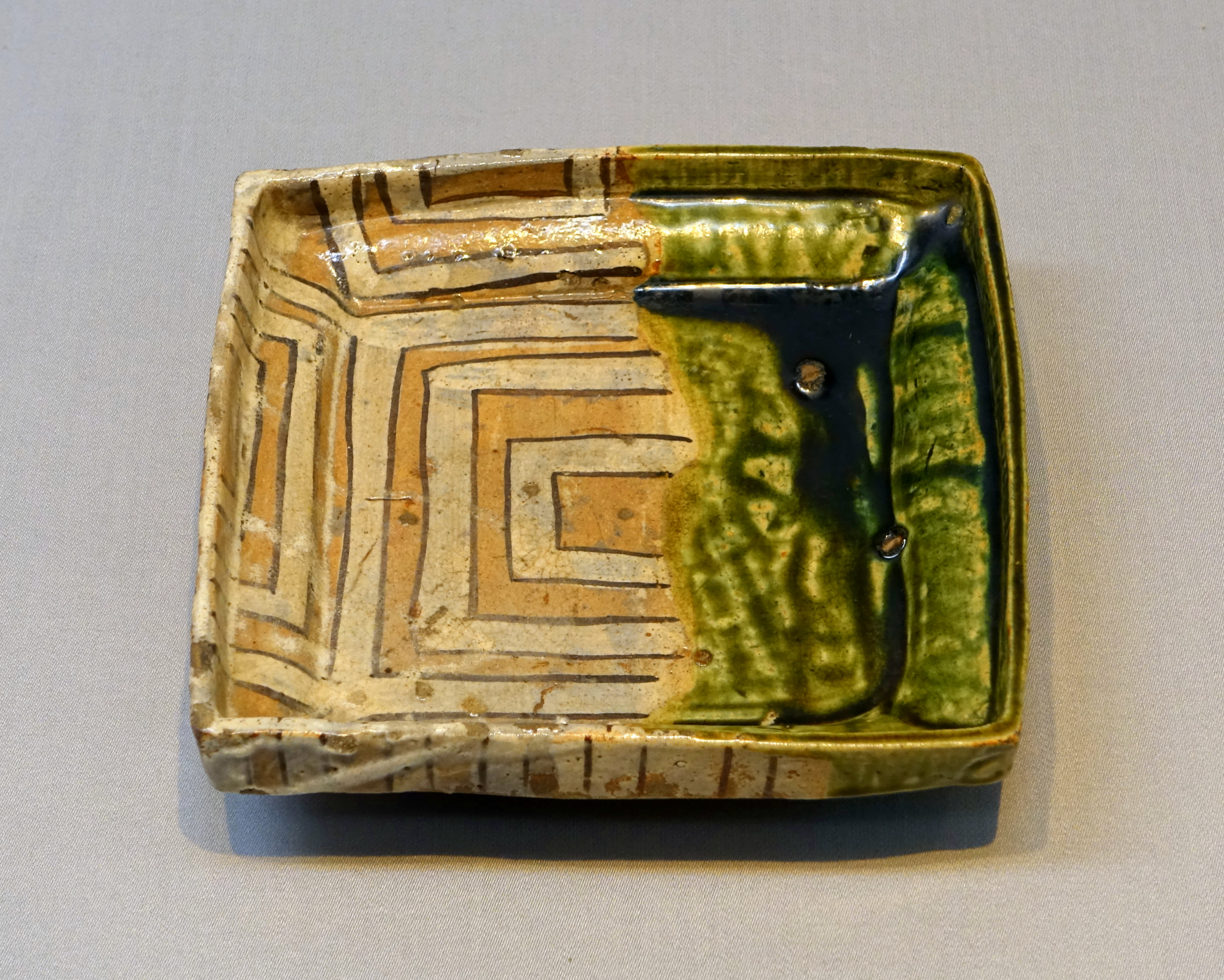
Cornered bowl, Mino ware, Oribe type, early Edo period, 1600s

Oribe ware, also known as 織部焼 (Oribe-yaki), is a style of Japanese pottery that first appeared in the sixteenth century. It is a type of Japanese stoneware recognized by its freely-applied glaze as well as its dramatic visual departure from the more somber, monochrome shapes and vessels common in Raku ware of the time. The ceramics were often asymmetric, with eccentric shapes; deformed shapes were not uncommon. These shapes were achieved through moulding rather than turning on a potter's wheel. Some bowls were so deformed that they were difficult to use – even whisking tea could become difficult.

== History ==
=== Origins ===
Throughout the late Momoyama (1573–1615) and early Edo periods (1615–1868) in Japan, the art of the Japanese tea ceremony underwent new developments. Great tea masters such as Takeno Jōō (1502–1555), Sen no Rikyū (1522–1591), and Furuta Oribe (1544–1615) revolutionized the utensils, rituals, and ceramics used in tea ceremonies. As time passed, technology improved, and kilns advanced; improved firing conditions allowed the creation of Oribe ware, a new kind of ceramic used in these tea ceremonies.

=== Scholarly disagreement ===
Scholars tend to disagree over great tea master Furuta Oribe's link to Oribe ware. Furuta Oribe was recognized as a disciple of Sen no Rikyū, another extremely important and influential tea master. Some researchers state plainly that Oribe was produced under Furuta Oribe's guidance. Others argue that Oribe ware may not have even been introduced during Furuta Oribe's lifetime, and therefore has been falsely attributed to him. Still others suggest that the connection between the two should be treated as a coincidence in history – that they happened to coexist at the same time, and this has influenced perceptions of Oribe ware today. The Museum of Furuta Oribe in Kyoto opened in 2014 and exhibits a number of Oribe wares.

There is also some disagreement over how to classify the many distinct types of Oribe ware, and where to draw the line in categorizing them. Some sources state that there are at least eight varieties of Oribe wares, but that they "need not be taken too seriously," granting some leniency in how to categorize them. Other sources list many more types and varieties.

=== Modern revival ===
Some of the most notable modern artists specializing in Oribe ware are Yasuo Tamaoki (b. 1941) and Osamu Suzuki (b. 1934; 鈴木藏), who was designated a Living National Treasure in 1994. Other notable Oribe ware artists are Suzuki Goro (b. 1941; 鈴木五郎), Higashida Shigemasa 東田茂正 (b. 1955), and Shigeru Koyama.

== Characteristics ==
The designs on most Oribe ware are richly colored, with blue, green, and copper glazes appearing most often. The deformed shapes of these ceramics are central to their aesthetic. Oftentimes, Oribe includes a lustrous hand-drawn iron-glaze designs in certain shapes or patterns. Common motifs within these patterns and drawings include scenes from nature, such as plants or ponds. Utensils of Oribe ware are incredibly varied: common types include bowls, plates, incense burners, dishes, tea caddies, vases, and countless other vessels used in traditional tea ceremonies. The revolutionary colors, shapes, and methods used in Oribe ceramics represent a noteworthy venture into modernity within the tea ceremony. According to some authors, the style was strikingly short-lived, yet managed to make a lasting impact on Japanese ceramics style and history.

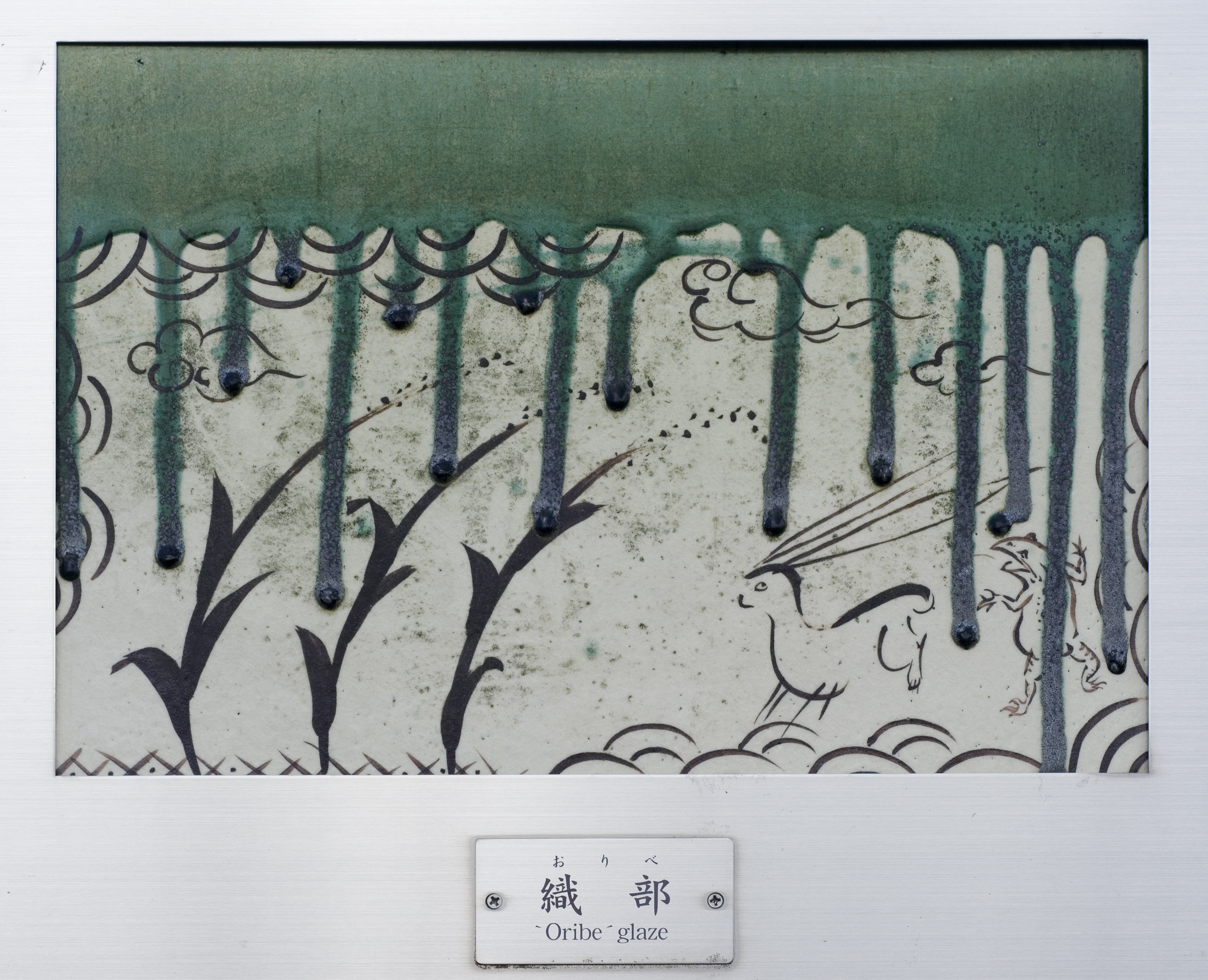
Example of Oribe style glaze. Exhibited in Aichi Prefectural Ceramic Museum.

Different types of glazes and patterns developed have included:

- Green Oribe (青織部, Ao-Oribe), a ceramic with classical green glaze and underglaze painting. Green is the typical colour of Oribe ware, along with white. The original Chinese green was a smooth, even colour like celadon. Oribe, however, tried to use different shades of more natural green, in order to reflect green mountains or riverside scenes. The surface is painted and decorated with lively surface designs, which may be based on nature, geometric patterns, or a combination of the two. For the brilliant green color, wares are fired using oxidation at 1220 degrees Celsius.
- Black Oribe (黒織部, Kuro-Oribe), black glazed ceramics with unglazed spots, sometimes decorated with paintings
- Shino-Oribe (志野織部) was originally the precursor to Shino ware, which, unlike old Shino ceramics, is fired in modern multi-chamber hangers

There is much variation in the type of ware as well as the surface treatment in Oribe pottery. Like many types of Japanese pottery, bowls and dishes are common. Oribe wares also include lidded jars and handled food containers. Many Japanese chefs still use Oribe green for their cuisine.

== Kilns ==
Numerous kiln sites, scattered throughout Mino, have been identified as areas where Oribe was produced. The creation of the multi-chambered climbing kiln, noborigama, allowed potters to come up with new and innovative ways of glazing. This kind of kiln was introduced from northern Kyushu by Korean potters in the late sixteenth century; the kiln allowed for an important change in traditional methods of firing and glazing. The very first kiln which produced Oribe is believed to have been the Motoyashiki kiln.

With the introduction of the new multi-chambered kilns, the less efficient, less dependable kilns which had been firing Shino wares slowly fell out of favor. The newer and larger kilns gave potters the potential to fire at much higher temperatures, which allowed reliable and even maturation of the glaze, resulting in that lustrous shine characteristic of Oribe. The new design also allowed for more effective firing in terms of space; more wares were required to fill a kiln, and this more potters must have been working in each area. The multi-faceted shapes unique to Oribe were created through molding the clay instead of by working on a potter’s wheel.

== Varieties ==
The all-encompassing umbrella term of “Mino pottery” includes Shino, Oribe, Yellow Seto, Seto Black, and Mino Iga wares. These five types are differentiated by the process of glaze development for each. Despite these identifying factors, many researchers claim that differentiating these types of ceramics is extremely difficult, and often based solely on aesthetic criteria. There is much variation in the type of ware as well as the surface treatment in Oribe pottery. There are so many forms of Oribe that it is incredibly difficult to identify them all, especially when sources vary in their categorization of Oribe; however, the most popular forms which appear across a majority of sources are Green, Monochrome, Narumi, Red, Black, Shino, and Oribe Black.

=== Green Oribe (青織部, Ao-Oribe) ===
Green Oribe is traditionally recognized by its distinctive green copper glaze, as well as the purposefully asymmetrical shapes. This kind of Oribe came from the Yashichida kiln in the Okaya group. Many consider this to be the most popular form of Oribe ware; it is highly recognizable from its fresh colored green glaze and contrasting white backgrounds. The glaze is not applied with a brush but with a pouring or ladling technique, resulting in a freely-applied look and feel. The distinct green color is a result of the copper-sulfate glaze, combined with oxidation firing. Common motifs include scenes from nature, such as flowers, rivers, and plants.

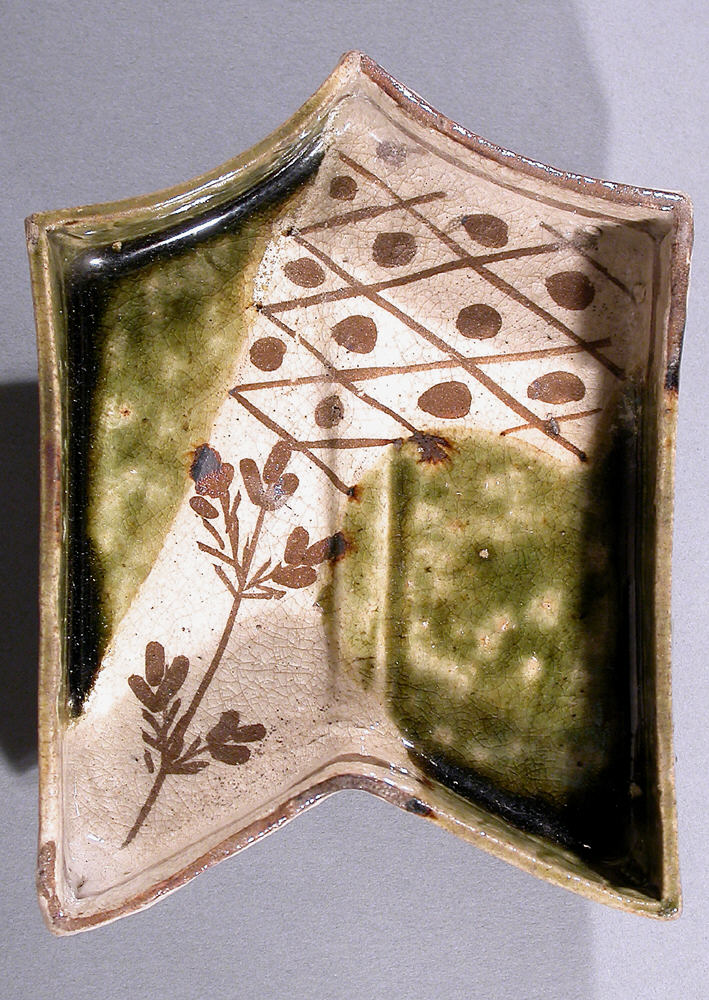
Green Oribe; dish in the shape of an arrow's fletching, early 17th century

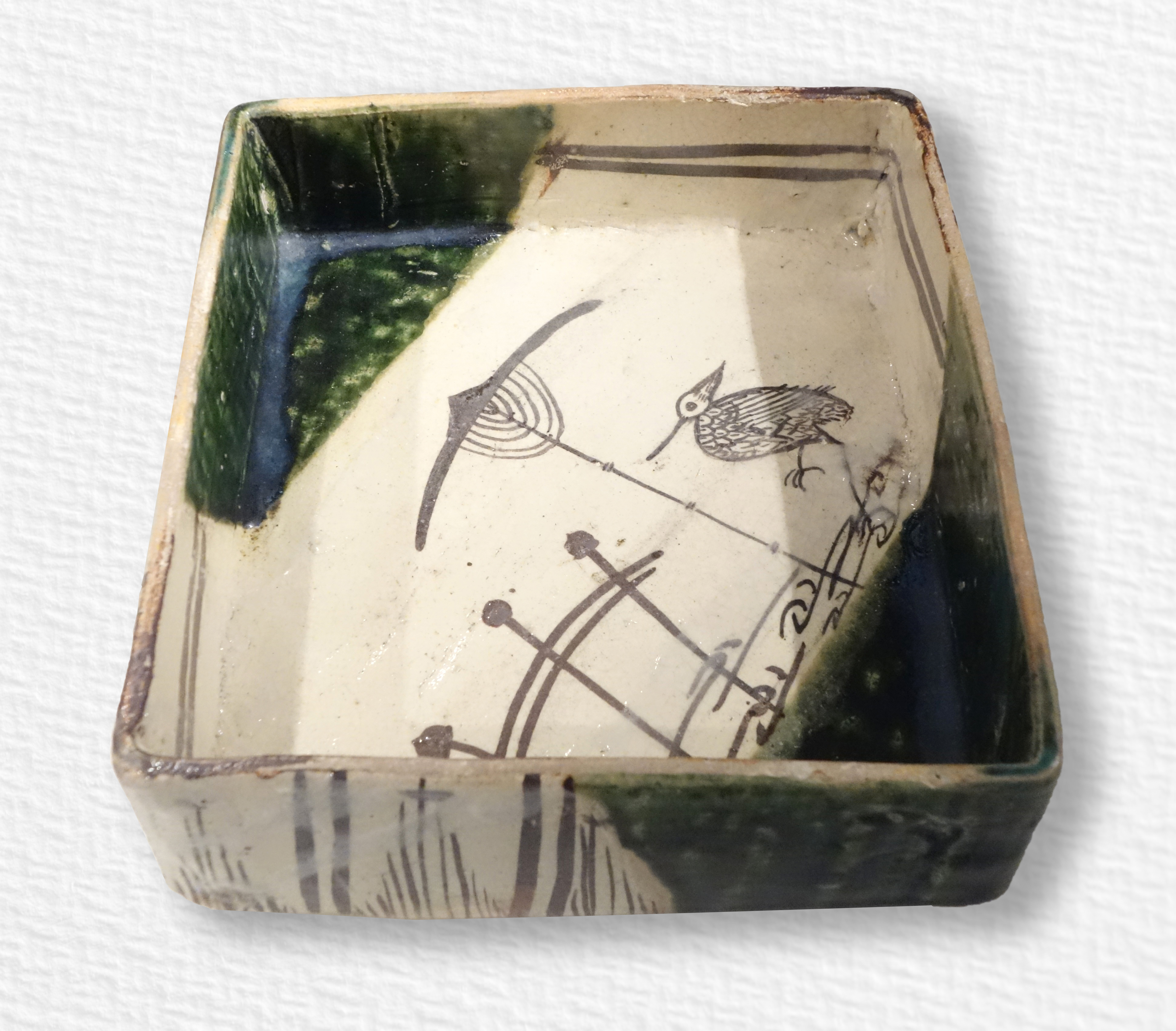
Square dish with bird design, approx. 1573–1615

=== Monochrome Oribe (sō-Oribe) ===
Monochrome Oribe is generally entirely covered with the distinctive copper green glaze (except for the foot of the item). Monochrome Oribe may be unadorned, but can also include small patterns or geometrical designs. These designs are often incised and are kept simple. Because this category of Oribe is often entirely coated in the recognizable green glaze, it is sometimes more easily categorized than other forms.

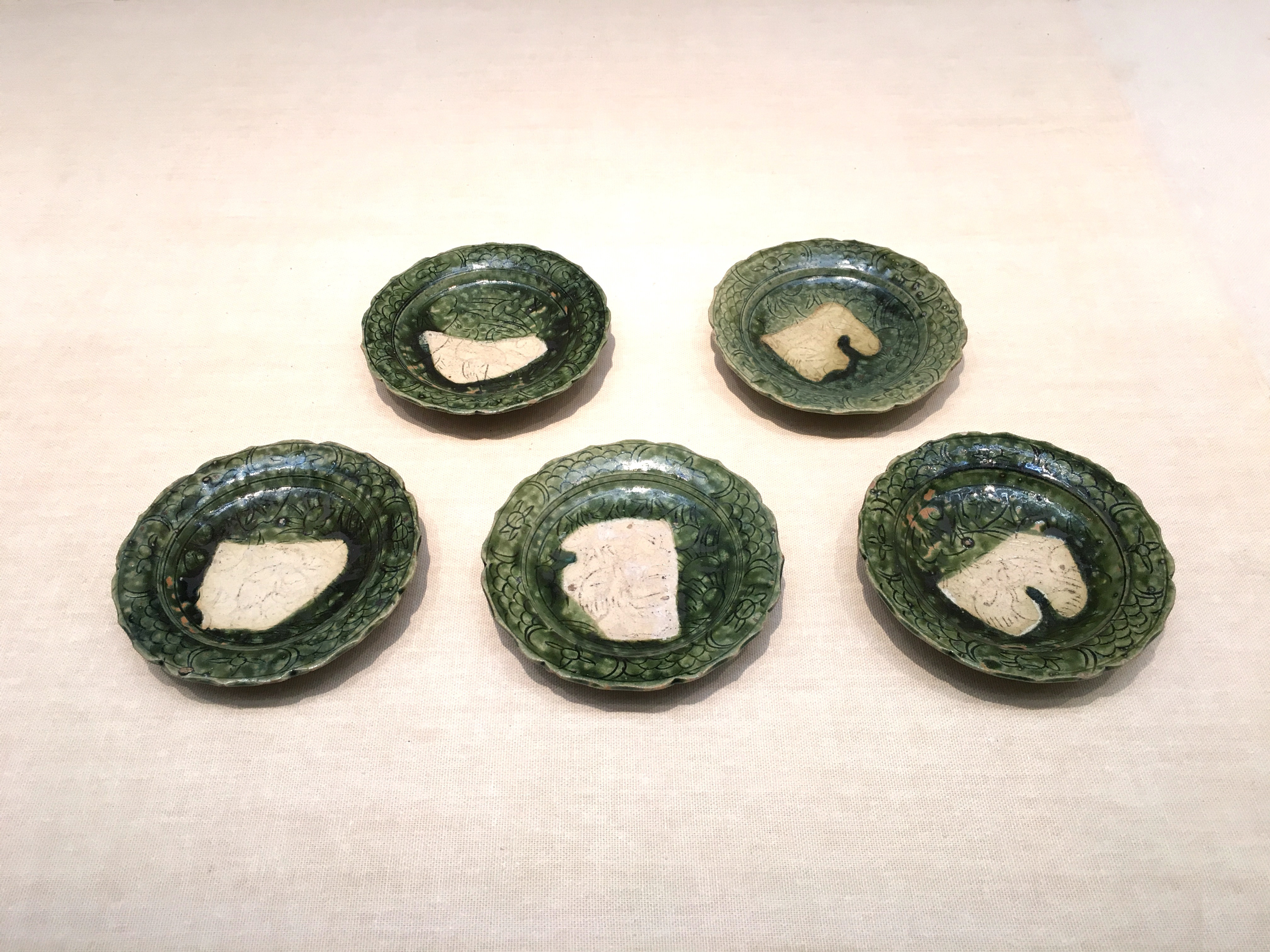
Foliated dishes, with carved design of a pair of herons, early 17th century.

=== Narumi Oribe ===
Narumi Oribe is recognizable by green glaze contrasted against a white slip, creating a welcome asymmetry. The clay is normally white and red, mixed and intermingling on a single piece to create what some scholars consider to be the most colorful type of Oribe. Designs can also include red or brown colors in moderation. Texture is often introduced in design and sometimes even by creating small imprints on the actual vessel, giving a multidimensional appearance.

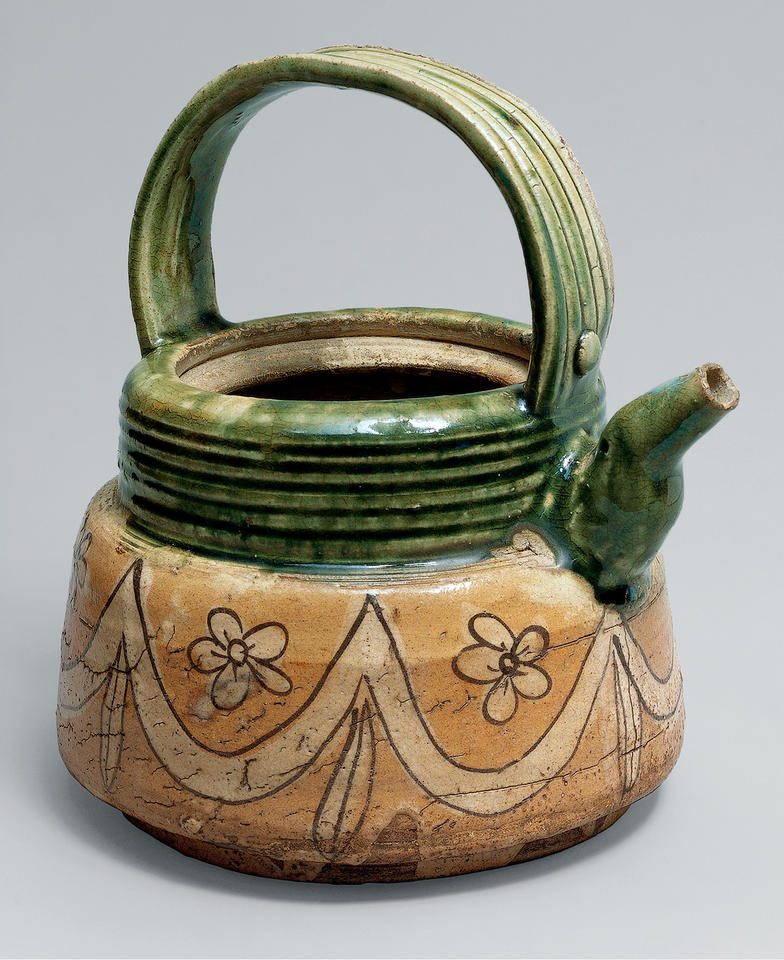
Narumi Oribe ware; ewer with cherry blossoms and picnic curtain, early 17th century

=== Red Oribe (aka Oribe) ===
This type of Oribe can be identified by a red background with green or brown colored designs. The red clay from Narumi Oribe is used as the base for these vessels, creating a generally reddish body, and designs are often more muted than other types of Oribe. Some art historians praise these pieces as striking the “perfect balance between liveliness and refinement.” Oftentimes, this type of Oribe features designs also done in white slip. Generally, there is no green glaze found on this category of Oribe ware.

Platform for Tea in the summer, 1595

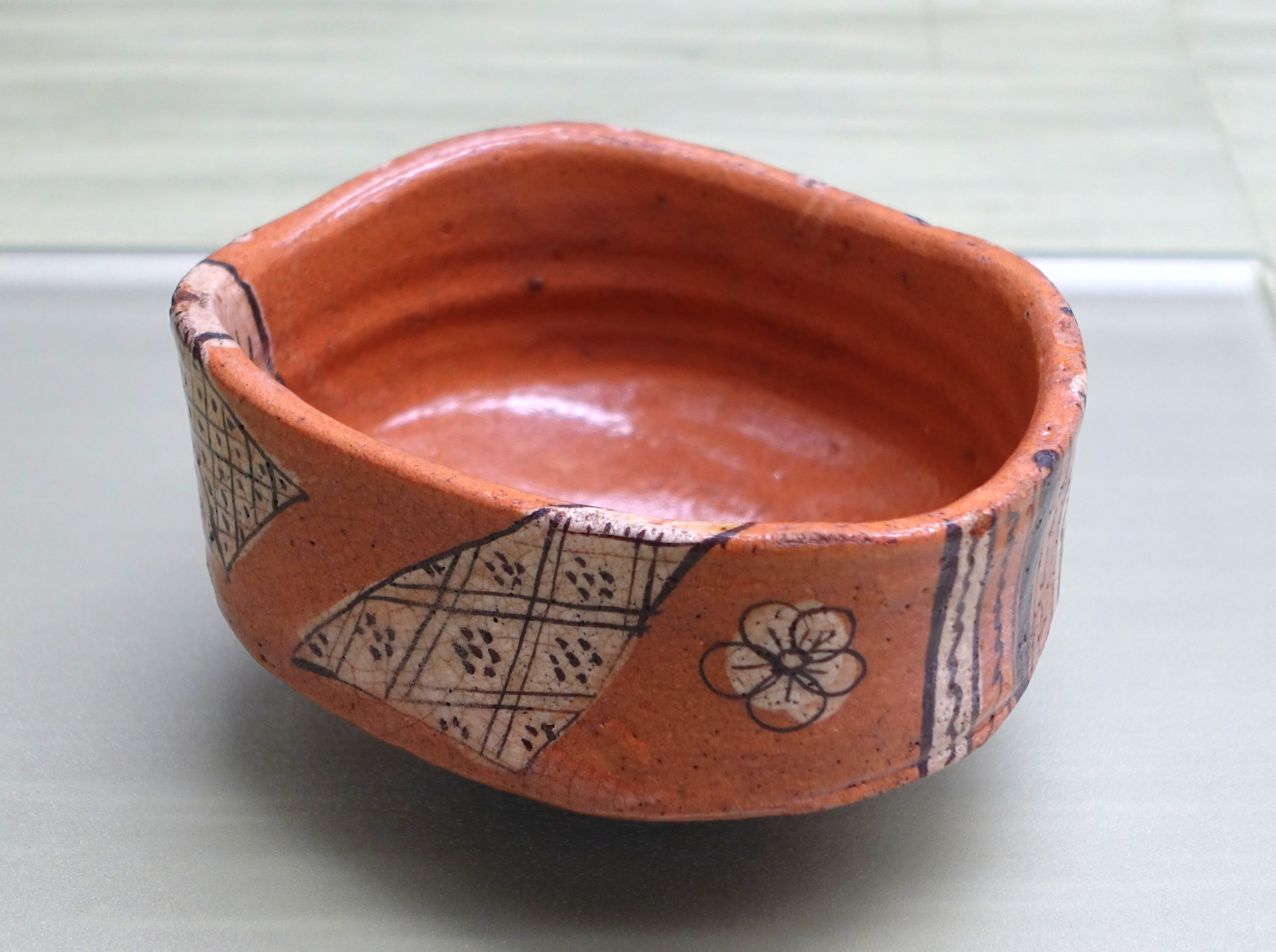
Tea bowl in shoe form, 1600s

=== Oribe Black (Oribe-guro) ===
These vessels are traditionally glazed entirely in black. To achieve this appearance, potters take the ceramics from the kiln and rapidly cool them, resulting in a very lustrous black glaze- a simple yet effective method. Tea bowls are commonly Oribe black, and often these tea bowls are in the “shoe” shape - the intentionally misshapen vessel - characteristic of Oribe ware.

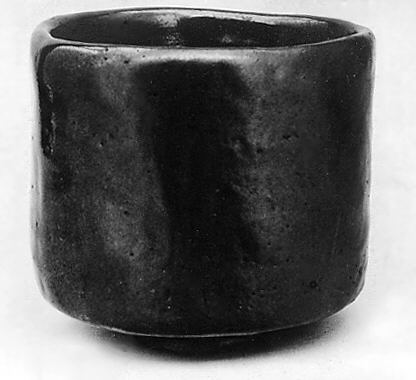
Clay covered with a thick, speckled glaze, 18th century

=== Black Oribe (黒織部, kuro-Oribe) ===
Black Oribe can be distinguished from Oribe Black in that Black Oribe features designs and white coloring. Many argue that this Oribe is easily and oftentimes confused with Black Seto, as the glazes are rather similar. Dark glaze is applied using a typical pouring or trailing method, but parts of the bowl may be left untouched. Then these empty areas are decorated with black iron wash, creating a beautiful contrast. Some scholars prefer to reference this kind of Oribe as black with decorations in some areas, as opposed to Oribe Black, which is generally all black in appearance and unadorned.

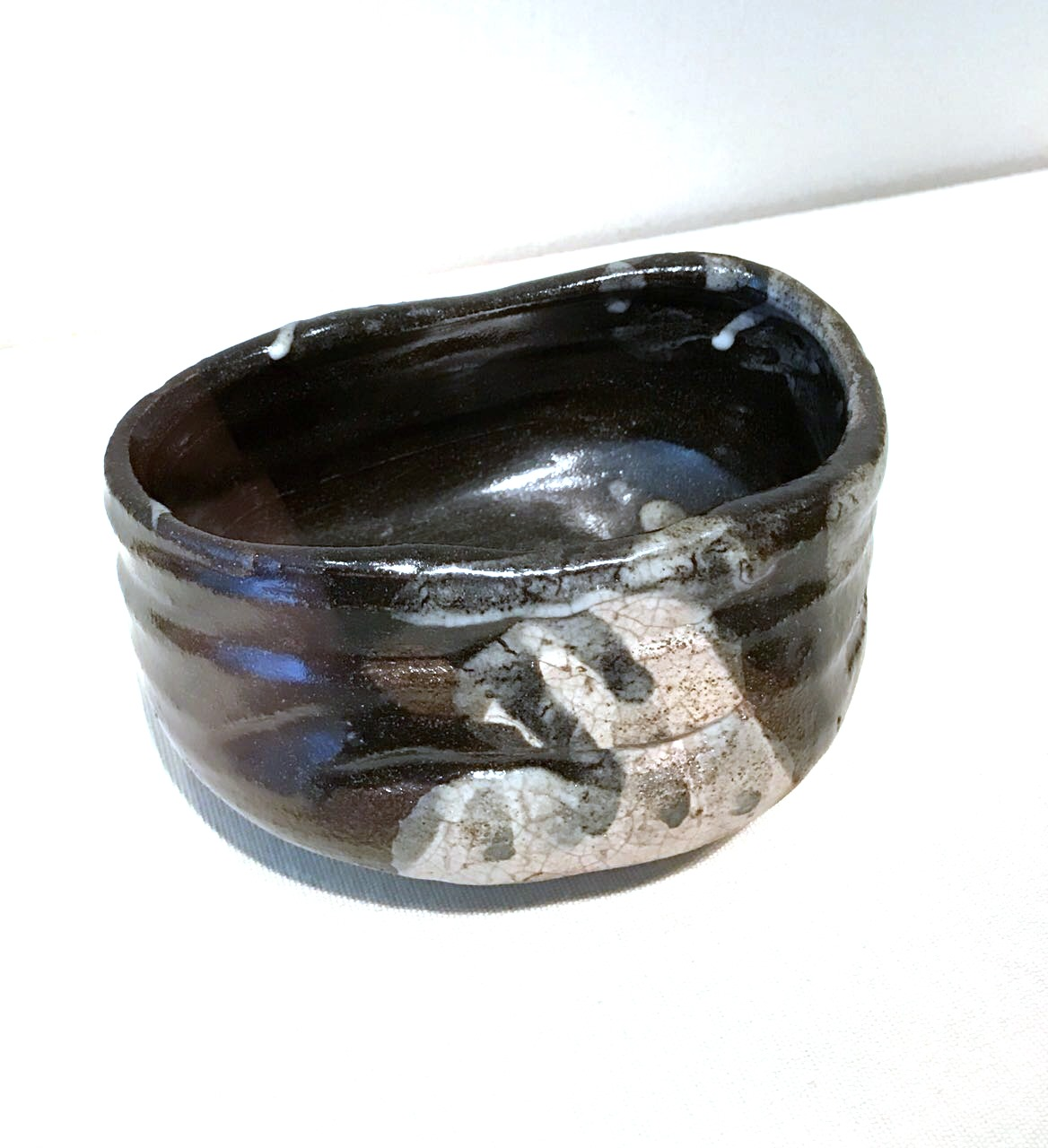
Black Oribe (kuro-Oribe), approx. 1600–1615

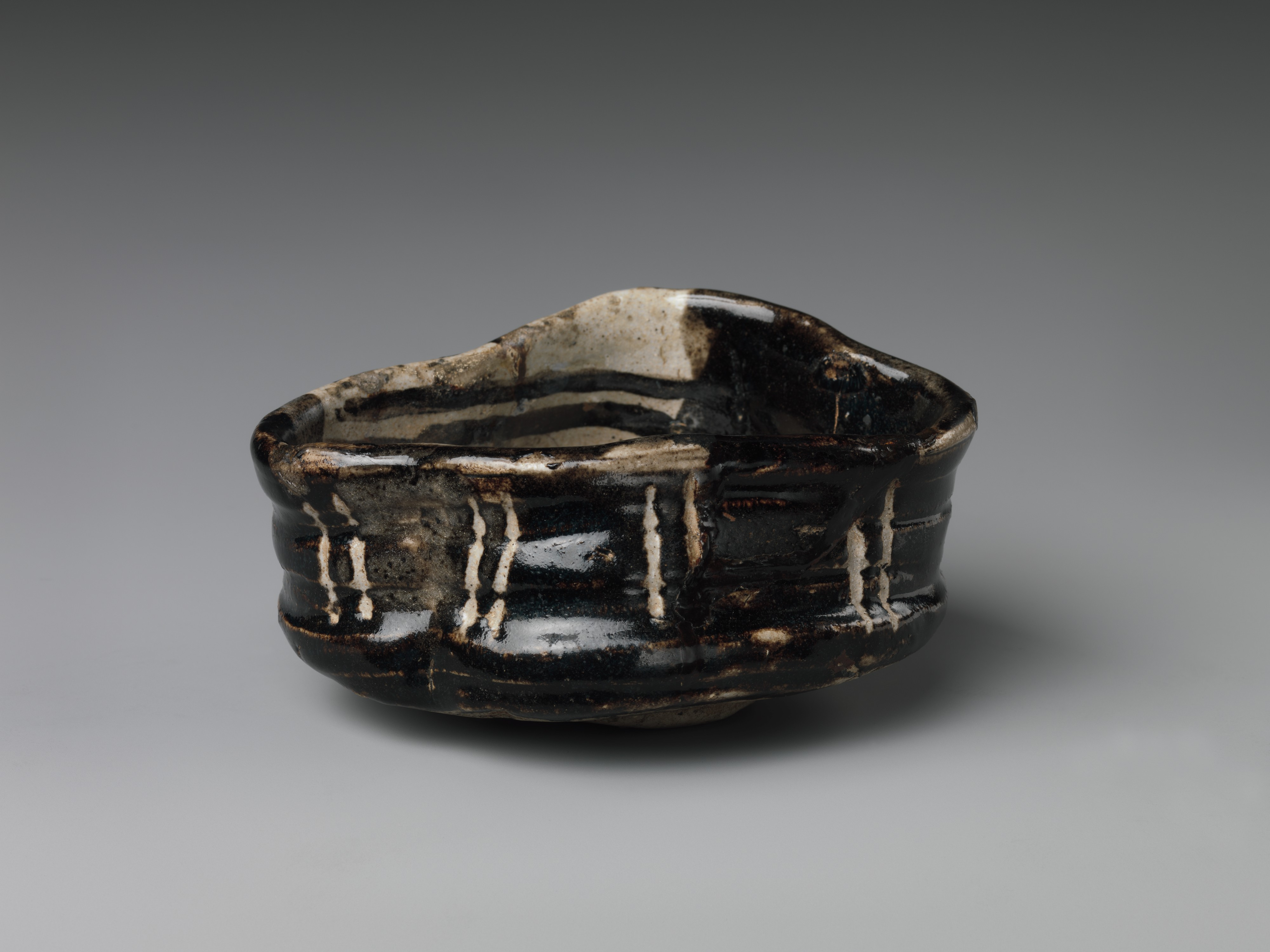
Stoneware with iron-black glaze, early 17th century

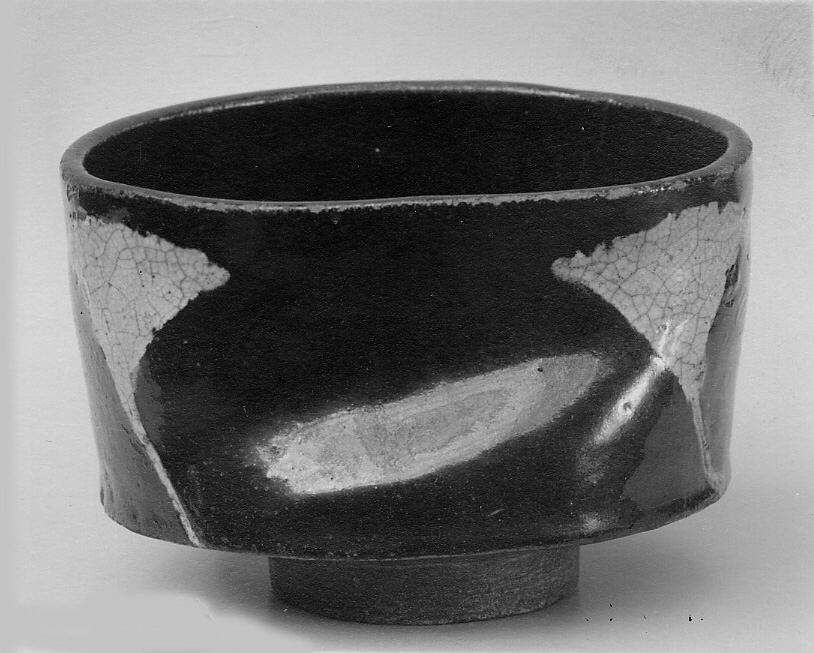
Clay covered with glaze and decoration, circa 1780

=== Shino Oribe (志野織部, also called Plain Oribe) ===
While the new kilns for producing Oribe were gaining popularity, it took some time for the older Shino kilns to fade away; for some time, potters of Shino kilns continued to fire Shino ware. Because of this, this ware is somewhat of a blend between Shino and Oribe, and bears characteristics from both wares. The techniques applied to these wares was reminiscent of Shino tradition, such as typical Shino designs; at the same time, stylistically, these wares included aspects also seen in Green Oribe wares, such as sharp and distinct iron-wash coloring. Often the glaze applied on Shino Oribe is much more thinly applied. Most importantly, this type of Oribe ware is distinct from Shino ware in that it lacks the red coloring of traditional Shino ware, instead favoring white glaze.

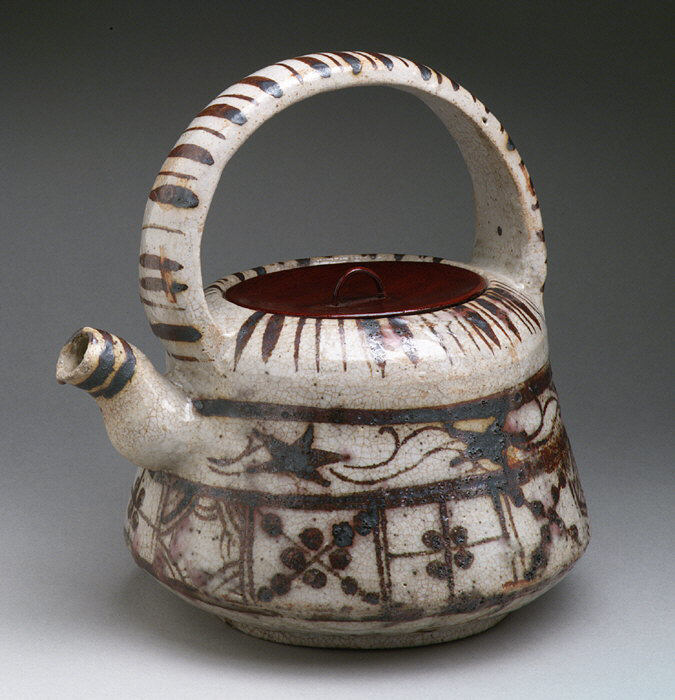
Shino Oribe, early 17th century

== See also ==
- Japanese pottery and porcelain
- Japanese craft
- List of Traditional Crafts of Japan
