= Kyōhei Katō =

Japanese photographer

- 加藤 恭平
- Born: 1909
- Died: 1983 (aged 73–74)
- Occupation: Photographer

Kyōhei Katō (加藤 恭平, Katō Kyōhei; 1909–1983) was a Japanese photographer.

In 1938, Katō was among the photographers involved in the Youth Reportage Photography Research Association (Seinen Hōdō Shashin Kenkyūkai), a group formed with the support of Photo Times that also included Ken Domon and Hiroshi Hamaya.
