= Hajime Katō (potter) =

Japanese potter

Hajime Katō (加藤土師萌, Katō Hajime) (March 7, 1900 – September 25, 1968) was a Japanese potter. He was named a Living National Treasure in 1961.

== Biography ==
He was born in Seto, Aichi prefecture. He served as an assistant in the Aichi Prefecture Ceramics school until 1921. In 1926 he moved to Mino, Gifu where he continued his research and experiments in pottery. In 1927, he won an award at the 8th Imperial Art Academy exhibition (today the Japan Art Academy). He won the Grand Prix at the 1937 Exposition Internationale des Arts et Techniques dans la Vie Moderne in Paris. During the war, he lived in Yokohama and studied Chinese Ming porcelain.

After the war he was appointed professor of the Ceramics department at Tokyo University of the Arts. On April 27, 1961, he was nominated as a Living National Treasure for enamels porcelain. In 1966, he became the president of the Japan Crafts Association and also became an expert committee member on the Council for Protection of Cultural Properties. In 1967 he became professor emeritus of the Tokyo University of the Art. The same year he was awarded the Purple Ribbon medal on behalf of the emperor.

== Works ==
He received a commission to decorate the Take-no-ma audience room of the new Tokyo Imperial Palace. His large, lidded vase in green brocade “Midoriji kinrande kazari tsubo” (緑地金襴手飾壺) is 1.53m in height. The same room also holds art pieces by Tatsuaki Kuroda and Heihachirō Fukuda.
