= Kyohei Inukai (born 1913) =

Kyohei Inukai (1913–1985) was a Japanese-American artist.

Earle Goodenow was born in Chicago in 1913 as the third son of parents Kyohei Inukai and Lucene Goodenow, both artists. He attended the Art Institute of Chicago. He also attended the National Academy of Design and the Art Students League in New York City. He initially worked as a commercial artist and with advertising agencies.

When his father died in 1954, Goodenow changed his name to Kyohei Inukai in honor of him. His eclectic career included being an illustrator of children's books, abstract oil paintings, ink wash painting in the Japanese style (sumi-e), silkscreen prints of geometric shapes, woodblock prints, and sculptures. He was part of both the American pop art and abstract art movements.

His paintings have been shown at the Albright-Knox Art Gallery, Portland Museum of Art, and the Rose Art Museum.

== See also ==
- Kyohei Inukai (born 1886)
