= Kyohei Inukai (born 1886) =

American painter

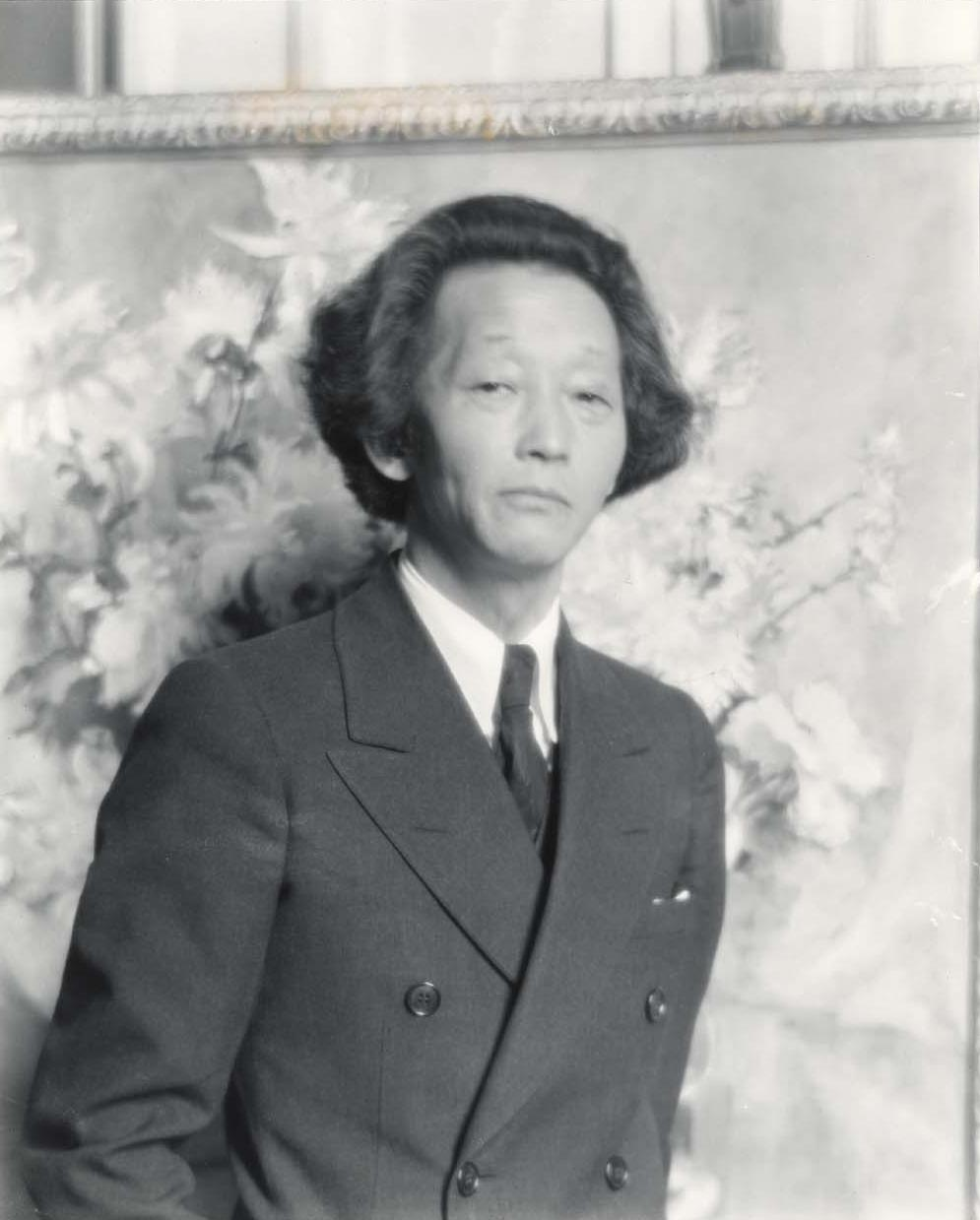

Kyohei Inukai (1886–1954) was a Japanese-American artist who painted portraits and watercolors during the early part of the twentieth century.

== Biography ==
Inuaki was born in Okayama, Japan in 1886. He immigrated to the United States at the age of 14, and trained as an artist at the Art Institute of Chicago. He married Lucene Goodenow and had three sons with her, including a son named Earle Goodenow (better known as Kyohei Inukai). He moved to New York City in 1915 where he maintained a successful career as an artist. One of his specialties was portraiture; he painted portraits of various members of New York's business elite, including Madison Grant and Thomas J. Watson, Sr. At some point by the 1930s, he divorced his wife and married Olivia Kirkland, an opera singer, as his second wife. The two had a fourth son together. He later had a long-running affair with Dorothy Hampton, who modeled for him even after other clients had abandoned him.

In 1925, his self-portrait was exhibited at the National Academy of Design in New York and the Pennsylvania Academy of the Fine Arts in Philadelphia. Currently the portrait is in the National Museum of Modern Art, Tokyo.

Inukai received the Maynard Prize in 1926 from the National Academy of Design.

While Inukai was reasonably successful in his day, World War II ruined his reputation and sent him into obscurity, as few Americans wished to continue patronizing a Japanese artist after the surprise attack at Pearl Harbor. There have since been attempts to rehabilitate him, though. A later notable exhibitions was a 2014 show at the Mead Art Museum at Amherst College which paired Inukai's work with portraiture by Robert Brackman. Much of Inukai's work and his scrapbook are owned by Miyoko and John Davey, a married couple and art collectors. The two have sought to raise Inukai's profile and reputation, and published a monograph containing Inukai's writings and work in 2014.

== See also ==
- Kyohei Inukai (born 1913)
