= List of Nihonga painters =

This is an alphabetical list of painters who are known for painting in the Nihonga style. Some artists also painted in the western Yōga style, and that the division between the two groups could be blurred at points.

Artists are listed by the native order of Japanese names, family name followed by given name, to ensure consistency even though some artists may be known outside Japan by their western-ordered name.

The list is broken down into the period during which the artist was first active: Meiji, Taishō, Shōwa and Heisei era.

== Meiji era (1868-1912) ==
- Hishida Shunsō 菱田春草 1874–1911
- Kawai Gyokudō 川合玉堂 1873–1957
- Maeda Seison 前田青邨 1885–1977
- Hirata Shōdō 平田松堂 1882–1971
- Otake Chikuha 尾竹 竹坡 1878–1936
- Shimomura Kanzan 下村観山 1873–1930
- Takeuchi Seihō 竹内栖鳳 1864–1942
- Tomioka Tessai 富岡鉄斎 1837–1924
- Uemura Shōen 上村松園 1875–1949
- Yasuda Yukihiko 安田靫彦 1884–1978
- Yokoyama Taikan 横山大観 1868–1958

== Taishō era (1912-1926) ==
- Hayami Gyoshū 速水御舟 1894–1935
- Itō Shinsui 伊東深水 1898–1972
- Kaburaki Kiyokata 鏑木清方 1878–1972
- Kawabata Ryūshi 川端龍子 1885–1966
- Murakami Kagaku 村上華岳 1888–1939
- Takehisa Yumeji 竹久夢二 1884–1934
- Tsuchida Bakusen 土田麦僊 1887–1936

== Shōwa era (1926-1989) ==
- Fuku Akino 秋野 不矩 1908–2001
- Dōmoto Inshō 堂本印象 1891–1975
- Higashiyama Kaii 東山魁夷 1908–1999
- Hirayama Ikuo 平山郁夫 1930–2009
- Fumiko Hori 堀文子 1918-2019
- Jeong Chan-young (정찬영, 鄭燦英) 1906-1988
- Katayama Bokuyō 片山牧羊, 1900–1937
- Kataoka Tamako 片岡球子 1905–2008
- Katō Eizō 加藤栄三 1906–1972
- Katō Tōichi 加藤東 1916–1996
- Khu Kim-liân 邱金蓮 1912- 2015
- Kim Ki-chang (김기창, 金基昶) 1913–2001
- Kitazawa Rakuten 北澤楽天 1876–1955
- Koizumi Junsaku 小泉淳作 1924–2012
- Kobayashi Kokei 小林古径 1883–1957
- Kueh Suat-ôo 郭雪湖 1908–2012
- Lîm Chi-chō͘ 林之助 1917–2008
- Lîm O-khîm林阿琴 1915–2020
- Lū Thiat-chiu 呂鐵州 1899–1942
- Gakuryō Nakamura 中村 岳陵 1890–1969
- Gōbara Kotō 鄉原古統 1887–1965
- Ogura Yuki 小倉遊亀 1895–2000
- Okuda Gensō 奥田元宋 1912–2003
- Okumura Togyū 奥村土牛 1889–1990
- Phêⁿ Iông-mūi 彭蓉妹 1912-?
- Reiji Hiramatsu 平松 礼二 1941-
- Sugiyama Yasushi 杉山寧 1909–1993
- Tanaka Isson 田中一村 1908–1977
- Tân Chìn 陳進 1907–1988
- Tomohide Dote 土手朋英 1944-*Uchida Aguri 内田あぐり 1949-
- Tân Soat-kun 陳雪君 1912-?
- Tshuà Suat-khe 蔡雪溪 1884-1964?
- Tsiu Hông-tiû 周紅綢 1914 -1981
- Uchida Aguri 内田あぐり 1949-
- Yamaguchi Kayō 山口華楊 1899–1984
- Yun Yeo-sang (윤여상, 尹汝尙)

== Heisei era (1989-2019) ==
- Gotō Jin 後藤仁 1968-
- Matsui Fuyuko 松井冬子 1974-
- Nishida Shun'ei 西田俊英 1953-
- Noguchi Tetsuya 野口哲哉 1980-

== See also ==
- List of Yōga painters
- List of Japanese painters
