= Menard Art Museum =

- メナード美術館
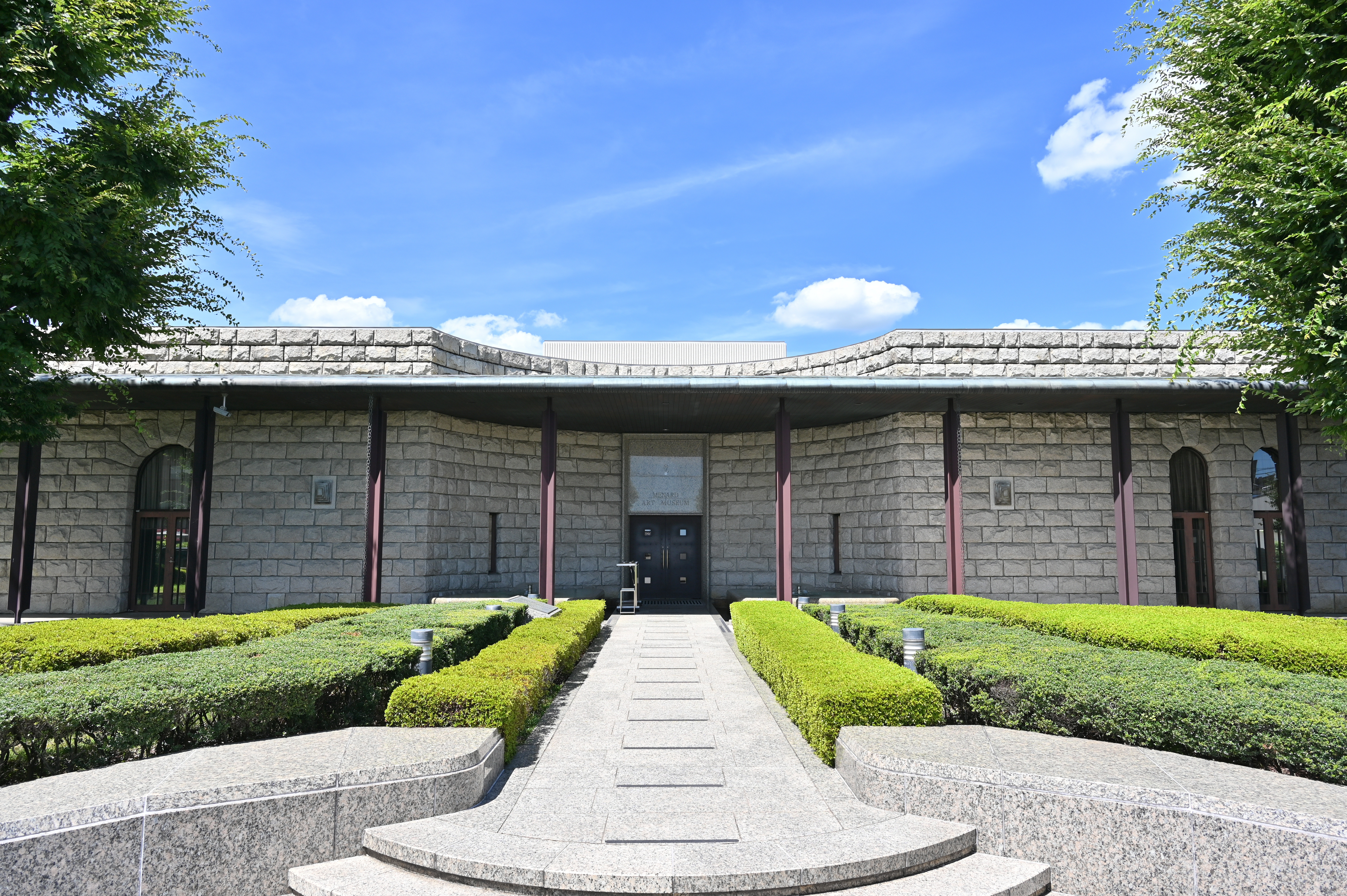
- Established: 1987
- Location: Komaki, Aichi, Japan
- Coordinates: 35.2889°N 136.9198°E
- Type: Museum
- Founder: Nippon Menard Cosmetic Co.
- Website: museum.menard.co.jp

The Menard Art Museum (メナード美術館) is a museum located in Komaki, Aichi Prefecture, Japan. The museum was founded by the owners of Nippon Menard Cosmetic Co. and opened in 1987.

Art works in the permanent collection include "Portrait of Jeanne Martin in hat adorned with rose" by Édouard Manet (1881), and "Man in a Field or Evening, the End of the Day" (1889) by Dutch painter Vincent van Gogh.

The museum has a large collection of Japanese paintings of the 19th and 20th centuries. On display are both works of art in traditional Japanese style of painting (Nihonga), as well as images that have been influenced by Western art movements (Yōga). Paintings in traditional Japanese style are by Tawaraya Sōtatsu, Ogata Kōrin, Katsushika Oi, Yokoyama Taikan, Uemura Shōen, Kobayashi Kokei, Yasuda Yukihiko, Maeda Seison, Murakami Kagaku, Okumura Togyū, Fukuda Heihachirō, Hayami Gyoshū, Higashiyama Kaii, Takayama Tatsuo, Kayama Matazō and Hirayama Ikuo.

Among the Western influenced artists found in the collection are Fujishima Takeji, Okada Saburōsuke, Yasui Sōtarō, Umehara Ryūzaburō, Kuniyoshi Yasuo, Kishida Ryūsei, Yamaguchi Takeo, Munakata Shikō, Nakamura Tsune, Kanji Maeta, Saeki Yūzō and Koide Narashige.

== Collection ==
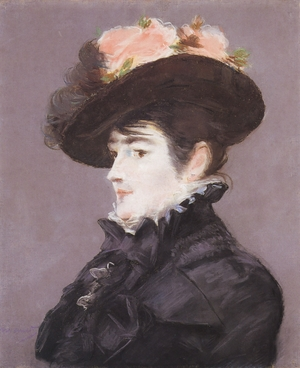
Portrait of Jeanne Martin in hat adorned with rose by Manet (1881)

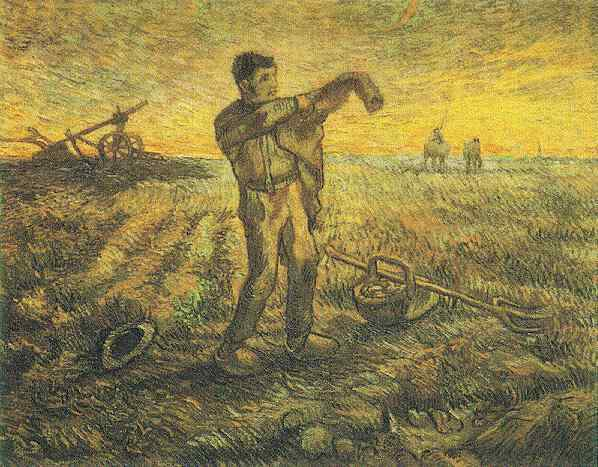
Man in a Field or Evening, the End of the Day by van Gogh (1889)
