= Aguri =

Aguri may refer to:

== Places ==
- Aguri (caste), Bengali Hindu agricultural caste in India

== People ==
- Aguri Uchida (内田 あぐり; born 1949), Japanese painter in the nihonga style of watercolour painting
- Aguri Suzuki (鈴木 亜久里; born 1960), former racing driver from Japan
- Aguri Igarashi (五十嵐 あぐり; born 1975), female manga artist from Japan
- Aguri Ōnishi (大西 亜玖璃; born 1997), Japanese actress

== Pop culture ==
  - Aguri Suzuki F-1 Super Driving, Formula One simulator for the Super Nintendo Entertainment System
  - Autobacs Racing Team Aguri, joint racing project between former F1 driver Aguri Suzuki and Autobacs Seven Co
  - Team Aguri, Formula E race team founded by former F1 driver Aguri Suzuki
  - Super Aguri (disambiguation)

== Fictional characters ==
- Aguri Yukimura, a character in Assassination Classroom
- Aguri Sakurano, a character in Gamers!
