= DOTE =

DOTE, Dote or Doté may refer to:

- Dancing on the Edge Festival, a biannual performing arts festival in the Netherlands
- Department of Technical Education, a body of the government of Kerala, India
- Director, Operational Test and Evaluation, a staff assistant and adviser to the US Secretary of Defense
- Distributed Open Transcription Environment, a transcription software

== People with the surname ==
- Élie Doté (born 1948), former prime minister of the Central African Republic
- Franck Doté (born 1975), Togolese former footballer
- Tomohide Dote (born 1944), Japanese Nihonga painter
