= Yuki Ogura =

Japanese artist (1895–2000)

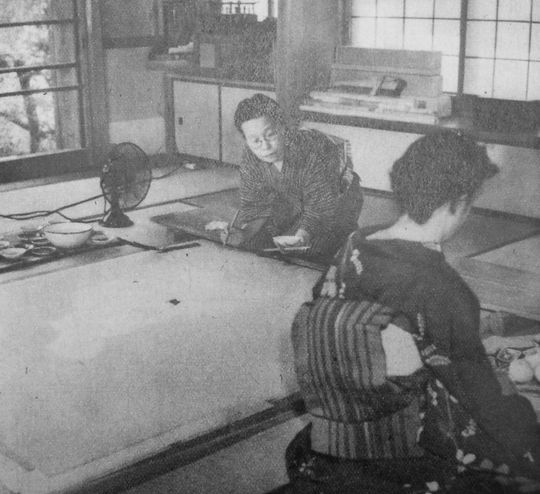
- Yuki Ogura in 1948
- Born: Mizoguchi Yuki; 1 March 1895; Ōtsu, Shiga, Japan
- Died: 23 July 2000 (aged 105); Kamakura, Kanagawa, Japan
- Known for: Painter
- Notable work: Bathing Women
- Movement: Nihonga
- Awards: Order of Culture

Yuki Ogura (小倉 遊亀, Ogura Yuki; 1 March 1895 – 23 July 2000) was a Japanese nihonga painter. Her maiden name was Yuki Mizoguchi. She was known for her bijinga.

== Biography ==
Yuki Mizoguchi (aka Mizoguchi Yuki) was born in Ōtsu city, Shiga Prefecture and graduated from the Nara Women's Normal School (the predecessor of Nara Women's University). She was employed as a school teacher, but her interest in art led her to study under noted Nihonga painter Yukihiko Yasuda in 1920. In 1926, her painting Kyuri ("Cucumbers") was selected for an Inten Exhibition by the Japan Fine Arts Academy (Nihon Bijutsu-in). She became the first female member of the Japan Fine Arts Academy in 1932. She specialized in graceful family scenes, still life, and pictures of women. During the 1950s and 1960s, she painted many large portraits of friends and family members in the nude. Although Ogura never departed from the traditional framework of the Nihonga style, her figure paintings are often described by contemporary critics as "modern," both in style and content. A prolific artist, in 1976, she was selected to become a member of the Japan Art Academy (Nihon Geijitsu-in), and later become honorary chairperson of that organization. She was awarded the Order of Culture in 1980 and is one of only three women painters (the others being fellow Nihonga painters Uemura Shōen and Kataoka Tamako) to be so honored. Her studio and home were located in Kamakura, where she lived to the age of 105.

== Famous works ==
- Yuami Onna ("Bathing Women", 1938)
- Oyako ("Mother and Child", 1961)
- Maiko ("Apprentice Geisha", 1962)
