= Kajita Hanko =

Japanese painter (1870-1917)

Kajita Hanko (梶田半古; July 23, 1870–April 23, 1917) was a Japanese painter.

== Biography ==
Kajita's birth name was Jojirō Kajita. He was born the son of a metal engraver in Shitaya, Tokyo on July 23, 1870. He studied under Nabeta Gyokuei and Ohara Koson. He participated in forming several arts organizations, and was best known for creating illustrations for magazines and newspapers.

He married the writer Kitada Usurai in 1898. They had a child, Hiroe, the next year. Kitada died of intestinal tuberculosis soon afterward, in 1900. Kajita died on April 23, 1917, of tuberculosis.

Kajita's students include Kokei Kobayashi, Seison Maeda, and Togyū Okumura, among others.

== Collections ==
- British Museum
- Metropolitan Museum of Art
- Minneapolis Institute of Art
