= Maya Lewandowsky =

Israeli-Canadian choreographer

- מאיה לבנדובסקי
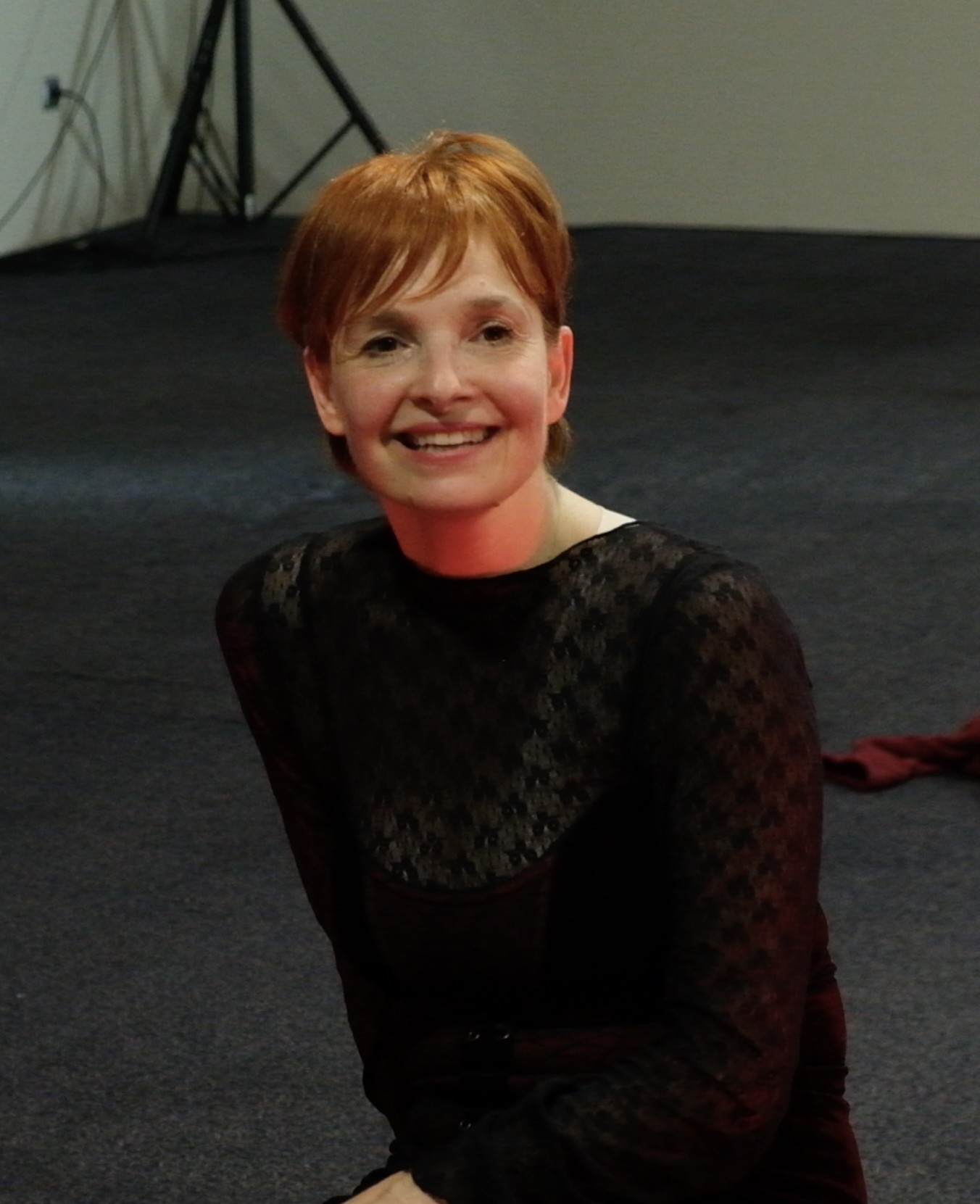
- Born: 1972 (age 53–54); Tel Aviv, Israel
- Education: Royal Academy of Dance
- Occupations: Choreographer, vocalist, interdisciplinary performer
- Years active: 1990s–present
- Notable work: The Corridor, The Dybbuk, Fihi Ma Fihi

Maya Lewandowsky (Hebrew: מאיה לבנדובסקי; born 1972) is an Israeli–Canadian choreographer, vocalist and interdisciplinary performer best known as the founding artistic director of Calgary‑based La Caravan Dance Theatre.

== Early life and education ==
Lewandowsky was born in Tel Aviv and trained first at the Bat‑Dor Dance Studio; she later completed the Advanced diploma of the Royal Academy of Dance in London and graduated from the Telma Yelin High School for the Arts in Givatayim. She was a recipient of the America-Israel Cultural Foundation scholarship. Alongside her dance studies, she studied classical opera singing and contemporary vocal techniques with notable teachers from Tel Aviv University’s Faculty of Music in Israel.

== Career ==
During the 1990s, Lewandowsky danced as a soloist with the Bat-Dor Dance Company and appeared in musical‑theatre productions ranging from West Side Story at Habima National Theatre to children's repertory for the Israeli Opera.

For two years, Lewandowsky was a performer for the Inbal Pinto Avshalom Pollak and toured internationally with the productions Oyster and Wrapped. In 2002, she relocated to Calgary and launched La Caravan Dance Theatre the following year, which is known for its interdisciplinary performances. She is often referred to as Marie Chouinard of Calgary. Early works such as The Corridor (2005) attracted national attention; Vancouver's Georgia Straight noted that the Israeli‑born director "blends the technical grace of ballet with the physically pummelling crashes of La La La Human Steps and the theatrical costumes of Cirque’s Quidam." Subsequent festival appearances at the Dancing on the Edge saw Lewandowsky attach microphones to dancers’ bodies to embody and amplify breath and screams, a gesture The Dance Current called one of the "wild imaginings" that made her company "the edgiest show at this year’s festival."

Major productions include The Dybbuk (High Performance Rodeo, 2013) and the dance‑opera Fihi Ma Fihi (It Is What It Is), premiered at Theatre Junction Grand in 2016. Outside Canada, she has presented choreography in Europe and Asia and is known as the creator of the "Free Your Natural Voice" method, a holistic vocal training technique.
