= Yasushi Sugiyama =

Japanese painter (1909–1993)

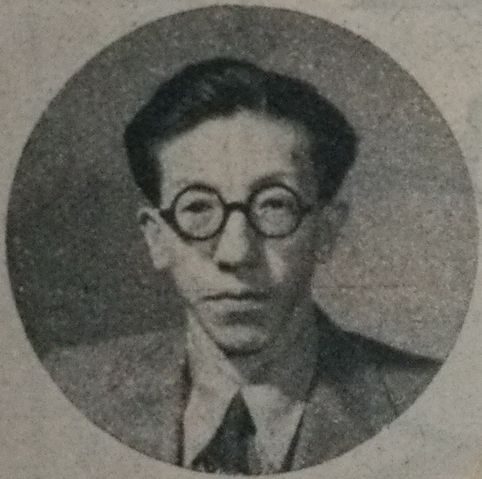
Yasushi Sugiyama in 1951

Yasushi Sugiyama (杉山 寧, Sugiyama Yasushi; 20 October 1909 – 20 October 1993) was a Japanese painter of the Shōwa and Heisei eras, who practiced the nihonga style of watercolour painting.

== Biography ==
Sugiyama was born in 1909 in Asakusa, the eldest son of the owner of a stationery shop. In 1928, Sugiyama enrolled in the Tokyo Art School (now the Tokyo National University of Fine Arts and Music). He formed the "rusōgasha" (瑠爽画社) along with Yamamoto Kyujin and Takayama Tatsuo, and participated positively in the movement to reform nihonga. His paintings are characteristized by peacefulness filled with a sense of security, owing to excellent sketching ability and solid construction.

In 1958, his eldest daughter married Yukio Mishima. As a reason for choosing her, Mishima suggested "because she was the daughter of an artist, so she wouldn't hold to many of the illusions people have about artists".

He received a commission to design the carpets of Tokyo Imperial Palace. His stylized pattern of clouds (kumo) was used in the Shunju-no-Ma, a grand hall with an area of 608 square meters, or about 184 tsubo. He also designed the pattern of grass (kusa), which was used in the Houmei-Den, the largest hall with an area of 915 square meters, or about 280 tsubo.

In 1974, Sugiyama was awarded the Order of Culture.

== Famous works ==
- 穹 (1964, Tokyo National Museum of Modern Art)

== See also ==
- Gakuryō Nakamura
- Seison Maeda
- Yokoyama Taikan
- Kaii Higashiyama
- List of Nihonga painters
