= Nishida Shun'ei =

Japanese painter

Nishida Shun'ei (西田 俊英; born April 20, 1953, in Ise city, Mie prefecture, Japan) is a Japanese Nihonga painter who specializes in portraits, and later fantastical landscapes, and is an emeritus professor of Japanese painting at Hiroshima City University and Musashino Art University, which he retired from in 2024. He received the 2016 Japan Art Academy award for Japanese painting. As of 2026, he is the chair of the Japan Art Institute.

== Biography ==
In 1977, Nishida graduated from Musashino Art University, Department of Japanese Painting, where he studied with Togyu Okumura and Hideo Shiode.

Nishida Shun'ei was greatly inspired by Indian culture, and in 1993 went to study painting for a year as an Overseas Training Fellow of the Japanese Agency for Cultural Affairs. While in India he was awakened to portraiture and in 1995 received the Nihon Bijutsuin (Japan Art Institute) Award as well as the newly established Adachi Museum of Art Award for his Pushkar no Rojin ("Old man of Pushkar"), depicting the face of an Indian village chief. In 2022, his work inspired by India was exhibited in Hamamatsu City alongside the work of another India-inspired Japanese artist, Fuku Akino.

In 1996 he won the Tenshin Memorial Ibaraki Award for Jakko ("Serene Light") depicting a young monk of Ladakh. In 1997 he received the Nihon Bijutsuin (Japan Art Institute) Award for the second time for "Carlos", which was praised for its use of light in depicting the life and feelings of the subject. Shun'ei was recommended for dōnin ("member") of the institute.

The exhibition Inochi no Sanka led to the publication of the book of the same name in 2003.

Nishida Shun'ei is a Donin (member) and Hyogi-in (Councillor) of the Japan Art Institute. On 22 June 2026, he was announced as the chair of the institute. He is also a member of the Japan Art Academy.

He has been inspired by nature, including Yakushima National Park. His work "The Phoenix" drew from his 2022 year-long stay there. It is 2.05m high and over 50m long, and planned to be twice that length.

== Awards and exhibitions ==
- 1971 – Won Chubu Shunyo kai Award, selected at Shunyo kai 3 times.
- 1983 – Received the Award of Excellence in the 7th Yamatane Museum of Art Award Exhibition.
- 1984 – Gained the Grand Prize of 84 Tokyo Central Museum Japanese Painting Grand Prize Exhibition.
- 1990 – Obtained the Contemporary Art Exhibition Recommendation Award in the first Ryoyo no Me Exhibition. Exhibited at the Contemporary Screen Painting Exhibition (Western Germany and the others).
- 1995 – Won the 50th and 51st spring In-ten (Japan Art Institute Exhibition) Encouragement Award. Received the Japan Fine Arts Institute Exhibition Award Taikan Award in the 80th In-ten. Gained the 1st Adachi Museum of Art Award.
- 1996 – Received the Encouragement Award of the 81st In-ten, the Tenshin Memorial Ibaraki Award and the Scholarship Award of the Japan Art Institute. Exhibited at the 30th Contemporary Art Selective Exhibition of the Agency for the Cultural Affairs (In 1998, 2003 and 2006 as well).
- 1997 – Won the Japan Fine Arts Institute Exhibition Award Taikan Award in the 82nd In-ten. The Exhibition of excellent artworks purchased by the Agency for Cultural Affairs in 1997 (Ueno Nihon Geijutsu Kaikan).
- 1998 – Recommended as Donin (member) at the Japan Art Institute.
- 2002 – Received the Minister of Culture, Education and Science Award in the 87th In-ten. Private exhibition of Nishida, Shun'ei ~Prayer~ (Mitsukoshi Department main store and other places).
- 2003 – Retrospective exhibition of Nishida, Shun'ei ~ In Praise of Life ~ (Imai Museum).
- 2004 – Private exhibition of Nishida, Shun'ei ~ Tranquil time ~ (Seibu Art Forum and other places).
- 2005 – Won the Prime Minister’s Award in the 90th In-ten (Japan Art Institute). Private exhibition of Nishida, Shunei ~ In the Light ~ (at Matsuzakaya Department main store and other places). Private exhibition ~ Nostalgia ~ (Tenmanya main store and other places).
- 2006 – Won the 12th Adachi Museum of Art Award in the 91st In-ten for "Cranes in Kibi".
- 2008 – Private exhibition of Nishida, Shun'ei～On My Way~(Daimaru Department main store and other places).
- 2014 - Won the 10th Adachi Museum of Art Spring Award for "Perception" (Kan), showing a Borzoi dog looking at tbe sky
- 2016 - 75th Japan Art Academy award for Japanese painting, for the painting "Inhabitants of the Forest"

== Works ==
1983

- Flower Decorations before a Buddhist Image (150×162)

1984

- Holy Bull (116.7×91)

1990

- Morning (97×193.9)

1995

- Painter of Minituarl (100×100)
- Old Man of Pushkar (218×172)

1996

- Old Man in Mountain (100×100)
- Hints of Light (210×172)

1997

- Carlos (72×210)

2002

- King 182×498 (Screen painting)

2005

- Moon in February (182×332)

2006

- Cranes in Kibi (Screen painting)
