= Kajita =

Kajita (written 梶田) is a surname of Japanese origin. Notable people with this surname include:

- Kajita Hanko (梶田 半古, 1870–1917), Japanese painter
- Nagi Kajita (梶田 渚, born 2000), Japanese artistic gymnasts
- Takaaki Kajita (梶田 隆章, born 1959), Japanese physicist
- Takahiro Kajita (梶田 隆弘, born 1976), Japanese mixed martial artist
- Mafia Kajita (梶田 隆基, born 1987), Japanese actor

== See also ==
- Kajita Station
