= Tamako Kataoka =

Japanese painter (1905–2008)

- 片岡球子
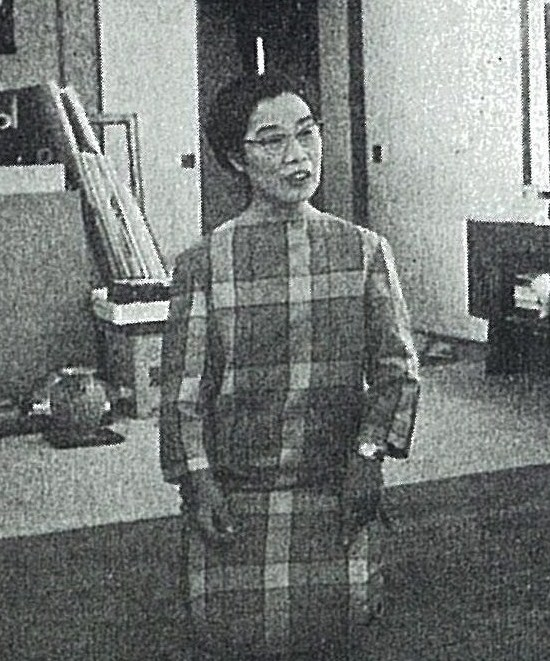
- Kataoka Tamako in 1962
- Born: 5 January 1905; Sapporo, Hokkaido
- Died: 16 January 2008 (aged 103)
- Style: Nihonga

Tamako Kataoka (片岡球子, Kataoka Tamako) (5 January 1905 in Sapporo – 16 January 2008) was a Japanese Nihonga painter.

She is known for her series of Mount Fuji and other mountains, painted in bold colours such as red.

== Biography ==
Tamako Kataoka was born in Sapporo, Japan in 1905. In 1923, she enrolled to study the traditional Japanese painting style Nihonga at the Women's Special School of Art in Tokyo. She decided to further her studies and acquired a teaching post at Ooka state primary school in Yokohama for the next thirty years, and at the Women's University of Fine Art for another fifteen. In 1962, Kataoka traveled to Europe, visiting France, Italy, and the UK. It was during this forty-day excursion that the western influence in her work stemmed.

Art critic Sarah Custen describes Kataoka's unique response to the influence of popular American artists: "Kataoka’s landscapes evoke Georgia O'Keeffe, and her ‘Countenance’ series is undeniably reminiscent of Warhol's pop art, yet her work is far from imitative. While much of Japanese art is dedicated to faithful replication, Kataoka's paintings sing as true, individual expression." For example, Kataoka often uses gold leaf and silver to highlight portions of her prints, a technique seen in many Nihonga paintings before her. “By painting a picture of a traditional scene…one can participate in a process of defining what a tradition is.”

By the mid sixties, she became the department head of the Aichi Prefectural University of the Arts. It was here that she taught students who were eager to modernize the style of traditional Japanese art. After seeing her work, a fellow artist by the name of Kobayashi Kokei recognized the greatness in it. He exclaimed that her work straddled “the line between being inferior and an authentic masterpiece” and encouraged her to continue. She designed one of the curtains at the Nagoya Kabuki Misono-za theatre called "Flowers at Mount Fuji" (富士に献花).

Kataoka was later appointed a member of the Japan Art Academy in 1982, and awarded the Order of Culture in 1989.

== See also ==
- Seison Maeda (1885–1977), one of the leading Nihonga painters
- List of Nihonga painters
