= Kitada Usurai =

Kitada Usurai (北田薄氷; March 14, 1876–November 5, 1900) was a Japanese writer.

== Biography ==
Kitada's birth name was Kitada Takako. She was the second daughter of a lawyer named Kitada Masatada. She grew up and attended school in Tokyo. Her education was interrupted by the death of her mother when she was 14, which left her and her sister to care for their siblings. She began writing at 17 years old. After being introduced to him by a friend of her father's, she showed one of her stories to Ozaki Kōyō, who took her on as his first female apprentice. As her skills improved, he gave her the pen name "Usurai".

She made her literary debut with Sannin Yamome in 1894. The short story was well-received, with one reporter calling her "Murasaki of the Meiji period" and another describing her as the "female Ozaki Kōyō". Her stories were often about the submission of women to men, but she did not advocate for women's rights like other Meiji period women writers did. Instead, the themes and content of her work show a sense of resignation and dissatisfaction with the status quo.

Ozaki also introduced her to a painter, Kajita Hanko. They were married in 1898 and had a child, Hiroe, the next year. However, her health took a precipitous decline after giving birth, and she died of intestinal tuberculosis on November 5, 1900.

== Selected works ==
- Sannin Yamome (三人やもめ) 1894
- Kuromegane (黒眼鏡) 1895
- "Onisenbiki: The Thousand Devils" [English trans. 1903]
