= Gakuryō Nakamura =

- 中村岳陵
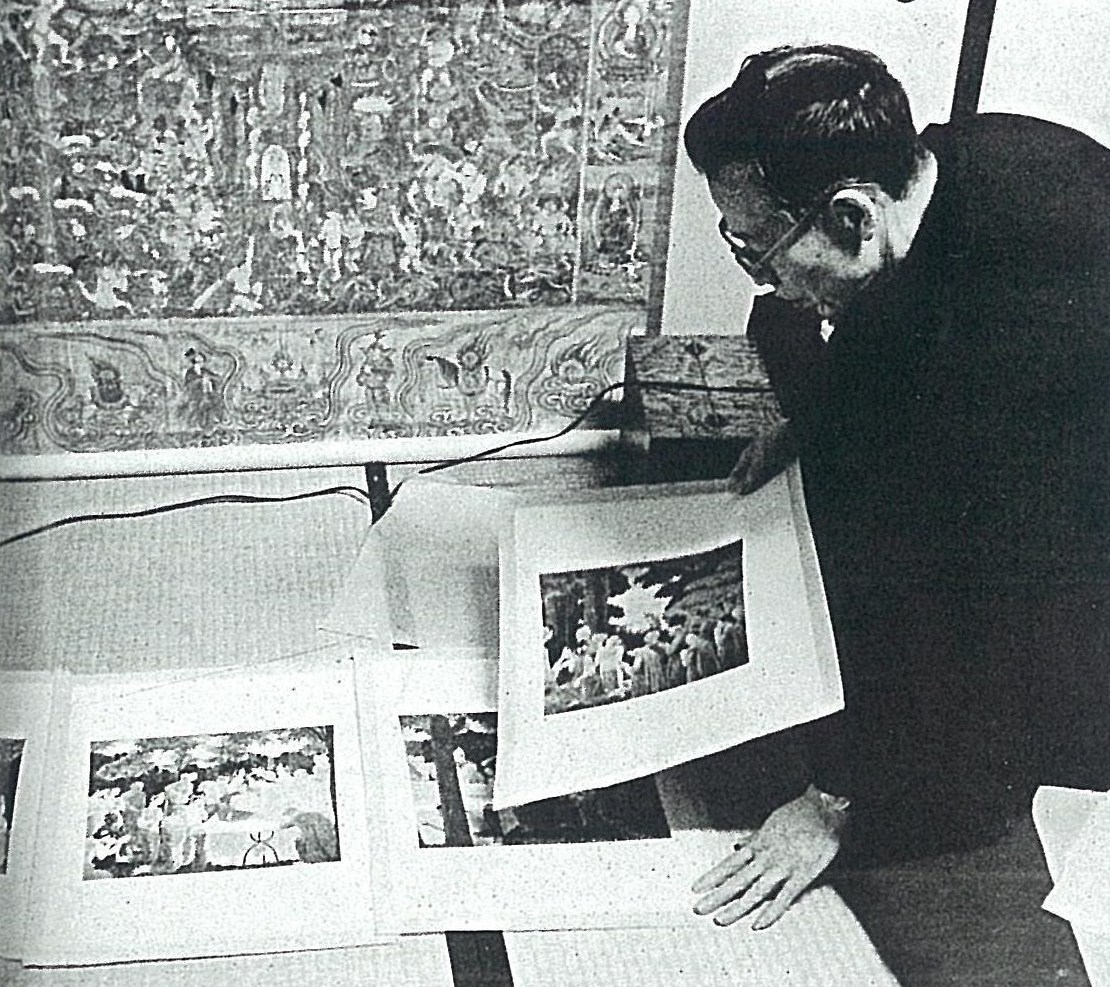
- Gakuryō Nakamura was a Japanese painter
- Born: 1890
- Died: 1969 (aged 78–79)
- Style: Nihonga

Gakuryō Nakamura (中村岳陵, Nakamura Gakuryō) (1890–1969) was a Japanese Nihonga painter and designer.

He received a commission to decorate the Hōmei-den state banquet hall of the Tokyo Imperial Palace. He designed the tapestry works for the decorations of the wall called “Toyohata-gumo (A Pretty Bank of Clouds)”. He was also commissioned to decorate the Ume-no-Ma audience room, a hall that has an area of 152 square meters or 46 tsubo. His “Kouhaku-bai” drawing is at the centre of the wall.

== See also ==
- Seison Maeda (1885–1977), one of the leading Nihonga painters
- List of Nihonga painters
