= Nippon Menard Cosmetic Co. =

Japanese company

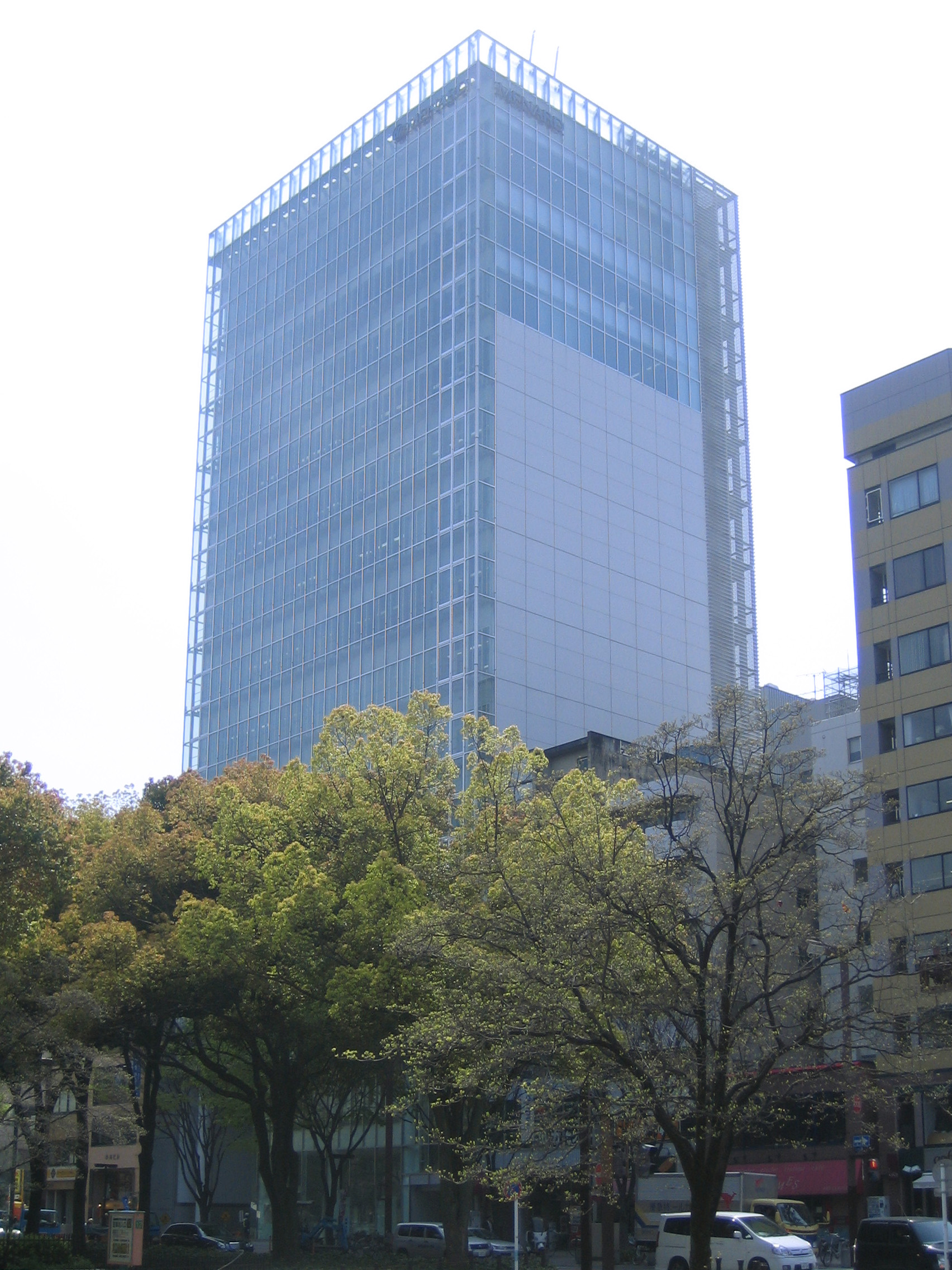
Nippon Menard Cosmetic headquarters in Nagoya

Nippon Menard Cosmetic Co., Ltd. is a cosmetics company and health foods manufacturer based in Nagoya, central Japan.

It was founded in November 1959 by Daisuke Nonogawa.

The name is derived from the Maenad, who were female followers of the Greek god Dionysos.

The owners of the company set up the Menard Art Museum in 1987 to house its art collection.
