= Tomohide Dote =

Japanese Nihonga painter (born 1944)

Tomohide Dote (土手朋英, Dote Tomohide) (born 1944) is a Japanese Nihonga painter.

He was born in Kyoto. In 1969 he graduated from the Japanese painting department of Kyoto Municipal College of Art and Design.

His paintings are mostly landscapes or flowers in the Nihonga school of style. He has also painted a number of sange, which are paper leaves in the shape of flower petals used in Buddhist ceremonies.

He has received multiple awards.

== See also ==
- Seison Maeda (1885–1977), one of the leading Nihonga painters
- List of Nihonga painters
