= Fumiko Hori =

Japanese painter (1918–2019)

- Born: July 2, 1918; Tokyo, Japan
- Died: February 5, 2019 (aged 100); Hiratsuka, Japan
- Style: Nihonga

Fumiko Hori (堀 文子, Hori Fumiko; July 2, 1918 – February 5, 2019) was a Japanese artist, known for her paintings in the Nihonga style.

== Biography ==
Hori was born to a scholarly family in Hirakawacho, in Tokyo, Japan, in 1918. In 1940, she graduated from Women's School of Fine Arts (now Joshibi University of Art and Design). She trained in Nihonga, a traditional Japanese painting style. In 1952, she won the Uemura Shōen Award, given to outstanding Japanese female painters.

In 1960, Hori's husband, a diplomat, died of tuberculosis. Hori decided to travel the world, leaving Japan for the first time and visiting Egypt, Europe, the United States and Mexico. Upon her return to Japan, she moved to the Kanagawa countryside and created works inspired by her travels. The natural world, including flowers and animals, was a theme of her work throughout her career.

From the 1950s to the 1970s, Hori created illustrations for magazines and children's books, including a 1971 picture book adaption of Tchaikovsky's The Nutcracker that won an award at the Bologna Children's Book Fair. She also taught painting at Tama Art University. In 1987, she won the Kanagawa Culture Prize.

Hori lived in Arezzo, in Tuscany, Italy, for five years from 1987, setting up a studio there and painting colourful images of the local setting. She continued to travel to countries around the world, including such destinations as the Amazon, Nepal, and Mexico.

In 2000, she survived life-threatening aneurysm; she was inspired by this experience to paint microorganisms, as viewed under a microscope. This work appeared in a solo exhibition at Nakajima Art Gallery in Ginza, Tokyo. A ceramic piece based on one of her paintings, Utopia, was installed in the lobby of Fukushima Airport in 2014.

Hori continued to paint into her final years. The Museum of Modern Art in Hayama showed a retrospective of her work from November 2017 to March 2018; the earliest piece was a self-portrait from 1930, and the most recent piece was Red-Flowering Japanese Apricot, painted in 2016 when Hori was 98 years old.

Hori died on February 5, 2019, at a hospital in Hiratsuka, Kanagawa Prefecture, at age 100. The Narukawa Art Museum in Hakone, home of over 100 of her works, hosted a memorial exhibition from July to November 2019.

== See also ==
- List of Nihonga painters
