= Aguri Uchida =

Japanese painter

Aguri Uchida (内田 あぐり, Uchida Aguri, born 1949) is a Japanese painter in the Nihonga style of watercolour painting.

== Biography ==
Uchida was born in 1949 in Tokyo. In 1975 she completed her studies in the university of Musashino art school; she exhibited twice in that year, being awarded a prize by the sougakai (創画会). After that, she mainly conducted sougakai activities. From 1993 she served at the teaching school at Musashino art school, and won first prize at the 12th Yamatane museum prize exhibition. In 2002 she won the Kaii Higashiyama memorial nikkei nihonga grand prize. She has given personal exhibitions in many places.

Her compositions are characterized by a bold form and colours which are each independent.

== Major works ==
- 地への廻廊 （1993）
- 吊された男―'00Ｍ（2000年）
