= Nippon Shinyaku =

Japanese pharmaceutical company

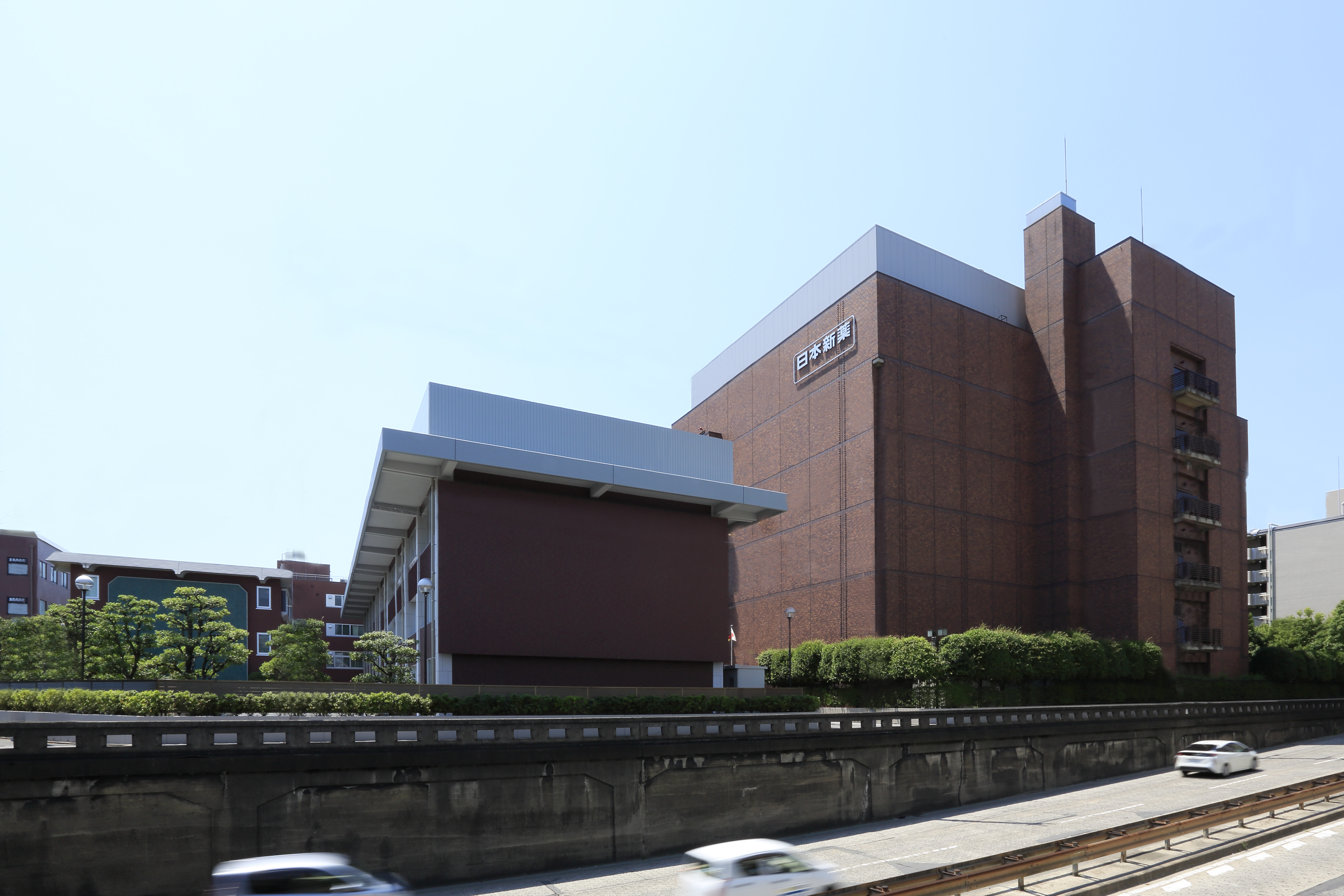
- Nippon Shinyaku Head Office Exterior - Nishioji Street
- Type: Public (K.K)
- Industry: Pharmaceuticals, Functional Foods
- Founded: October 1, 1919; 107 years ago in Kyoto, Japan
- Headquarters: Kyoto, Japan
- Area served: Worldwide
- Key people: Toru Nakai (President), Shigenobu Maekawa (Chairman), Takashi Takaya (Director), Kazuchika Takagaki (Director, Head R&D)
- Products: Prescription drugs, functional foods
- Number of employees: 2,243 (2025)
- Website: www.nippon-shinyaku.co.jp/english/

Nippon Shinyaku Co., Ltd. is a Japanese pharmaceutical company headquartered in Kyoto that markets prescription drugs and functional foods. Nippon Shinyaku has developed treatments such as viltolarsen for Duchenne muscular dystrophy.
