= Kaii Higashiyama =

Japanese artist (1908–1999)

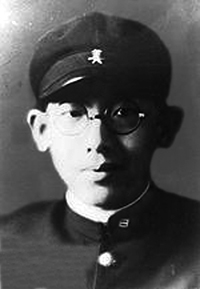
Kaii Higashiyama in his early years

Kaii Higashiyama (東山 魁夷, Higashiyama Kaii; July 8, 1908 – May 6, 1999) was a Japanese writer and artist particularly renowned for his Nihonga style paintings. As one of the most popular artists in post-war Japan, Higashiyama was awarded the Japan Art Academy Prize in 1956 and the Order of Culture in 1969.

== Biography ==
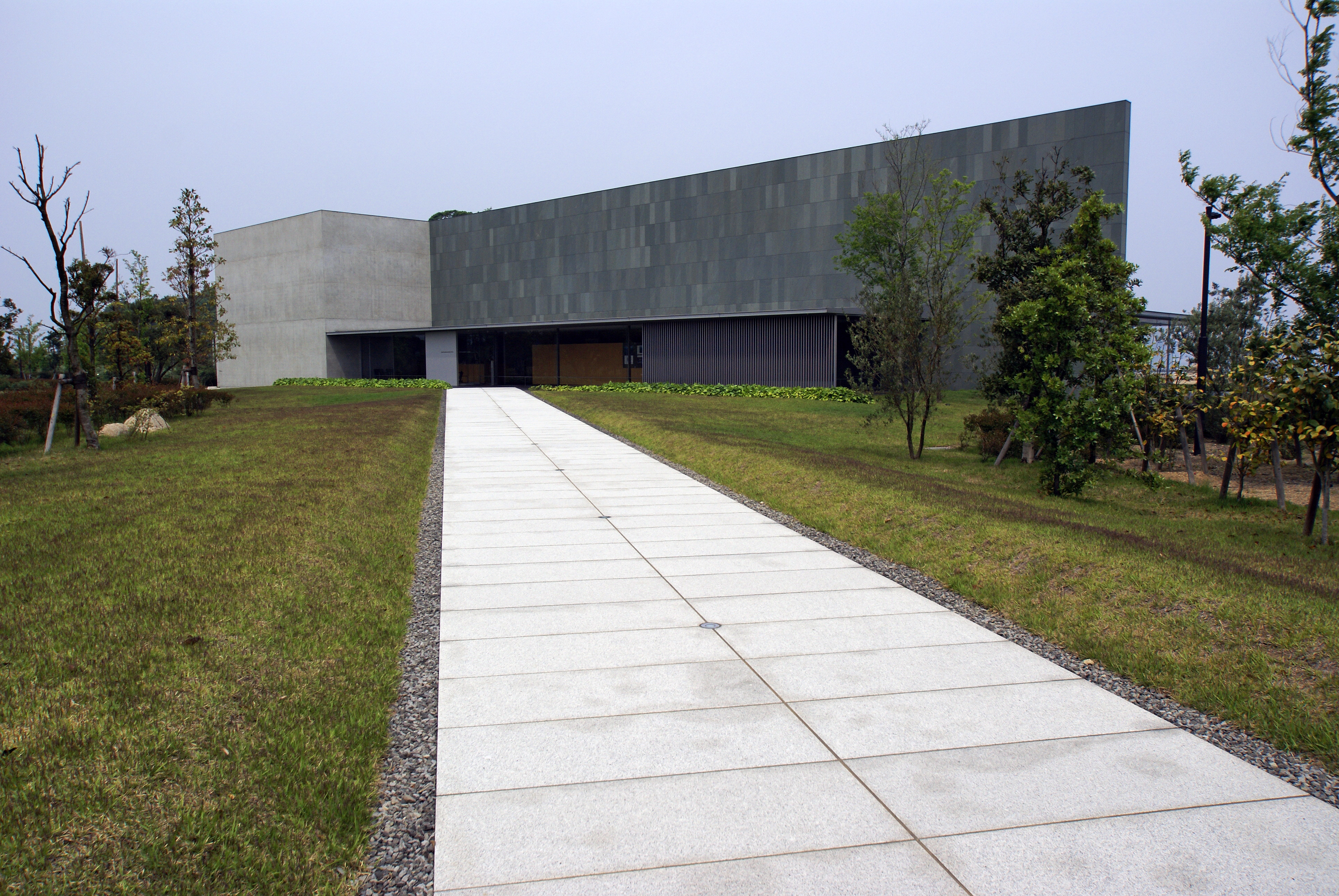
Kaii Higashiyama`s Art Museum in Sakaide, Kagawa

Born in Yokohama to parents Kosuke and Kuni, he was given the first name Shinkichi but later changed this to Kaii. From age three to 18 he lived in Kobe where he attended Kobe Junior High School (presently Hyogo Prefectural High School).

In 1921 he entered the Nihonga department of Tokyo School of Fine Arts (currently Tokyo National University of Fine Arts and Music). Higashiyama graduated with commendation in 1931 and entered the school's research department, where he spent two years training under Somei Yuki. In 1933, he boarded a cargo ship bound for Europe and began his studies in Western art history at Berlin University, where he studied from 1933 to 1935. At this time his work entered an art competition during the 1936 Summer Olympics in Berlin.

On November 21, 1940 he married Sumi Kawasaki, the eldest daughter of painter Sumi Kawasaki, and moved to Saginomiya in Tokyo. In July 1945, he was drafted into the army and received anti-tank training and was demobilized later that year. He spent a lot of time travelling, mostly in Japan and China, but also made several trips to Europe. In 1962 he travelled around the Nordic countries.

In 1947, he received the special prize at Nitten, the largest competition art exhibition in Japan. This fueled the development of his own style focusing on confrontation and contemplation of nature. In 1950, he exhibited the painting "Road" at the 6th Nitten Exhibition, where his sympathetic and simplistic treatment of the subject matter was well received by the art world and the public alike. In 1950, after the death of his mother, he moved to Ichikawa, Chiba.

He traveled to Scandinavian countries, Germany, Austria, and China, and drew many works themed the sceneries of these countries. On January 12, 1985, Higashiyama together with Andy Warhol and Joseph Beuys participated in the "Global-Art-Fusion" project. This was a Fax art project, initiated by the conceptual artist Ueli Fuchser, in which a fax was sent with drawings of all three artists within 32 minutes around the world—from Düsseldorf (Germany) via New York (USA) to Tokyo (Japan), received at Vienna's Palais-Liechtenstein Museum of Modern Art. It was meant as a statement for peace during the Cold War in the 1980s.

=== Murals ===
In 1953, he was selected to paint 27 fusama-e murals for a Japanese house, called Shofuso Japanese House and Gardens, which was being constructed in Nagoya in 1953 for an exhibition at the Museum of Modern Art in New York. Higashiyama, who had been a classmate of architect Junzo Yoshimura, was chosen above a number of other well-known Japanese painters such as Maeda Seison and Yokoyama Taikan, to paint mountain scenes with black ink on the fusuma and the tokonoma alcove. The Shofuso was moved to Philadelphia in 1958 where the murals were on view until they were destroyed by vandals in 1974.

In 1960, he painted a large mural entitled "Sun, Moon, and The Four Seasons", for the state dining room the Tōgū Palace of the Crown Prince. A second imperial commission followed, resulting in the 1968 mural, "Tide at Daybreak" (Asaake no Ushio), which is part of the Nami-no-ma hall of Tokyo Imperial Palace. This large painting is apparently modeled on the rocks of the Oumi Island in Yamaguchi prefecture. The dimensions of the painting are approximately 3.8 meters in height and about 14.3 meters horizontally.

He also painted several murals of Japanese and Chinese landscapes, for the Tōshōdai-ji temple, completed in 1975 and 1980.

== Honors ==
- 1950 Appointed as a member of the Nitten Exhibition Jury.
- 1956 Received the Japan Art Academy Award for "Twilight”.
- 1965 Appointed as a member of Japan Art Academy, and accepted the post of Shin-Nitten Exhibition director.
- 1968 Appointed as a member of the Specialist Committee of the Council for the Protection of Foreign Treasures.
- 1969 Awarded the Mainichi Art Award for "Tide at Daybreak".
- 1969 Awarded the Order of Cultural Merit and commended as a Person of Cultural Merit.
- 1974 Became Chairman of the Board at Kaiso-Nitten.
- 1975 Commissioned by the Emperor to paint "Spring Daybreak" as a state gift to Queen Elizabeth II.
- 1984 Selected to join as a member of the Federal Republic of Germany's Pour le Mérite für Wissenschaften und Künste.
- 1992 Awarded the UNESCO Picasso Gold Medal.
- 1990 Higashiyama Kaii Gallery was opened in Nagano Prefectural Shinano Art Museum.
- 1994 Higashiyama Kaii Art Gallery was opened in Ichikawa City Life Learning Center.
- 2005 Sakaide Kagawa Prefectural Higashiyama Kaii Setouchi Art Museum was opened.

== Representative Works ==
- 1. "Zanshō" (Afterglow) - 1947, Collection of the Tokyo National Museum of Modern Art
- 2. "Michi" (The Way) - 1950, Collection of the Tokyo National Museum of Modern Art
- 3. "Kōkon" (Twilight) - 1955, Collection of the Japan Art Academy
- 4. "Seikyō" (Blue Echo) - 1960, Collection of the Tokyo National Museum of Modern Art
- 5. "Byakuya" (White Night) - 1963, Collection of the Kitazawa Museum of Art
- 6. "Akebono" (Dawn) - 1968, Collection of the Kitazawa Museum of Art
- 7. "Toshikururu" (Passing Year) - 1968, Collection of the Yamane Art Museum
- 8. "Hanaakari" (Flower Light) - 1968, Private Collection
- 9. "Hakuba no Mori" (White Horse Forest) - 1972, Collection of the Nagano Prefectural Museum of Art
- 10. "Midorihibiku" (Resonating Green) - 1972, Collection of the Nagano Prefectural Museum of Art (Depicting Lake Misakaike)
- 11. "Tōsei," "Yama Kumo," "Kōzan Gyōkun" - 1975, Murals at Tōshōdai-ji Temple
- 12. "Asaake no Ushio" (Morning Tide) - 1968, Murals at the Imperial Palace New Palace
- 13. "Yūsei" (Evening Star) - 1999, Collection of the Nagano Prefectural Museum of Art (Final Work)
- 14. "Shunsetsu" (Spring Snow) - Woodcut, 1986
- 15. "Akusai" (Autumn Thoughts) - Lithograph, 1991
- 16. "Shūshō" (Autumn Evening) - Lithograph, 1998, Published by the Nihon Keizai Shimbun Company

== See also ==
- Yasushi Sugiyama
- Togyū Okumura
- Maeda Seison
- List of Nihonga painters

== Sources ==
- "Kaii Higashiyama: A retrospective". Nikkei inc. Archived from the original on 2008-08-08.
- "Kaii Higashiyama- The Japanese master". James Tan Gallery. Archived from the original on 2008-08-19.
- "Kaii Higashiyama biography". Higashiyama Kaii Setouchi Museum. Archived from the original on 2008-06-17.
- The collected works of Kaii Higashiyama. Shorewood Fine Art Books. OCLC 78302874.
- Yasunari Kawabata. Collection of Higashiyama-Kaii's Major Paintings. Tokyo: Shueisha Co.
