= Kagaku Murakami =

Japanese painter and illustrator

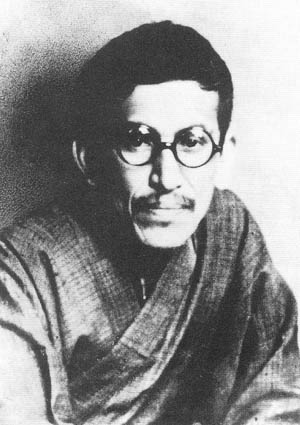
- Murakami Kagaku
- Born: Takeda Shinichi; July 3, 1888; Osaka, Japan
- Died: November 11, 1939 (aged 51); Hanakuma, Kobe, Hyogo, Japan
- Education: Kyoto Kaiga Senmon Gakko (present day Kyoto City University of Arts)
- Known for: Painter
- Movement: Nihonga; the Society for the Creation of a National Painting Style (国画創作協会 Kokuga Sosaku Kyokai)
- Patrons: Seibe Naiki, founder of Nippon Shinyaku Co., Ltd. (See Ramatroban)

Kagaku Murakami (村上 華岳, Murakami Kagaku; July 3, 1888 – November 11, 1939) was a Japanese painter and illustrator, noted for his numerous Buddhist subjects and advancement in the techniques of nihonga (Japanese-style) painting in the early 20th century.

== Biography ==
He was born in Osaka as Takeda Shinichi. His parents divorced when he was a child and he was raised in Kobe, taking his maternal grandfather's name in 1904. In 1903, he entered the Kyoto City School of Arts and Crafts, graduating in 1907 and entering the Kyoto City Art College (present day Kyoto City University of Arts) in 1909, from which he graduated in 1913. His work was accepted for display at the 5th Bunten Exhibition in 1911, and in 1916, he won a special prize for his first Buddhist-themed work at the 10th Bunten Exhibition. The same year, he moved into Kodai-ji temple in Kyoto as a lay monk. In 1918, he created the Society for the Creation of a National Painting Style (国画創作協会, Kokuga Sosaku Kyokai) with Tsuchida Bakusen and three other young nihonga artists from the Kyoto area.

The aim of the group was to revitalize what they perceived to be stagnation in the nihonga techniques through a fusion of Yamato-e, early ukiyo-e and the Shijō school's use of delicate lines with the techniques and tenets of western art, while maintaining the use of subjects traditional to Japanese art. The society held its own exhibitions (Kokuten), and at the second of these in 1919, Murakami displayed Kiyohime Crossing the Hidaka River, which is regarded as one of his representative works. The painting is now recognized by the Japanese government's Agency for Cultural Affairs as an Important Cultural Property.

In 1920, at the 3rd Kokuten Exhibition, Murakami displayed a nude portrait, in a style reminiscent of Indian painting. It is uncertain if the subject is a bodhisattva or a woman, and likewise the style of the work transcends both nihonga and yōga. However, the work remained highly controversial during his lifetime, and lead to his gradual estraignment from the mainstream art world. In 1923, due to the worsening of his chronic asthma, Murakami left Kyoto for Ashiya, Hyōgo. He continued to paint on religious themes. In 1927, he returned to live in Kobe. In Murakami's final years, as his health continued to worsen, his paintings became smaller and smaller, and his use of color fainter and fainter, until his final works were almost monochromatic. He died in 1939.

== Noted works ==
- Night Cherry Blossoms (夜桜之図, Yozakura-zu), 1913, Kyoto Museum of Modern Art
- Kiyohime Crossing the Hidaka River (日高河清姫図, Hidakagawa Kiyohime-zu), 1919, Tokyo Museum of Modern Art, National Important Cultural Property
- Nude (裸婦図, Rafu-zu), 1920, Yamatane Art Museum

Nude
- 裸婦図 (Japanese)
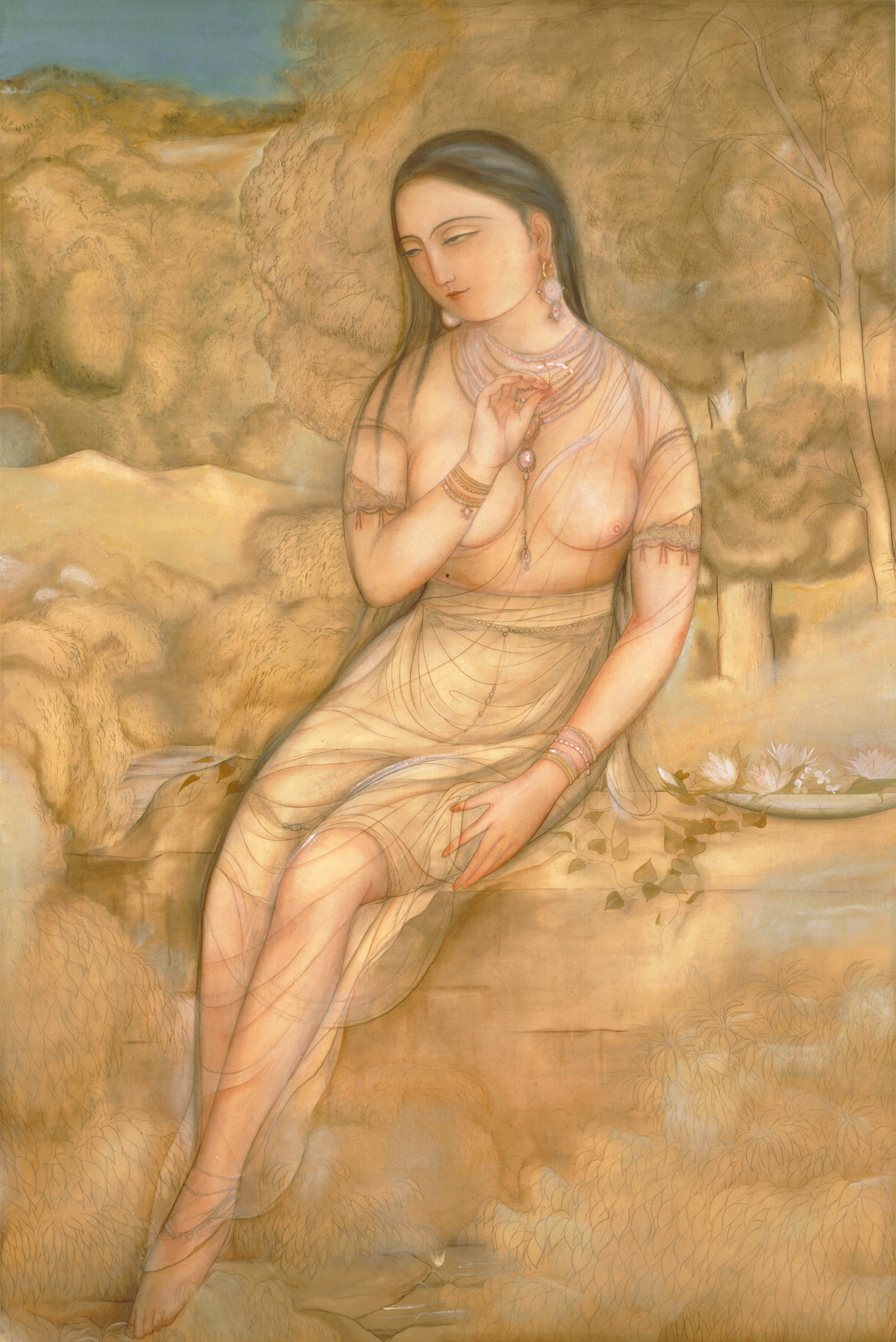
- Artist: Kagaku Murakami
- Year: 1920
- Type: Oil painting
- Dimensions: 163.6 cm × 109.1 cm (64.4 in × 43.0 in)
- Location: Yamatane Art Museum, Tokyo

== Patronage ==
The works od Kagaku Murakami were and are loved by many art collectors. One of the well-known patrons was Seibe Naiki, founder of Nippon Shinyaku Co., Ltd., called one of Kyoto Shitenno (Big Four). See Nishiōji Station, Yamashina Botanical Research Institute to know Nippon Shinyaku.

== Gallery ==
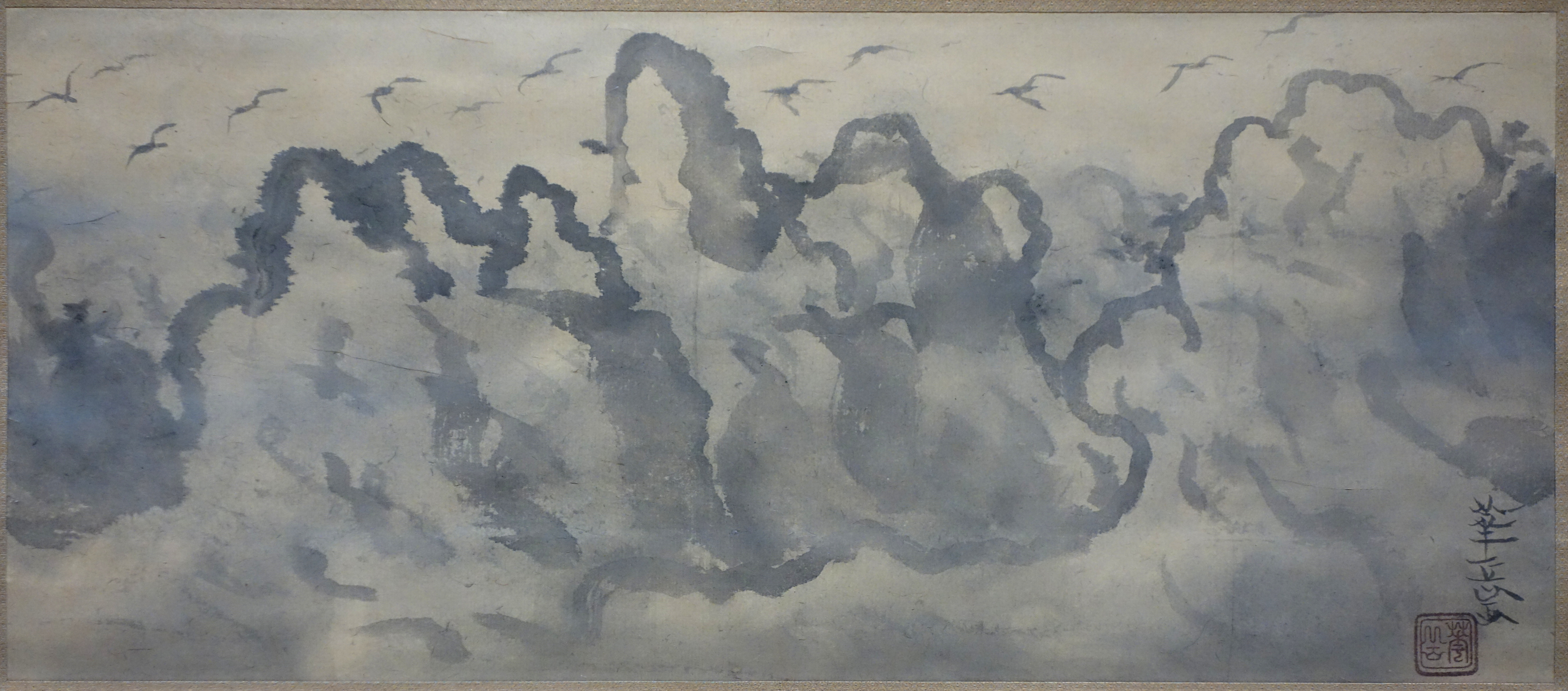
Sunset Landscape with Birds, by Kagaku Murakami, 1935, sumi on paper

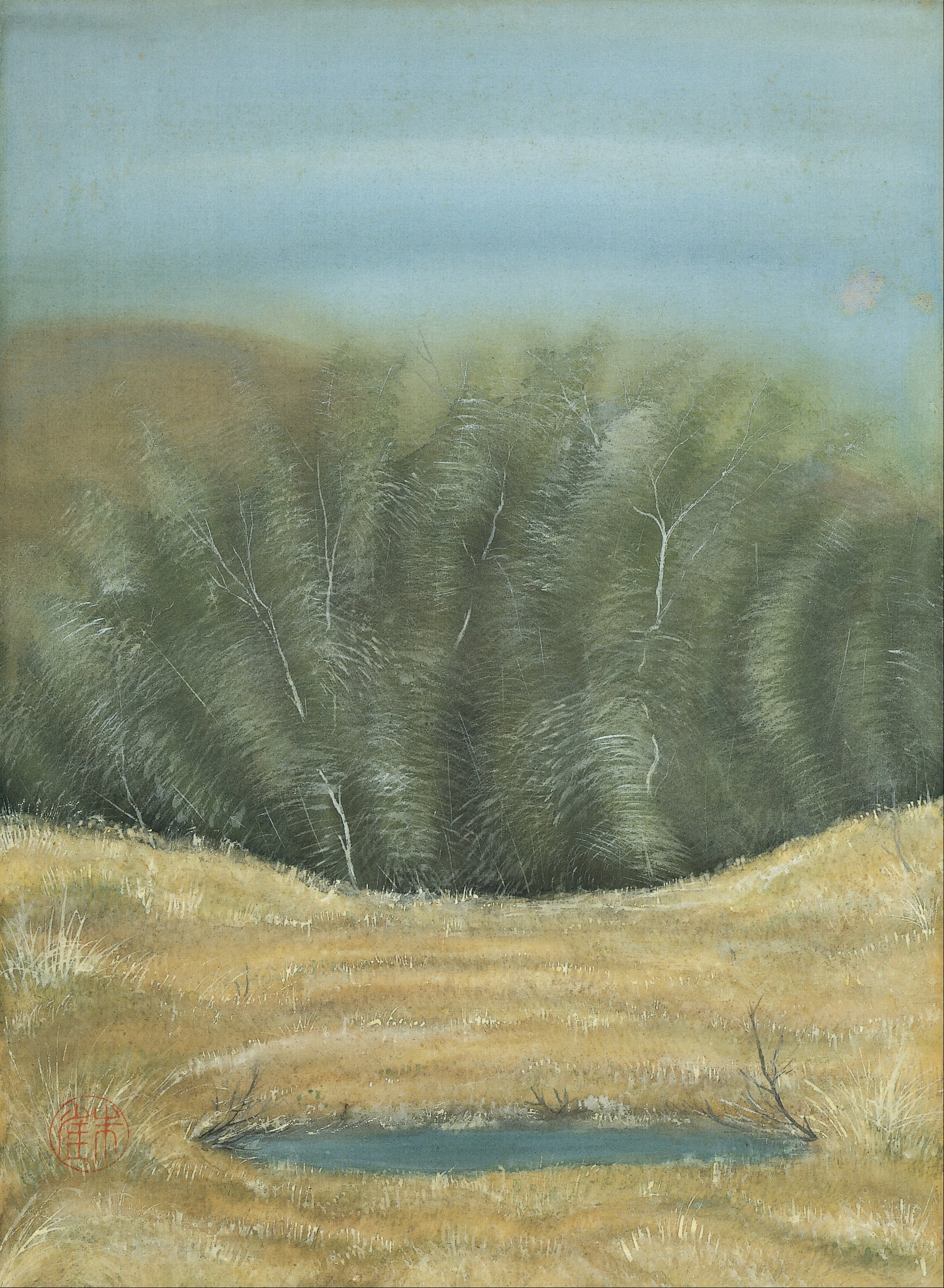
Autumnal Scenery

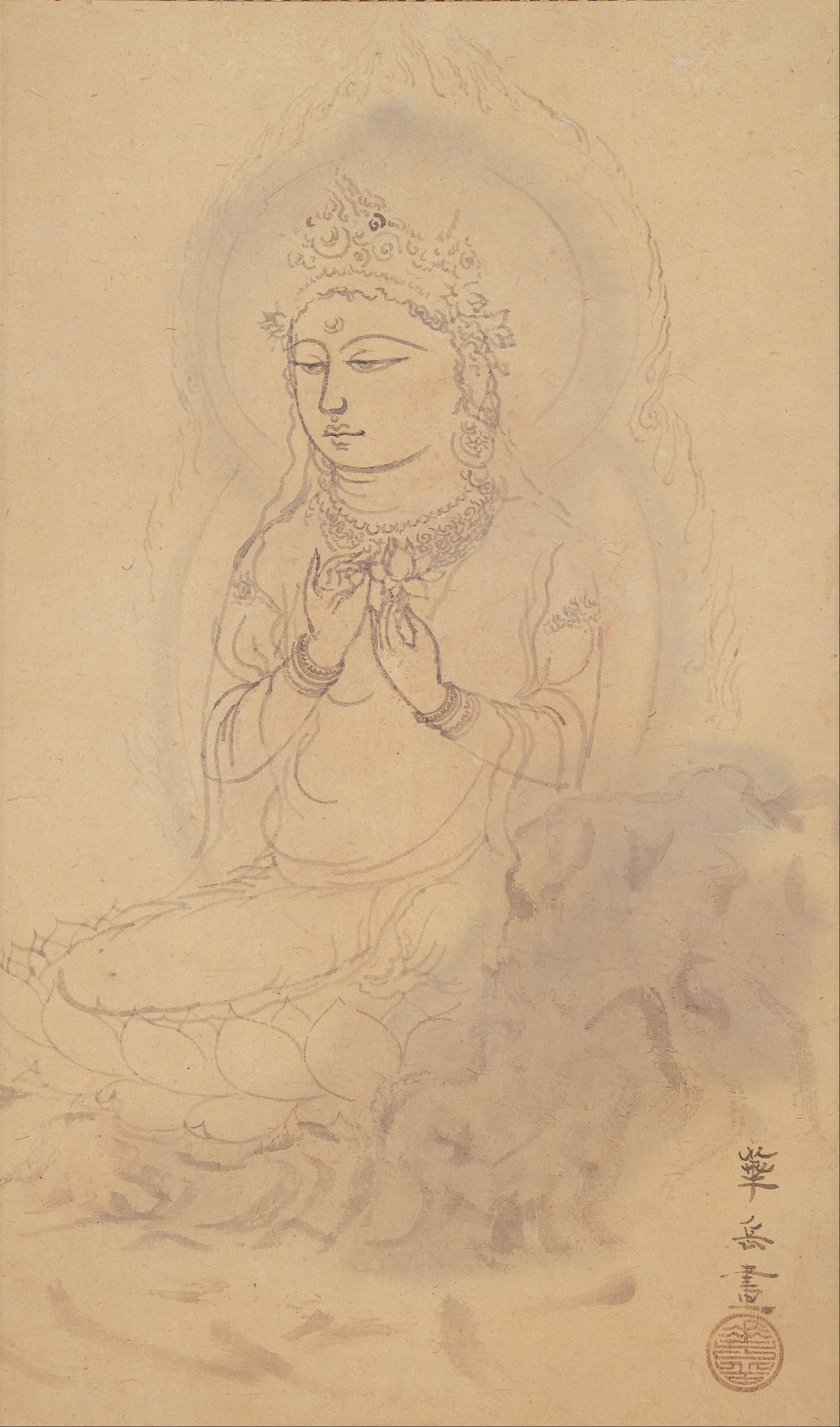
Seated Avalokiteshvara with Lotus

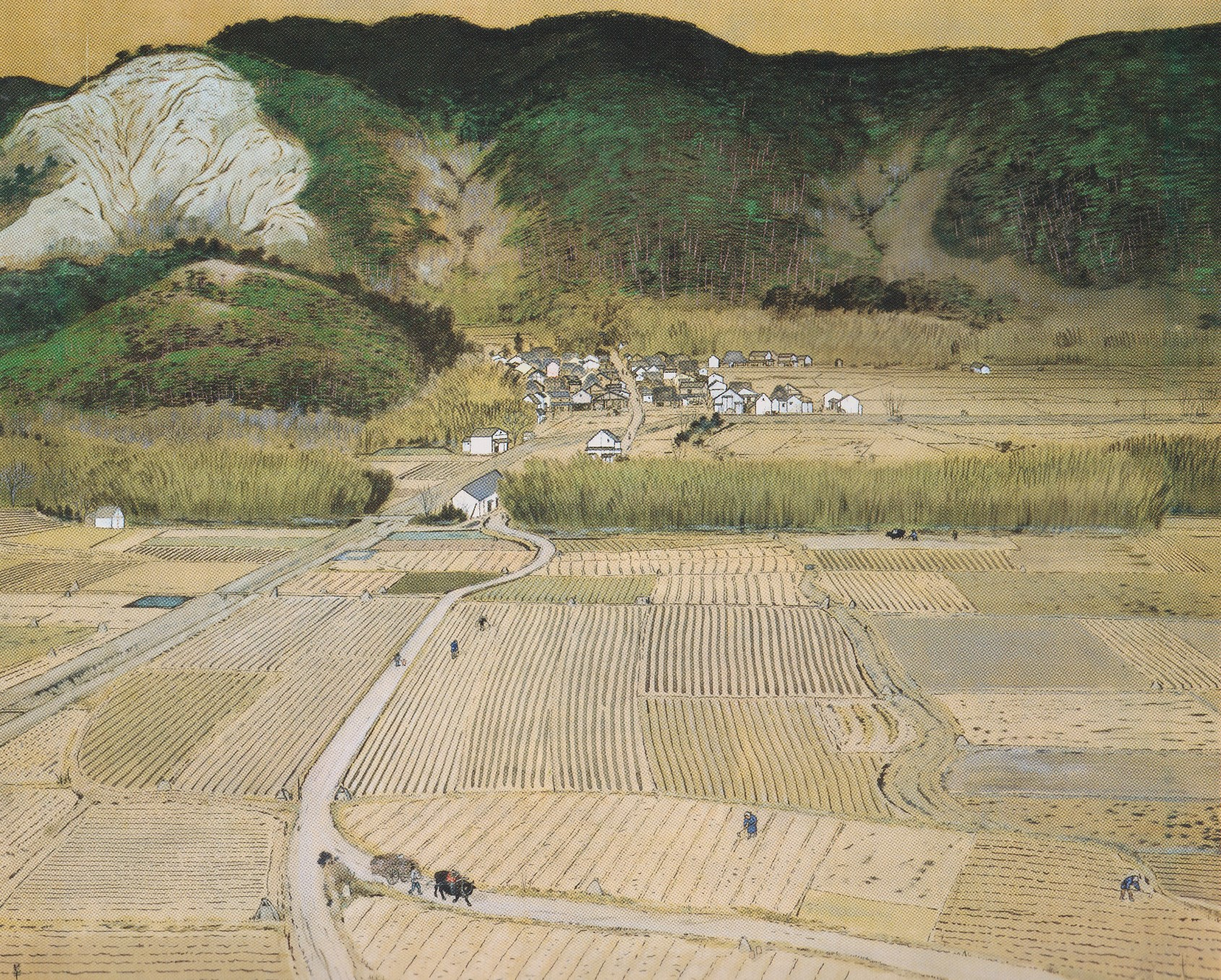
Landscape in February

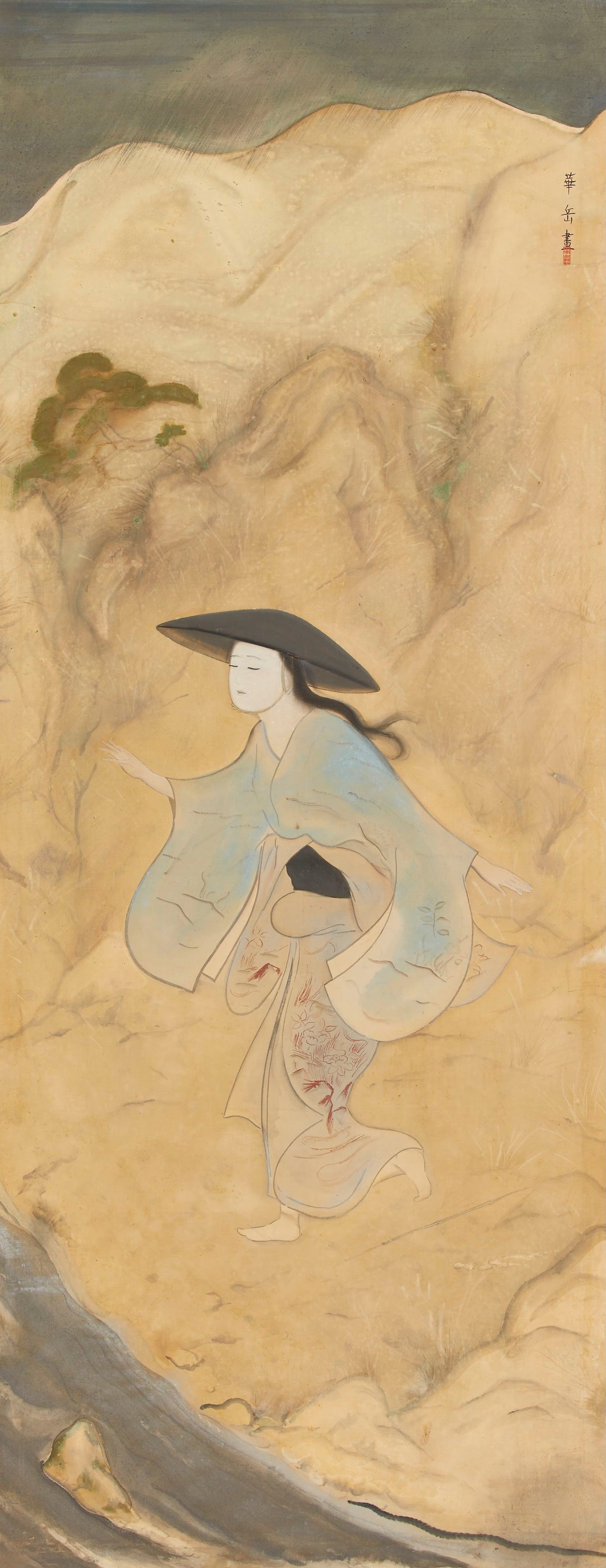
Kiyohime at the Hidaka River

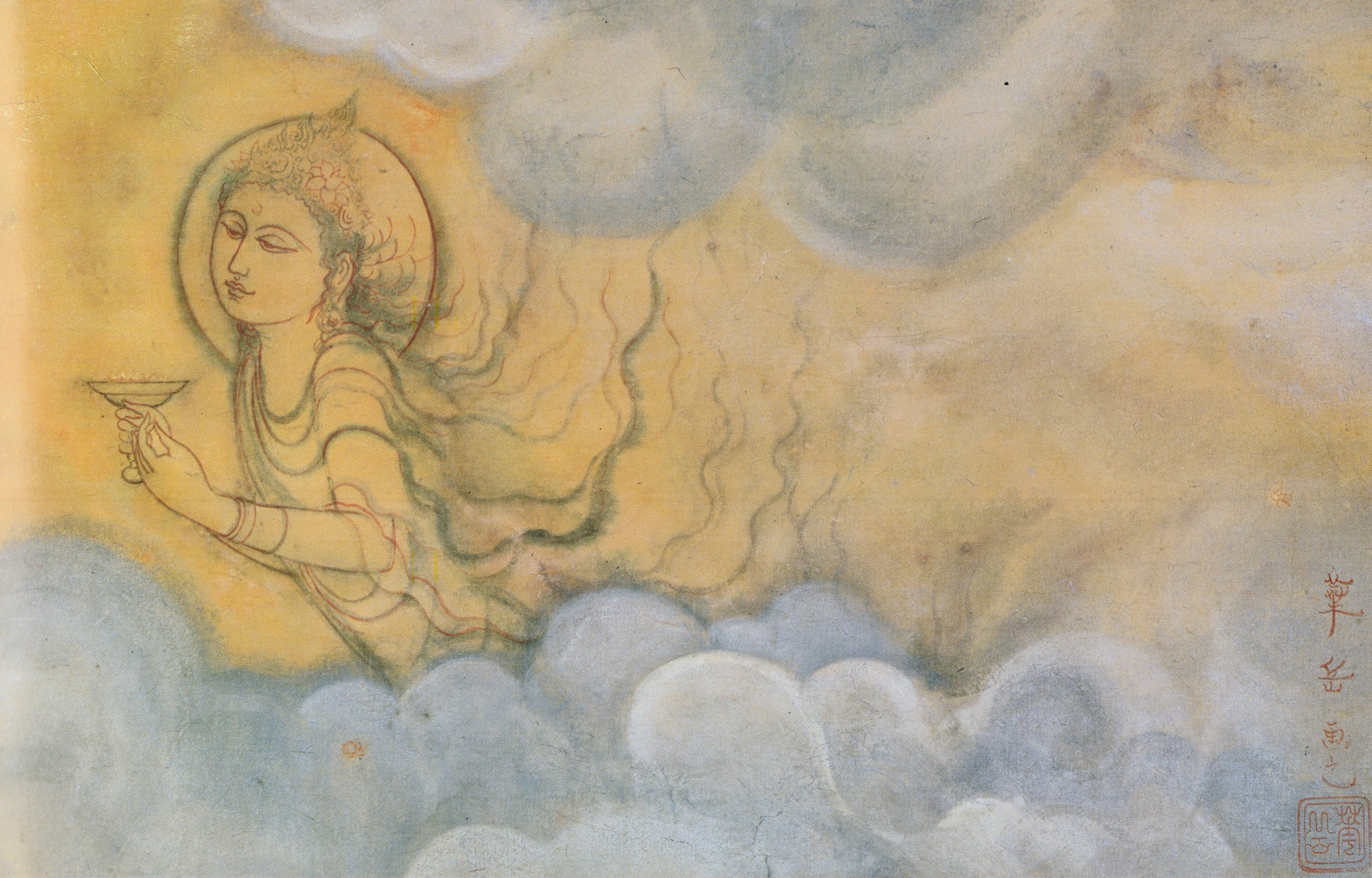
Above clouds

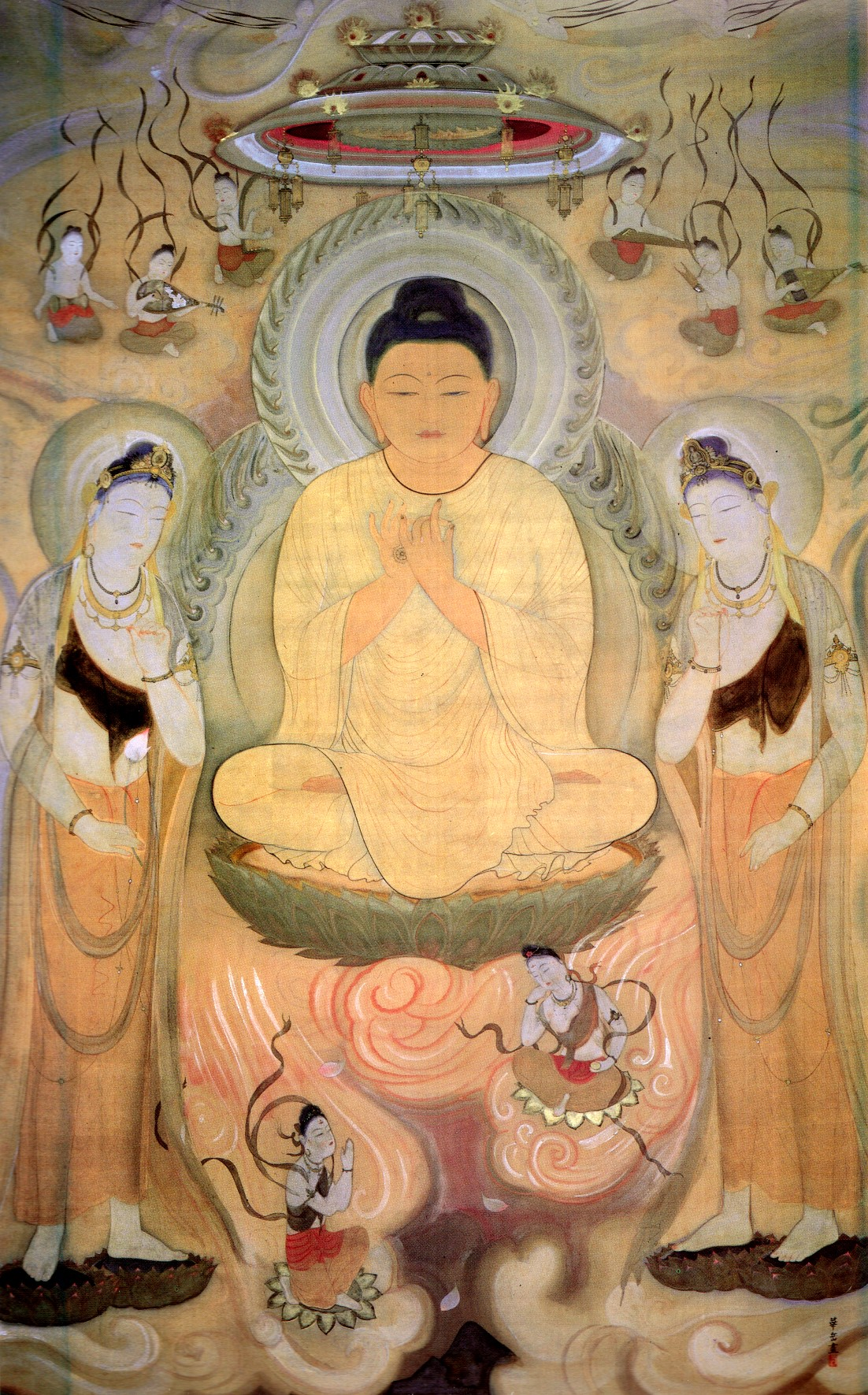
Amidha
