= Super Aguri (disambiguation) =

Super Aguri may refer to a number of motor racing teams associated with former racing driver Aguri Suzuki:

- Super Aguri F1, a Formula One team
- Super Aguri (Formula E team), a Formula E team
- Super Aguri Fernandez Racing, an IndyCar team
- Funai Super Aguri, a former Formula Nippon team
