= Yukihiko Yasuda =

Japanese painter (1884–1978)

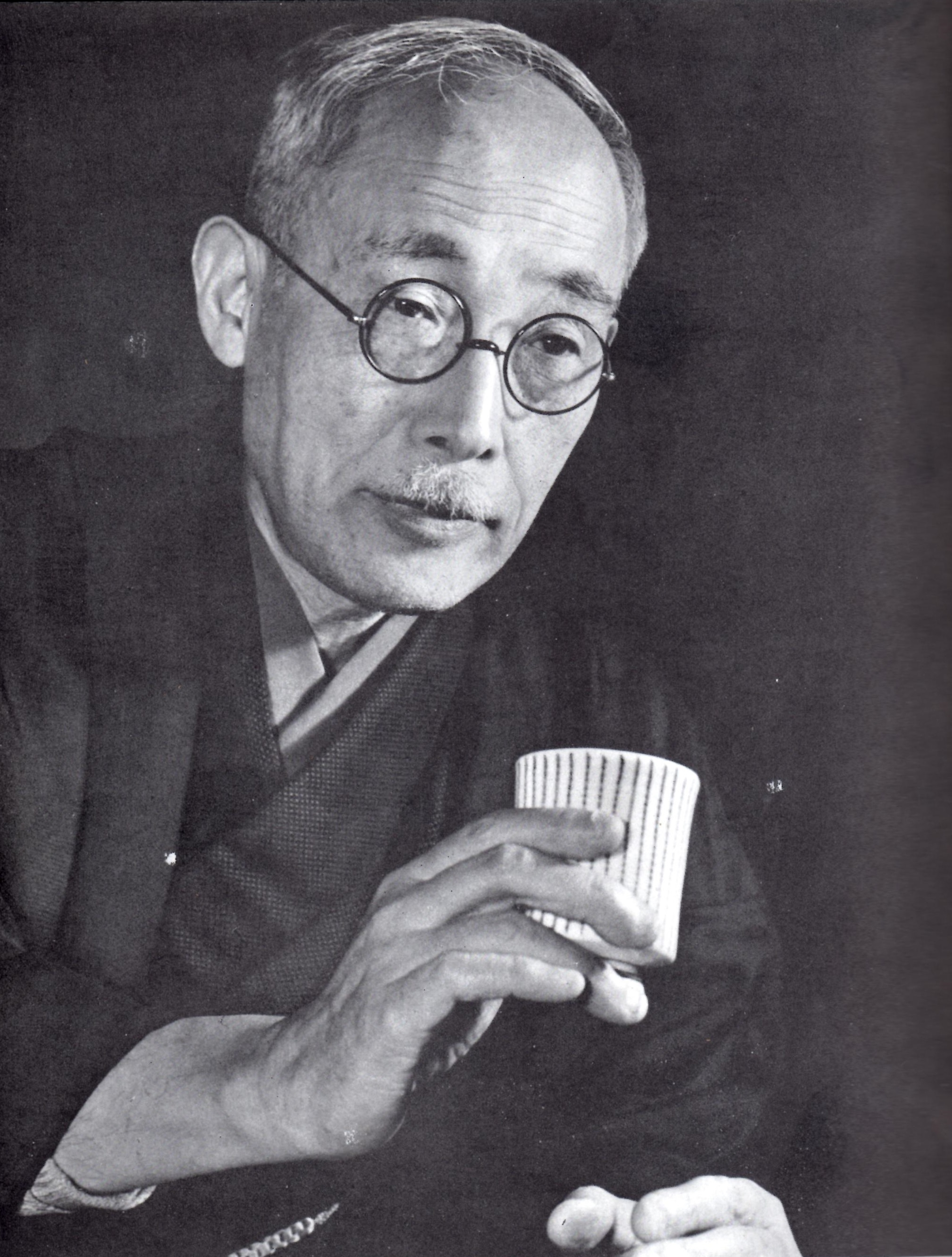
- Yasuda photographed by Shigeru Tamura, 1953
- Born: Shinzaburō Yasuda; 16 February 1884; Nihonbashi, Tokyo, Japan
- Died: 29 April 1978 (aged 94); Ōiso, Kanagawa, Japan
- Education: Kobori, Tomoto
- Known for: Painter
- Movement: Nihonga
- Awards: Asahi Shinbun Cultural Award (1941), Order of Culture (1948)

Yukihiko Yasuda (安田 靫彦, Yasuda Yukihiko; 16 February 1884 – 29 April 1978) was the pseudonym of a major figure in Taishō and early Shōwa period Japanese painting, and is regarded as one of the founders of the Japanese painting technique of nihonga. His real name was Yasuda Shinzaburō.

== Biography ==
He was born in Nihonbashi, Tokyo, as the fourth son of a Japanese restaurant owner. He initially studied Tosa school painting at the Tōkyō Bijutsu Gakkō (the predecessor to the Tokyo National University of Fine Arts and Music), under Kobori Tomoto. While in school, his talent was recognized by Okakura Kakuzō who sent him to Nara to study classical paintings in the Yamato-e style. While in Nara, he first viewed the ancient murals on the walls of the Kondo chapel of the Buddhist temple of Hōryū-ji, and this was to have a deep impact on his future style of painting. He founded the Kojikai in 1901 with several other young artists.

From 1914, Yasuda assisted Yokoyama Taikan in re-establishing the Japan Fine Arts Academy (Nihon Bijutsuin). From 1944 to 1951, he taught as a professor at the Tokyo National University of Fine Arts and Music. In 1948, he was awarded the Order of Culture by the Japanese government, and was appointed a member of the Japan Art Academy. In the post-war period, he assisted Maeda Seison on restoration and preservation work on the murals of Hōryū-ji.

Yasuda was known primarily for his paintings on historical themes, and occasionally for portraiture or bird-and-flower paintings. One of his principal disciples was noted Nihonga painter Yuki Ogura.

== Important works ==
Yasuda's works have been selected as the subject of commemorative postage stamps three times by the Japanese post office:

- 1981: Spring in Asuka with Nukada Okimi, as part of the Modern Art series.
- 1986: Mount Fuji, to commemorate the 1986 Tokyo Summit
- 1996: Window, to commemorate the 1996 Philatelic Week

1940-1941：Camp at Kisegawa, is a set of six-panel folding painting in the color on paper, held in the collection of the National Museum of Modern Art, Tokyo. This artwork designated as an Important Cultural Property of Japan in 2011.

== Wartime Art ==
- In 1940, Yasuda Yukihiko created The Arrival of Yoshitsune and exhibited it at art exhibition commemorating the 2600th anniversary of the Japanese Imperial Era.
- In 1941, he completed another floding screen depicting Minamoto no Yoritomo.These two artworks consist Camp at Kisegawa.
- This work employs traditional Japanese painting techniques, incorporates rich symbols of traditional Japanese culture, and simultaneously displays modernist visual characteristics.
