= Togyū Okumura =

Japanese Nihonga painter

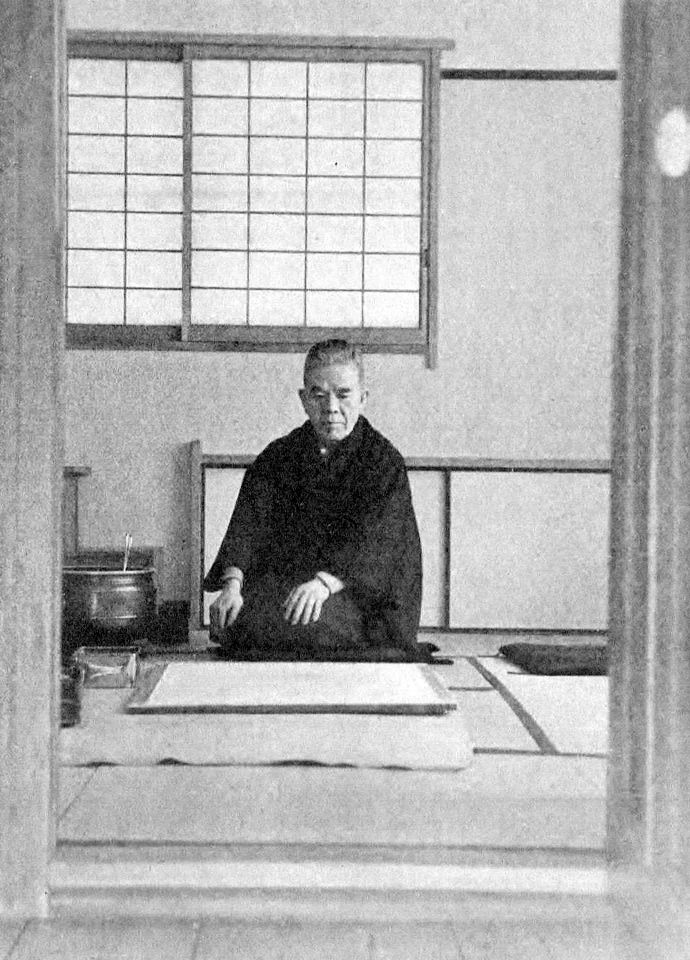
Togyü Okumura while working.

Togyū Okumura (奥村 土牛, Okumura Togyū; 18 February 1889 – 25 September 1990) was a famous Japanese modern painter of the Nihonga style of watercolour painting. His original name was Yoshizō (義三). The name Togyū referred to a poem from his father, who ran a publishing business.

Okumura is characterized by his works, which achieve an unusual, exquisite quality of colours through the application of the white gofun pigment 100 or 200 times as a foundation.

== Biography ==
- 1889 Born in Kyōbashi, Tokyo.
- 1900 Completes shogakko (junior school).
- 1926 Makes the acquaintance of Hayami Gyoshu.
- 1959 Becomes a director of the Japanese fine arts institute.
- 1962 Awarded the Japanese Order of Culture.
- 1978 Appointed chief director of the Japanese fine arts institute.
- 1990 Dies aged 101.

== Major works ==
He painted Mount Fuji, which is in the Tokyo Imperial Palace.

- 鳴門 (1959, 128.5×160.5 cm)
- 鹿 (1968, 114.7×145.0 cm)
- 醍醐 (1972, 135.5×115.8 cm)
- 閑日 (1974, 73.0×100.0 cm)
- 吉野 (1977, 108.6×184.4 cm)
- 富士宮の富士 (1982, 76.1×115.1 cm)
- 蠣 (1984, 102.0×131.0 cm)
- 寅 (1985, 16.2×49.5 cm)

== Books and collections of work ==
- スケッチそのをりをり (collection of sketches, 1917)
- 牛のあゆみ (autobiography, 1974)

== Major collections holding works by Okumura ==
- Okumura Togyu Memorial Museum (Nagano prefecture)
- Yamatane Museum

== See also ==
- Kaii Higashiyama
- Seison Maeda
