= Kokei Kobayashi =

Japanese Nihonga painter

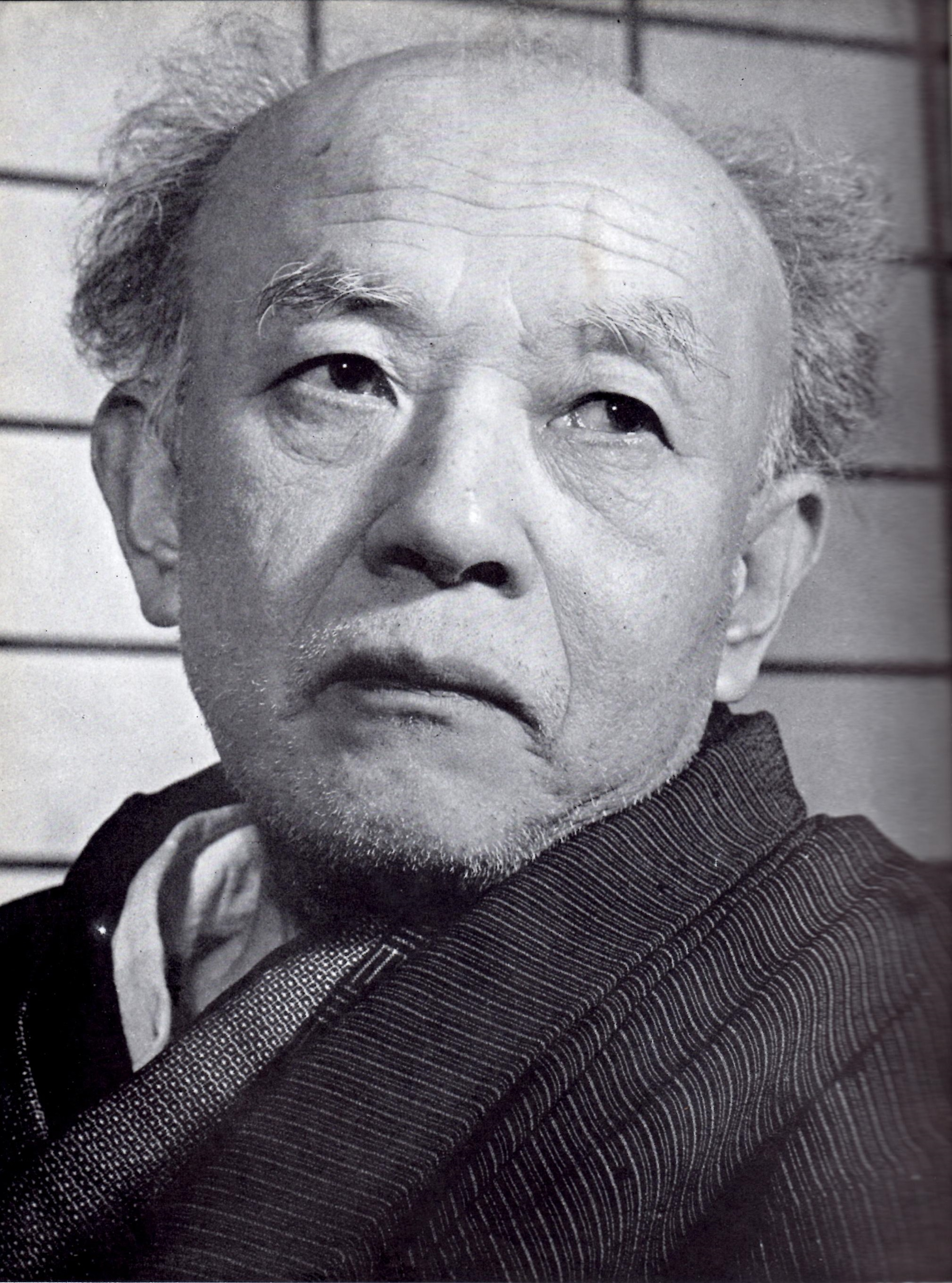
- circa 1953
- Born: Shigeru Kobayashi; February 11, 1883; Takada, Niigata Prefecture, Japan
- Died: April 3, 1957 (aged 74)
- Education: Kajita, Hanko
- Known for: Painter
- Movement: Nihonga
- Awards: Order of Culture(1950), Person of Cultural Merit(1951)

Kokei Kobayashi (小林古径, Kobayashi Kokei; February 11, 1883 – March 3, 1957) was a Japanese Nihonga painter.

== Biography ==
He became an orphan early in his life, at the age of 17 he moved to Tokyo and studied traditional Japanese painting at Kajita Hanko. Later he became one of the most notable members in the Restored Japan Academy of Art.

Initially, he painted traditional subject matter ("Taketori monogatari"-1914 as an example) but later he continued with still life and contemporary scenes. His famous works include: "Amida-dō" (1914), "Ideyu" (1918) and "Kami" (1931).

He was friends with Tamako Kataoka (1905–2008).

He was awarded the Order of Culture.

== Works ==
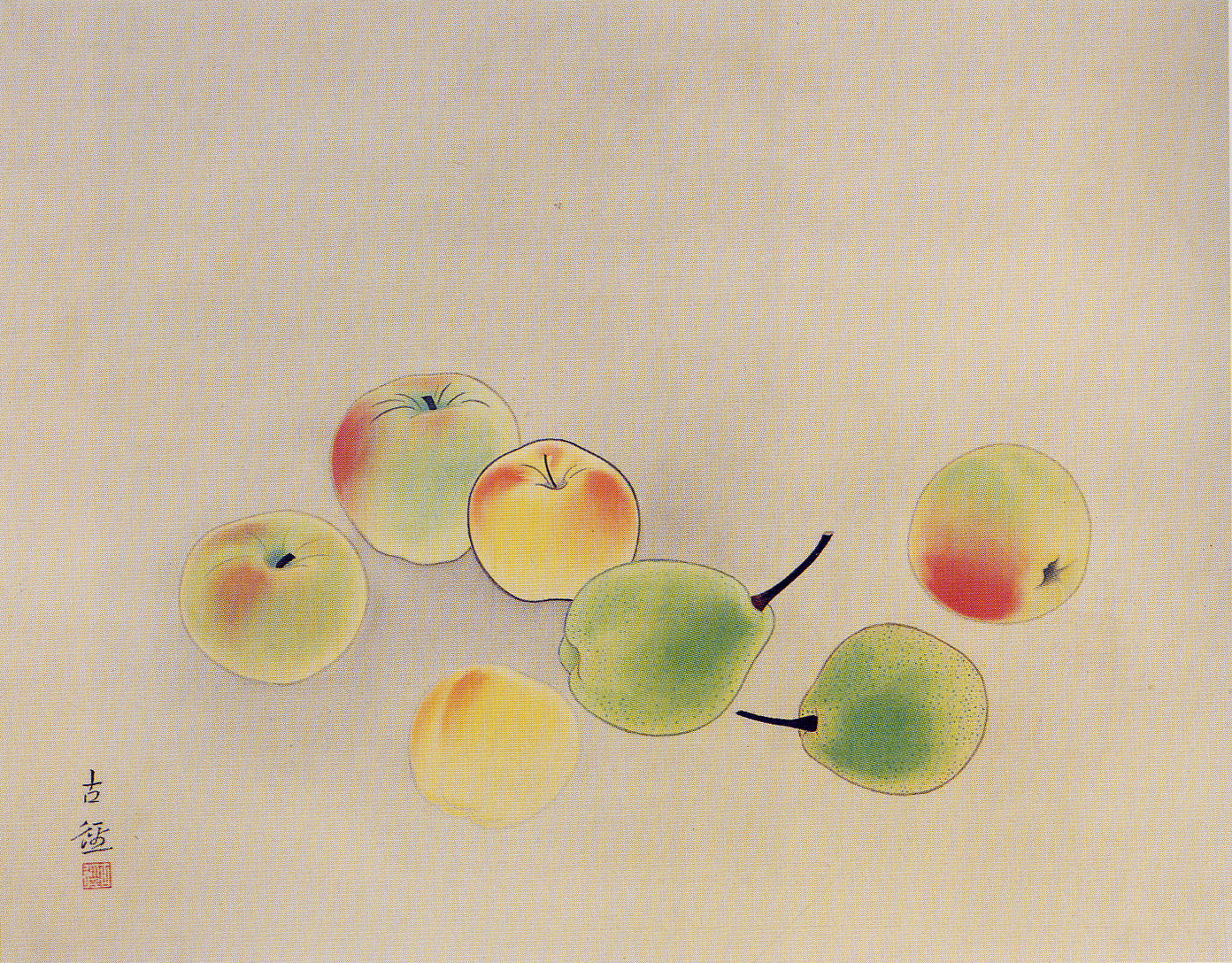
Fruit (1910)

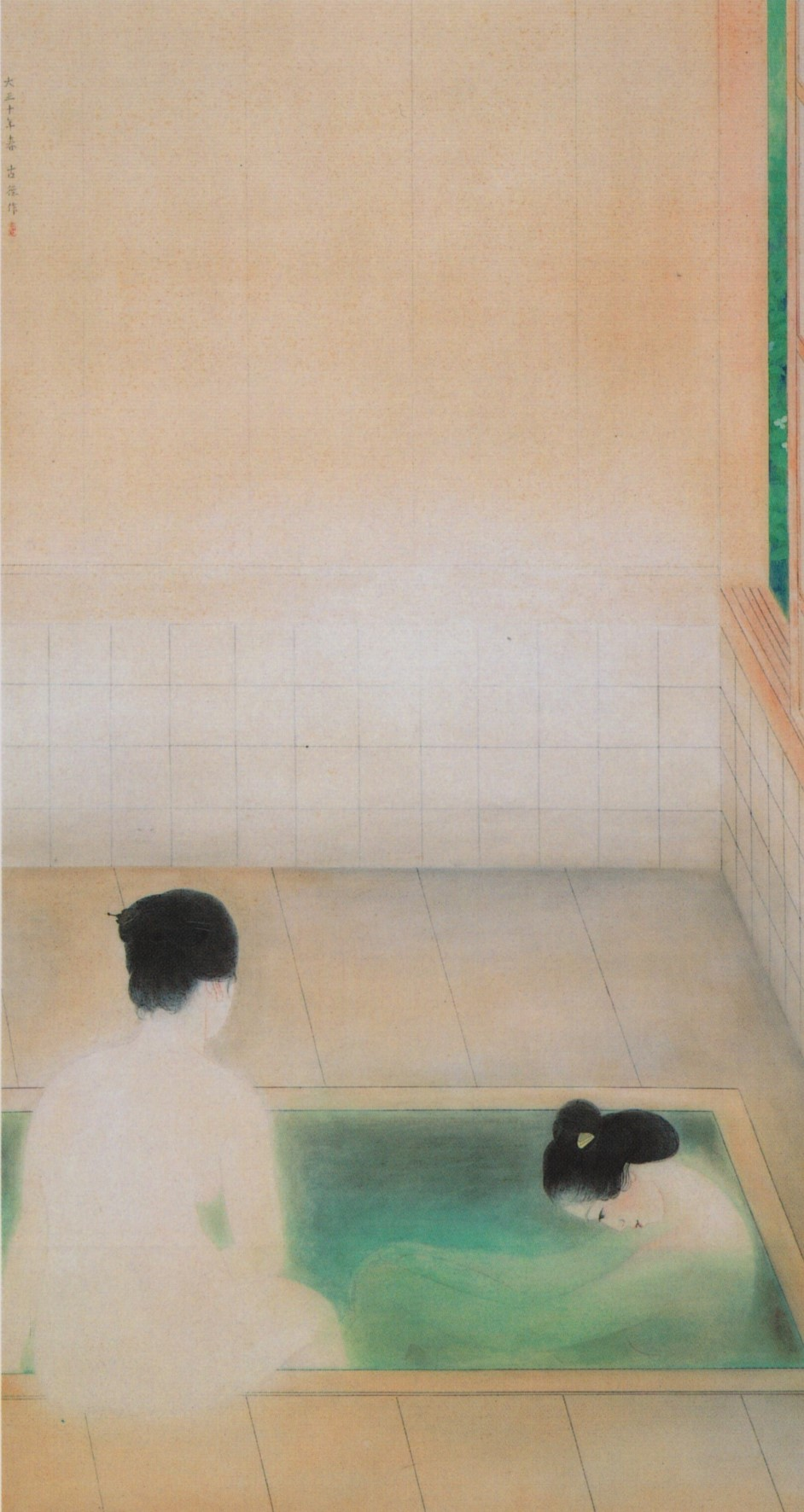
In the Bath (1918)

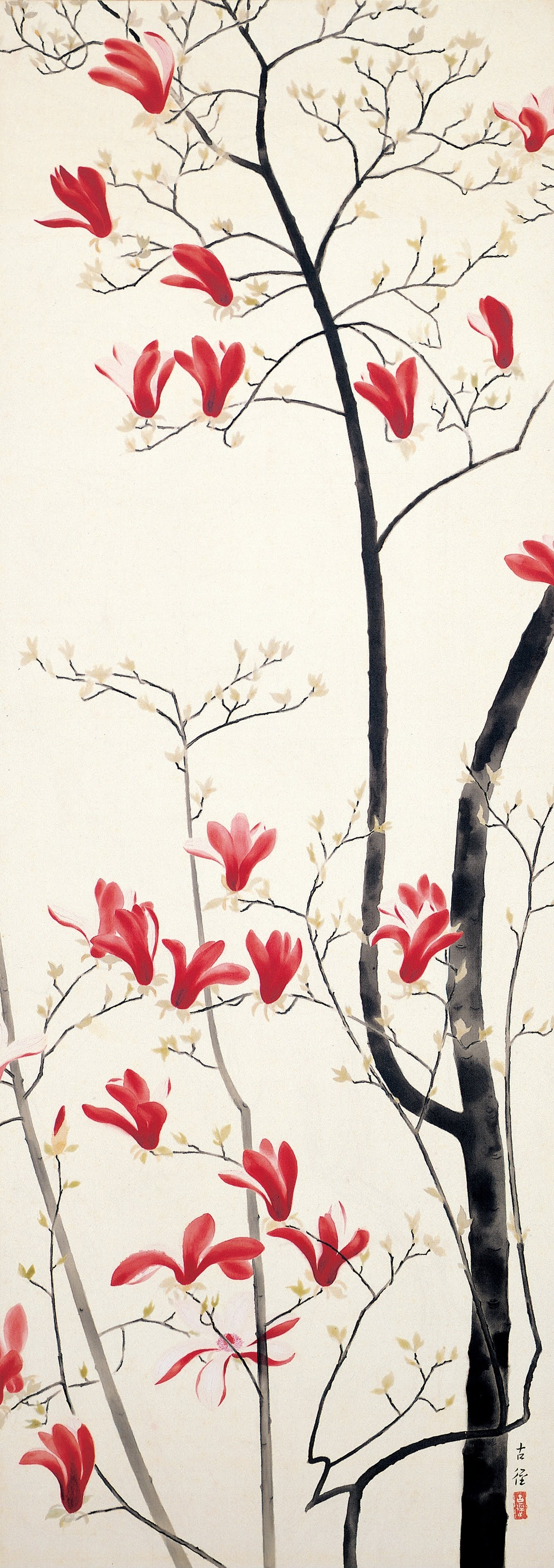
Magnolia Tree (1919)

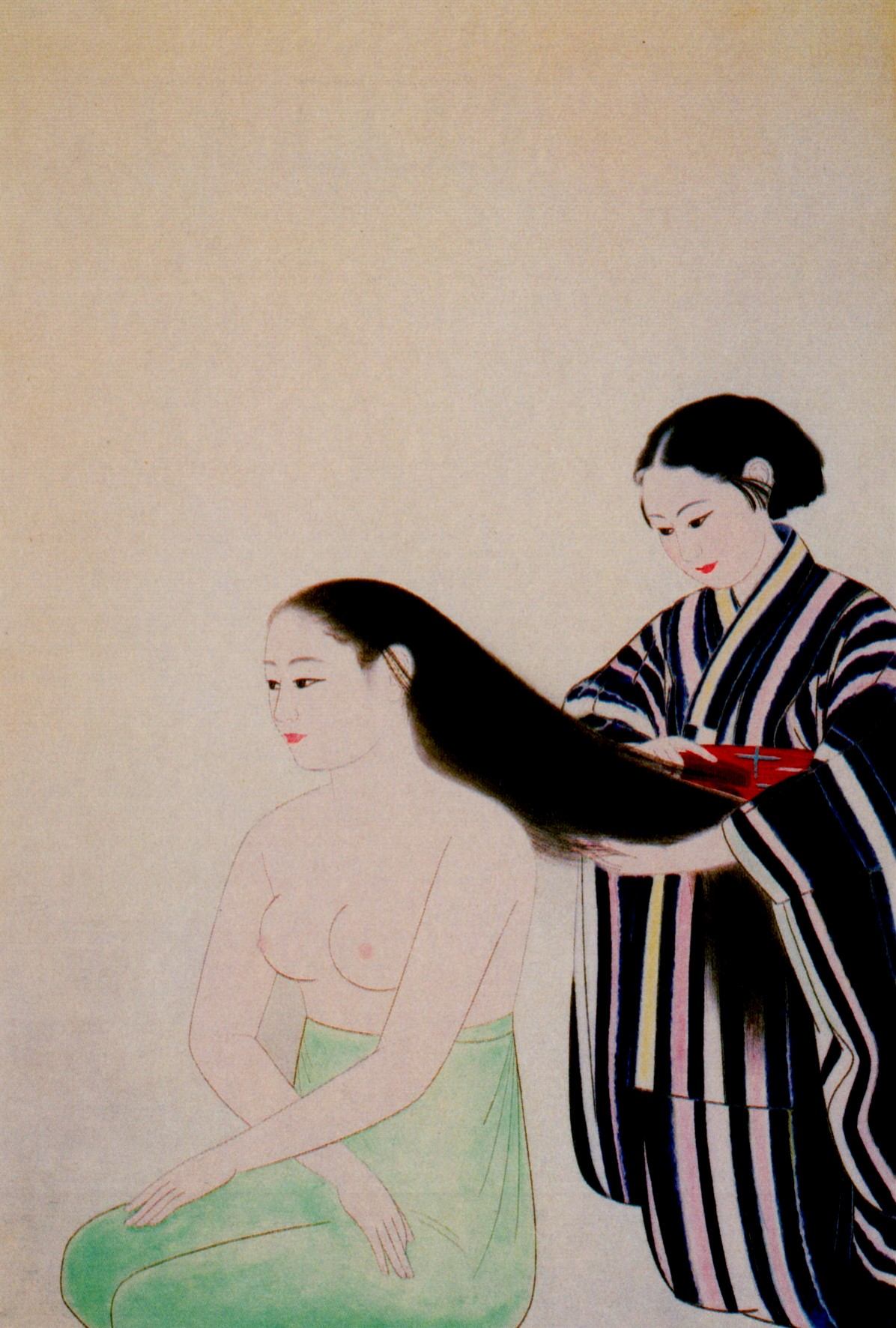
Hair (Unknown Date)

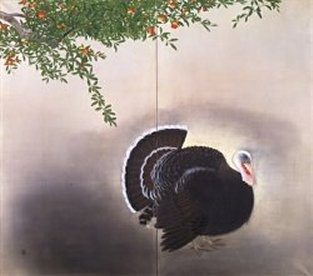
Turkey (1928)

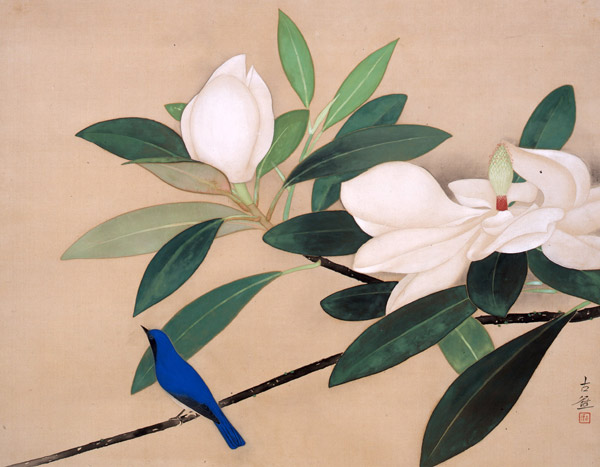
White flowers and bird (1930s)

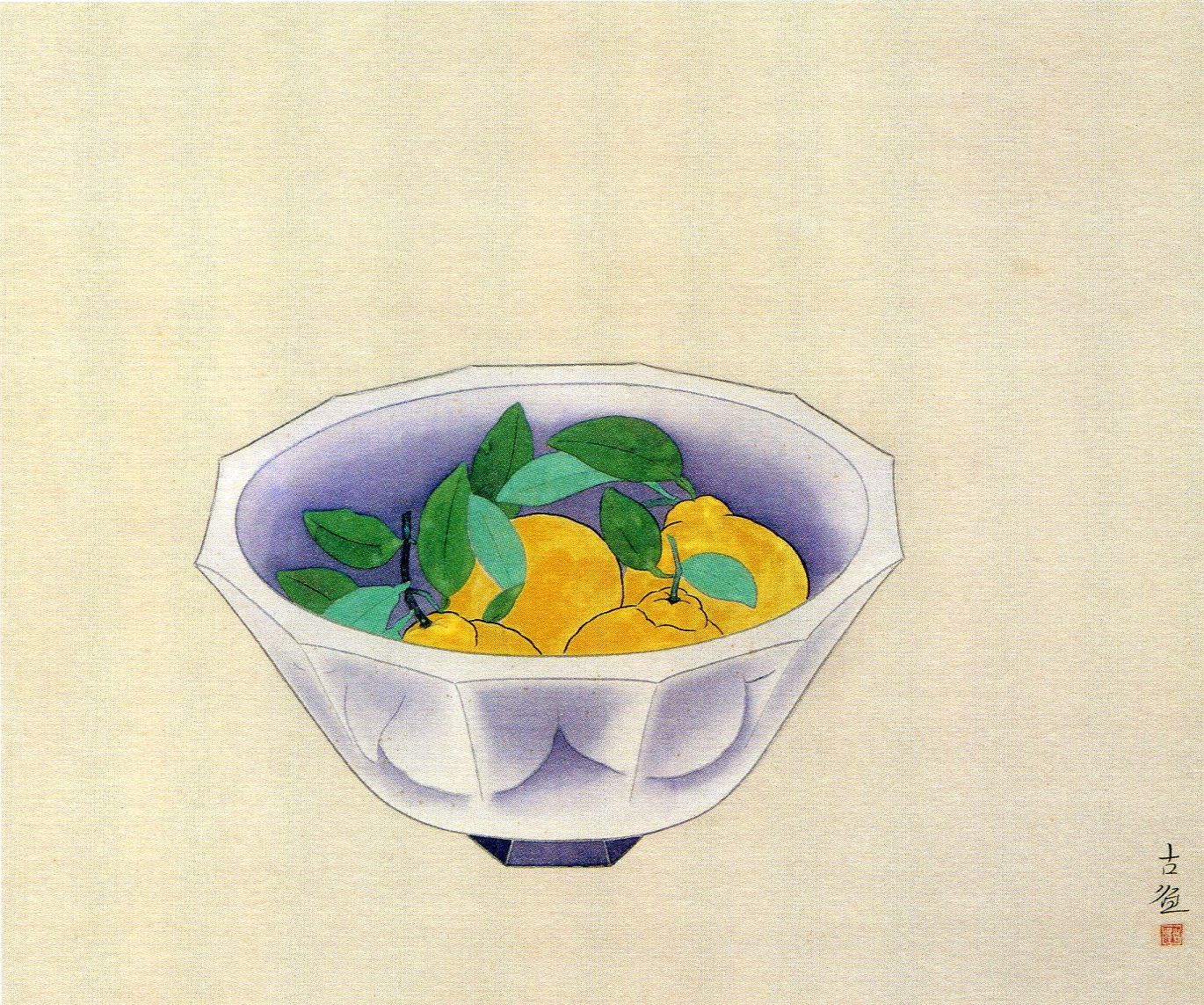
"Cherry Blossom" (1930s)

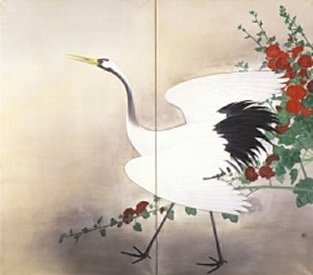
Crane (1928)

== See also ==
- Seison Maeda (1885–1977), one of the leading Nihonga painters
- List of Nihonga painters
