= Dancing on the Edge Festival =

Annual contemporary culture festival in the Netherlands

Dancing on the Edge
- Genre: Arts festival
- Dates: 2017: 8–18 November (exact dates vary each year)
- Locations: Amsterdam, Utrecht, The Hague and Rotterdam
- Country: Netherlands
- Founded: 2007
- Website: Dancing on The Edge

The Dancing on the Edge Festival is a biannual performing arts festival in the Netherlands set up in 2007. Dancing on the Edge (DOTE) stimulates artistic exchange with the Middle East and North Africa. The festival takes place over a period of ten days in November in Amsterdam, Utrecht, The Hague and Rotterdam. The focus is on contemporary theater, dance, film, music and installations. Around 10,000 tickets were sold during the last edition of the festival. In addition, DOTE organises residencies, co-productions, cultural participation projects and other programming throughout the year.

== Canada ==
Dancing on the Edge Festival, Vancouver British Columbia, is Canada's longest running contemporary dance festival. In 2018, the Festival celebrated its 30th annual festival making it the longest running professional dance festival in Canada. The organization has a solid history to build on given its thirty-year history. The festival is recognized nationally as a valued presenter of contemporary dance and has proven itself as an important partner and supporter of British Columbia dance artists.
