= Seison Maeda =

Japanese artist (1885–1977)

Maeda Seison
- 前田 青邨
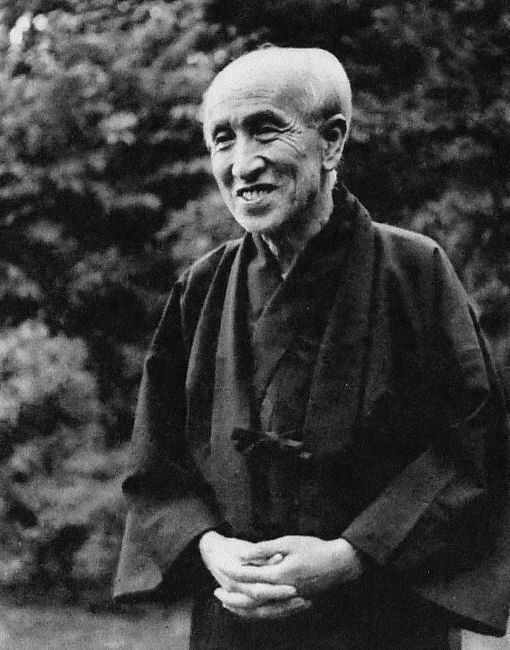
- Born: Maeda Renzō; January 27, 1885; Nakatsugawa, Gifu, Japan
- Died: October 29, 1977 (aged 92); Kamakura, Kanagawa, Japan
- Known for: Painter
- Notable work: Dokutsu no Yoritomo
- Movement: Nihonga
- Awards: Order of Culture

Seison Maeda (前田 青邨, Maeda Seison; January 27, 1885 – October 29, 1977) was the art-name of a nihonga painter in the Taishō and Shōwa periods of Japan. His legal name was Maeda Renzō. He is considered one of the greatest contemporary Japanese painters, and one of the leaders of the Nihonga movement.

== Biography ==
Maeda was born in what is now Nakatsugawa city, Gifu Prefecture in 1885. His mother died when he was 13, and he moved to Hongō in Tokyo with his father. In 1901, through the introduction of Ozaki Kōyō, Maeda enrolled at the art school headed by Kajita Hanko, from whom he received the name "Seison" in 1902. He met and befriended fellow student, Kobayashi Kokei, whose work influenced many of Maeda's early paintings.

Maeda was a member of the Kojikai artistic group from 1907, and of the Japan Fine Arts Academy (Teikoku Bijitsuin) from 1914. He visited Korea in 1915 and China in 1919. Under sponsorship of the Japan Fine Arts Academy, he visited Europe in 1922, touring Rome, Florence, Paris and London for almost one year. Although he was greatly impressed by the frescoes of the Italian Renaissance master Giotto at Assisi, Maeda remained faithful to the traditional Yamato-e and Rimpa styles of Japanese painting, and came to be known for his watercolor paintings on historical themes, primarily portraiture. However, Maeda worked in a variety of genres, including still life and landscapes.

One of his most important works, Yoritomo in a cave, depicts medieval samurai leader Minamoto no Yoritomo hiding in a cave in Izu with seven of his trusted retainers after his defeat by the Heike clan at the Battle of Ishibashiyama. The work was completed in 1929, and won the prestigious Asahi Prize in 1930. It is now on display at the Okura Shukokan museum owned by the Okura Hotels in Tokyo. It was also the subject of a postage stamp issued by the Japanese government in 1982, as part of a series honoring Japanese modern art. Maeda became a member of the Imperial Art Academy in 1937. He toured Manchukuo and northern China in 1943 under the sponsorship of the Japanese government. In 1944, Maeda was appointed as an official court painter to the Imperial Household Agency, and taught painting to Empress Kōjun.

In 1946, Maeda became an official judge of the annual Japan Arts Exhibitions (Nitten). He was also a professor at the Tokyo National University of Fine Arts and Music from 1950 until his retirement in 1959.

Maeda was awarded the Order of Culture and was named a Person of Cultural Merit in 1955. In 1967, he was selected to assist in the restoration work on the frescos of the Kondo Hall of the temple of Hōryū-ji in Nara together with Yasuda Yukihiko.

His work was selected to decorate the Shakkyō-no-Ma hall of the new Tokyo Imperial Palace. The large painting was completed in 1955. It depicts a Lion Dancer awaiting cue from the Noh play “Shakkyō” (石橋 "stone bridge"). The play is a fifth-category (kiri-nō) play featuring a lion dance (shishimai). Two pieces also by him depicting Japanese camellia were added in the 1970s on either side of the lion dancer painting, called “Shiro-botan” in white and “Beni-botan” in red.

In 1972, despite his advanced years, he was selected as the person most appropriate to assist in the restoration and preservation work of the ancient frescos in the Takamatsuzuka tumulus. In 1974, Maeda received a commission from Pope Paul VI for a painting of Hosokawa Gracia for the Vatican Museums.

Yoritomo in a Cave (洞窟の頼朝, Dokutsu no Yoritomo)
- Artist: Seison Maeda
- Year: 1929
- Type: Nihonga
- Dimensions: 190.5 cm × 269.9 cm (75.0 in × 106.3 in)
- Location: Okura Shukokan, Tokyo

After Maeda's home was destroyed by the firebombing of Tokyo during World War II, Maeda relocated to Kamakura, where he lived within sight of Kita-Kamakura Station from 1945 until his death in 1977 at the age of 92. His grave is a very distinctive 13-story white stone pagoda at the temple of Tōkei-ji in Kamakura.

== See also ==
- Yasushi Sugiyama
- Yokoyama Taikan
- Kaii Higashiyama
- List of Nihonga painters
