= Japan Art Academy =

Artistic organization in Japan

Coordinates: 35.7132337°N 139.7747533°E

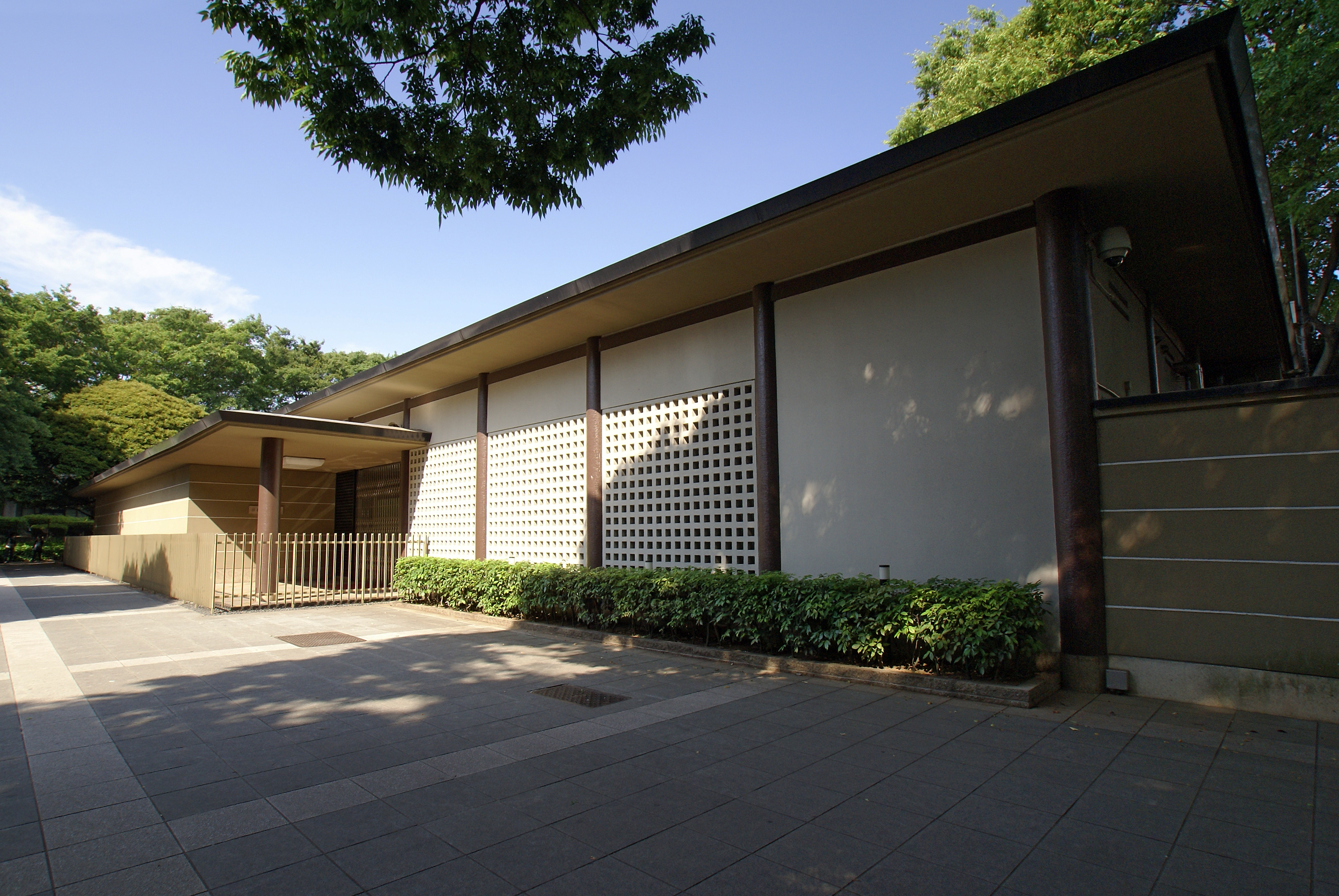
The Japan Art Academy

Japan Art Academy (日本芸術院, Nihon Geijutsu-in) is the highest-ranking official artistic organization in Japan. It is established as an extraordinary organ of the Japanese Agency for Cultural Affairs (文化庁, Bunkacho) in the thirty-first article of the law establishing the Ministry of Education, Culture, Sports, Science and Technology. The Academy discusses art-related issues, advises the Minister of Education, Culture, Sports, Science and Technology on art-related issues, and promotes arts in three categories: 1) fine art, 2) literary arts, 3) music, drama, and dance. It is closely associated with the annual Japan Art Academy Exhibition (Nitten), the premier art exhibition in Japan; the Japan Art Academy originally ran the Nitten but since 1958 the exhibition is run by a separate private institution. The Japan Art Academy headquarters is in Ueno Park, Tokyo.

The Japan Art Academy should not be confused with the Japan Art Institute, which is a completely different organization.

== History ==
The Japan Art Academy was founded in 1907 as the Fine Arts Reviewing Committee (Bijutsu Shinsa Iinkai) of the Ministry of Education. It was intended to provide quality standards and a venue for art exhibitions in late Meiji period Japan. The first of the organization's annual exhibitions, called the Bunten, was held in 1907. In 1919 the Imperial Fine Arts Academy (Teikoku Bijutsu-in) was established by imperial decree, first headed by Mori Ōgai. Upon establishment of the Imperial Arts Academy, the Fine Arts Reviewing Committee was discontinued and assimilated into the new organization, with the Bunten exhibition accordingly renamed the Teiten.

After a number of structural changes were made to the organization in response to criticism of its relevance and politics, it was eventually reorganized into the Imperial Art Academy (帝国芸術院, Teikoku Geijutsuin) in 1937, and the annual exhibition was renamed the Shinbunten. After the end of World War II, the dissolution of the Empire of Japan, and the start of the American occupation of Japan, the Imperial Art Academy was restructured as the Japan Art Academy (日本芸術院, Nihon Geijutsuin). Its annual exhibition was renamed the Japan Arts Exhibition (日本美術展覧会, nihon bijutsu tenrankai) starting from the 1946 editions (spring and fall, to make up for the lack of an exhibition in 1945), abbreviated as Nitten (日展).

In 1958, there was further re-organization whereby the Japan Fine Arts Academy became a solely academic and consultative body, and the organization of the Nitten annual exhibition was handled by a separate private company, the non-profit corporation Nitten (社団法人日展, Shadan Hōjin Nitten).

== Membership ==
The Japan Art Academy consists of a maximum of 120 members, who are appointed for life. The Academy's membership is divided into the categories as follows.

Section I: Fine Arts

- Painting (since 2022)
  - Nihonga or Japanese-style Painting (until 2022)
  - Yōga or European-style Painting (until 2022)
- Sculpture
- Crafts
- Calligraphy
- Architecture and Design (since 2022)
  - Architecture (until 2022)
- Photography and Video Arts (since 2022)

Section II: Literature

- Novels and Playwright
- Poetry
- Critics and Foreign Literature
- Manga (since 2022)

Section III: Music, Drama, and Dance

- Nōgaku
- Kabuki
- Bunraku
- Hōgaku or Traditional Japanese Music
- Yōgaku or Western Classical Music
- Dance
- Drama
- Film, including Television and Anime (since 2022)

== List of leaders ==
- Mori Ōgai (森鷗外) (1919–1922)
- Kuroda Seiki (黒田清輝) (1922–1924)
- Ryōjirō Fukuhara (福原鐐二郎) (1924–1931)
- Naohiko Masaki (正木直彦) (1931–1935)
- Tōru Shimizu (清水澄) (1937–1947)
- Seiichirō Takahashi (高橋誠一郎) (1948–1979)
- Jirō Arimitsu (有光次郎) (1979–1990)
- Tadashi Inumaru (犬丸直) (1990–2004)
- Shumon Miura (三浦朱門) (2004–2014)
- Kuroi Senji (黒井千次) (2014–2020)
- Shūji Takashina (高階秀爾) (2020–2023)
- Manzo Nomura (野村万蔵) (2023–2026)
- Yoji Yamada (山田洋次) (2026–present)

== Nitten ==
The Japan Fine Arts Exhibition (日展, Nitten (Nihon bijutsu tenrankai)) claims to be the largest combined art exhibition of its kind in the world, attracting a great number of fans and art critics. The exhibition consists five art categories: Nihonga and Western Style Painting, Sculpture, Crafts and Calligraphy. During each exhibition, works of the great masters are shown alongside works of the new but talented artists.

For ninety-nine years the exhibition (under its various names) was held at the Tokyo Metropolitan Art Museum (東京都美術館, Tōkyō-to Bijutsukan) in Ueno, but from the hundredth year in 2007 the exhibition venue was changed to the National Art Center Tokyo (国立新美術館, Kokuritsu Shin-bijutsukan) in Roppongi.

The Japan Fine Arts Exhibition decided not to award any of the top prizes in any of the 5 sections for 2013, following the revelation of fraudulent judging in the calligraphy section of the fiscal 2009 show. It was the first time since 1958, when the organization became a nonprofit corporation, that none of the prizes were awarded.
