= Chisō Gallery =

Museum in Kyoto, Japan

- 千總ギャラリー
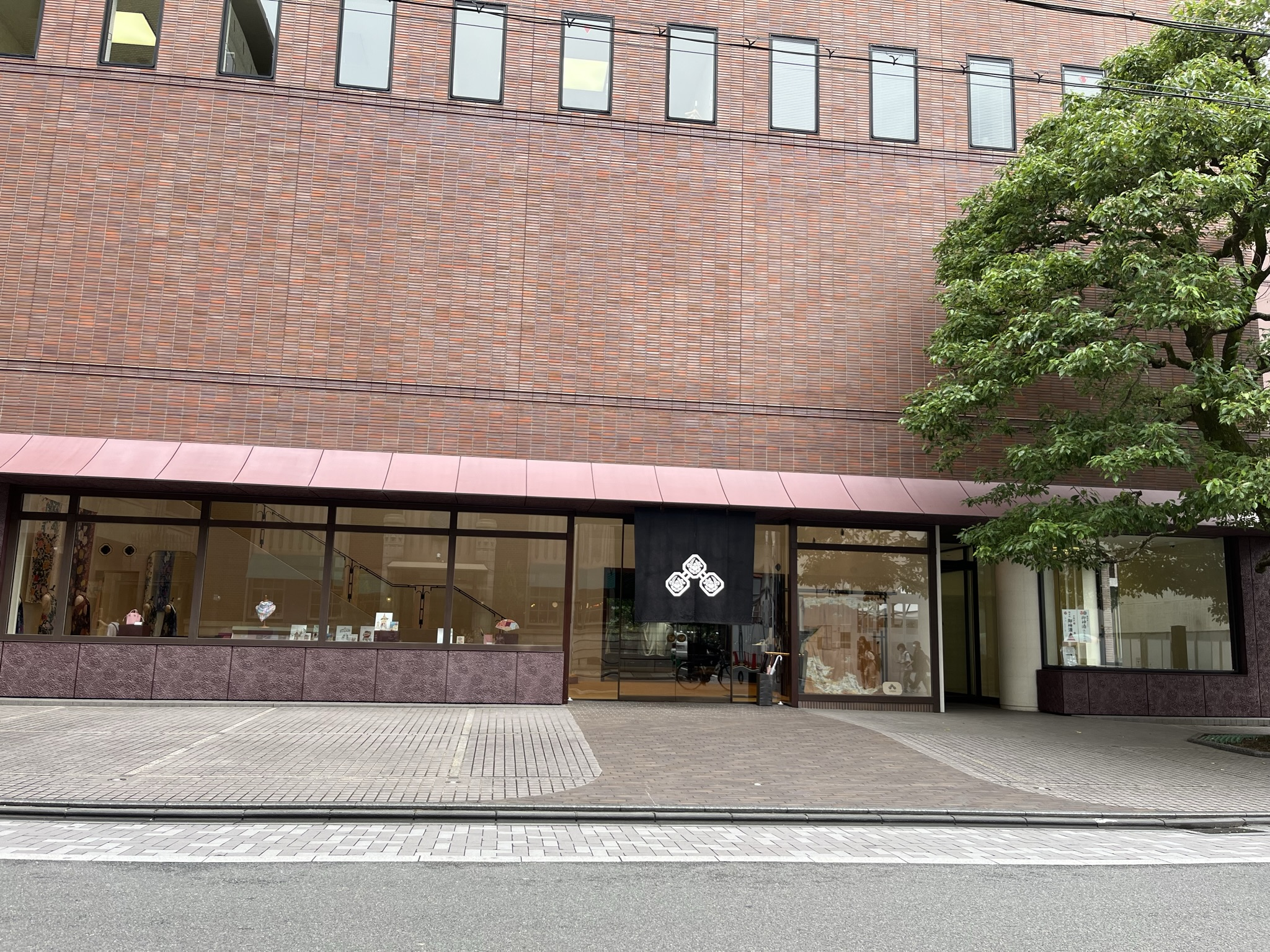
- Chisō Gallery is located on the second floor of Chisō's flagship store in central Kyoto
- Interactive map of the Chisō Gallery area

General information
- Location: 80 Mikura-chō, Sanjō Karasuma Nishiiru, Nakagyō-ku, Kyoto, Kyoto Prefecture, Japan
- Coordinates: 35°00′30″N 135°45′32″E
- Opened: 1989

Website
- Official website

Chisō Gallery (千總ギャラリー, Chisō Gyararī) opened in Nakagyō-ku, Kyoto, Japan in 1989. The Gallery displays artworks from the 20,000 strong collection of the Chisō textile company, founded in 1555. Since the addition of new display space in 2022, the first gallery focuses on works from the collection, including textiles, paintings, and historical materials, while the second exhibits works by contemporary artists.

== Important cultural properties ==
The Chisō Holdings collection includes three Important Cultural Properties, Maruyama Ōkyo's 1795 paired byōbu Hozu River; two scrolls of sketches from 1770–2 by the same artist; and Kishi Chikudō's 1875 paired byōbu Karasaki in Ōtsu.

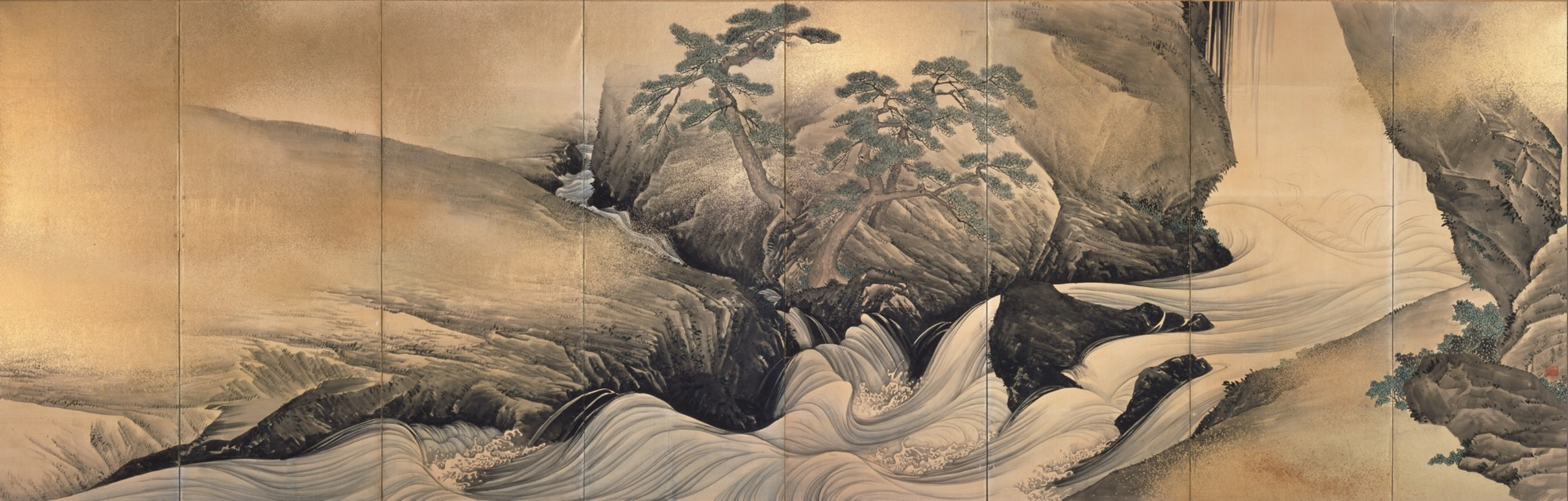
Hozu River, by Maruyama Ōkyo

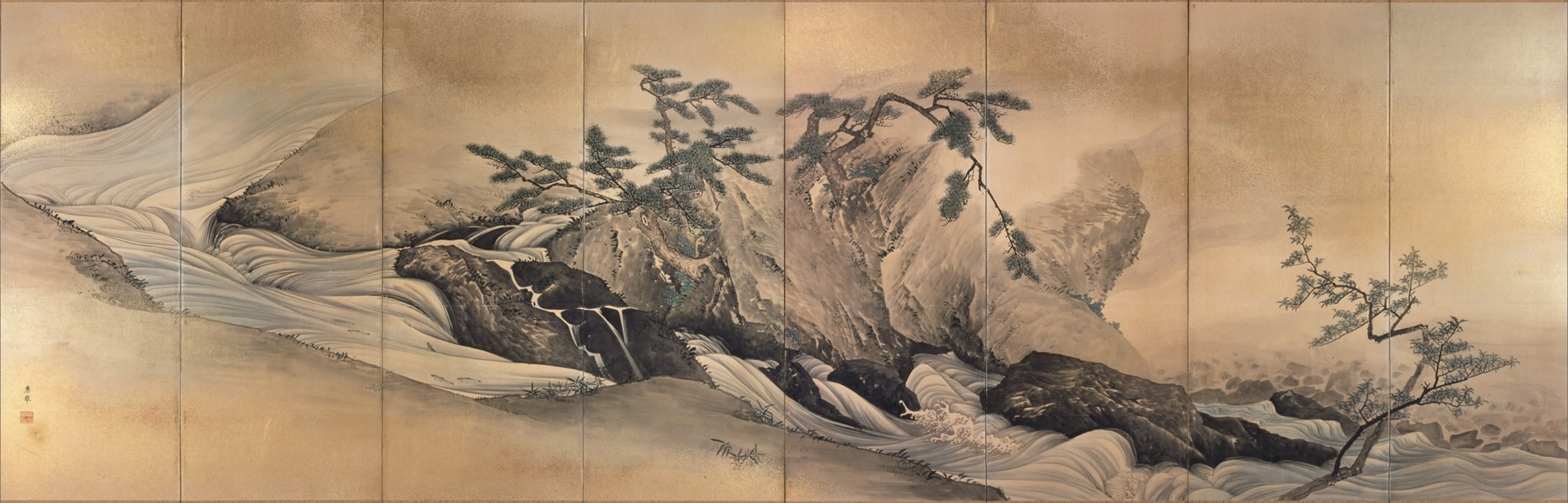
Hozu River, by Maruyama Ōkyo

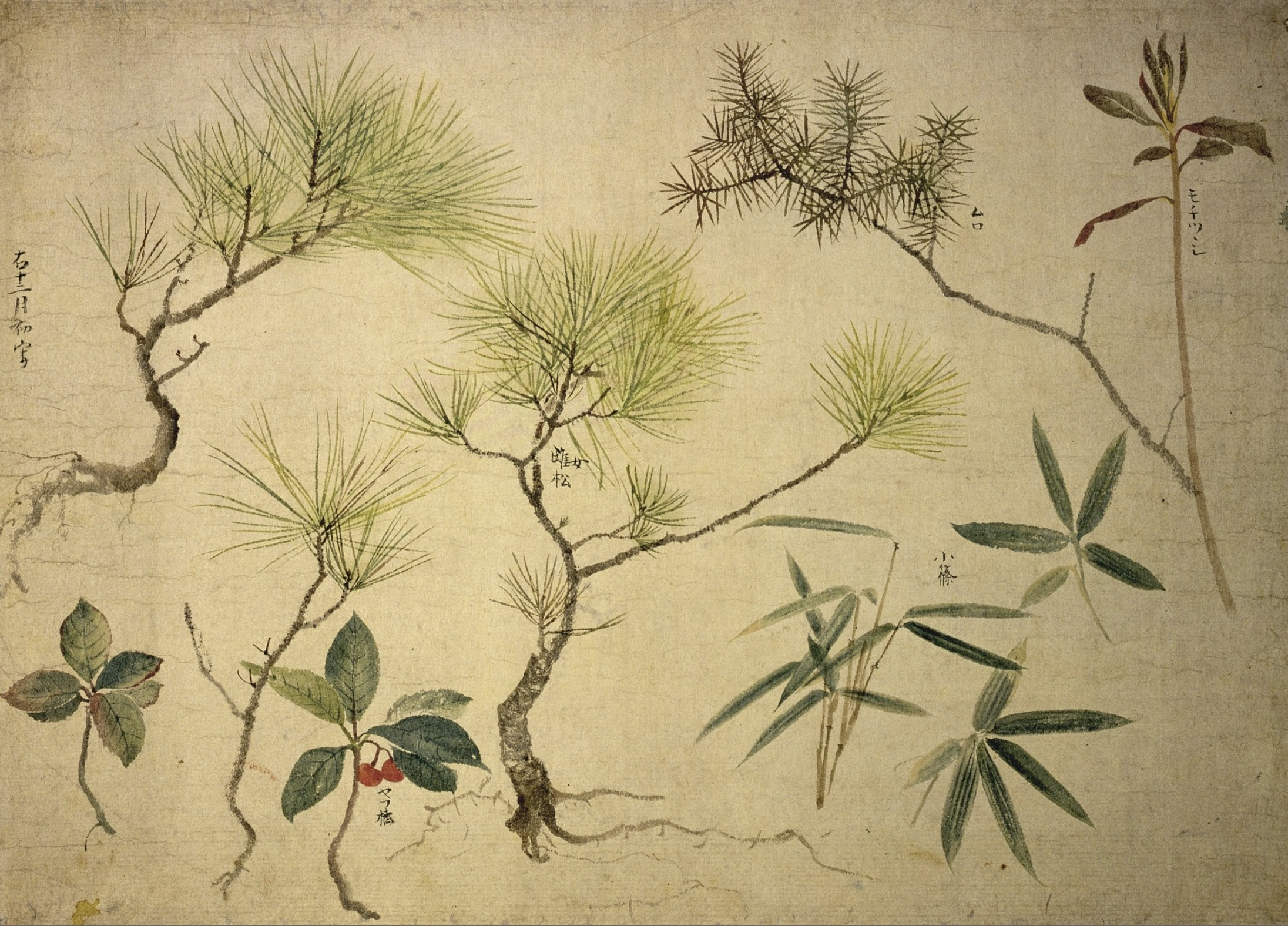
Sketch of leaves, by Maruyama Ōkyo

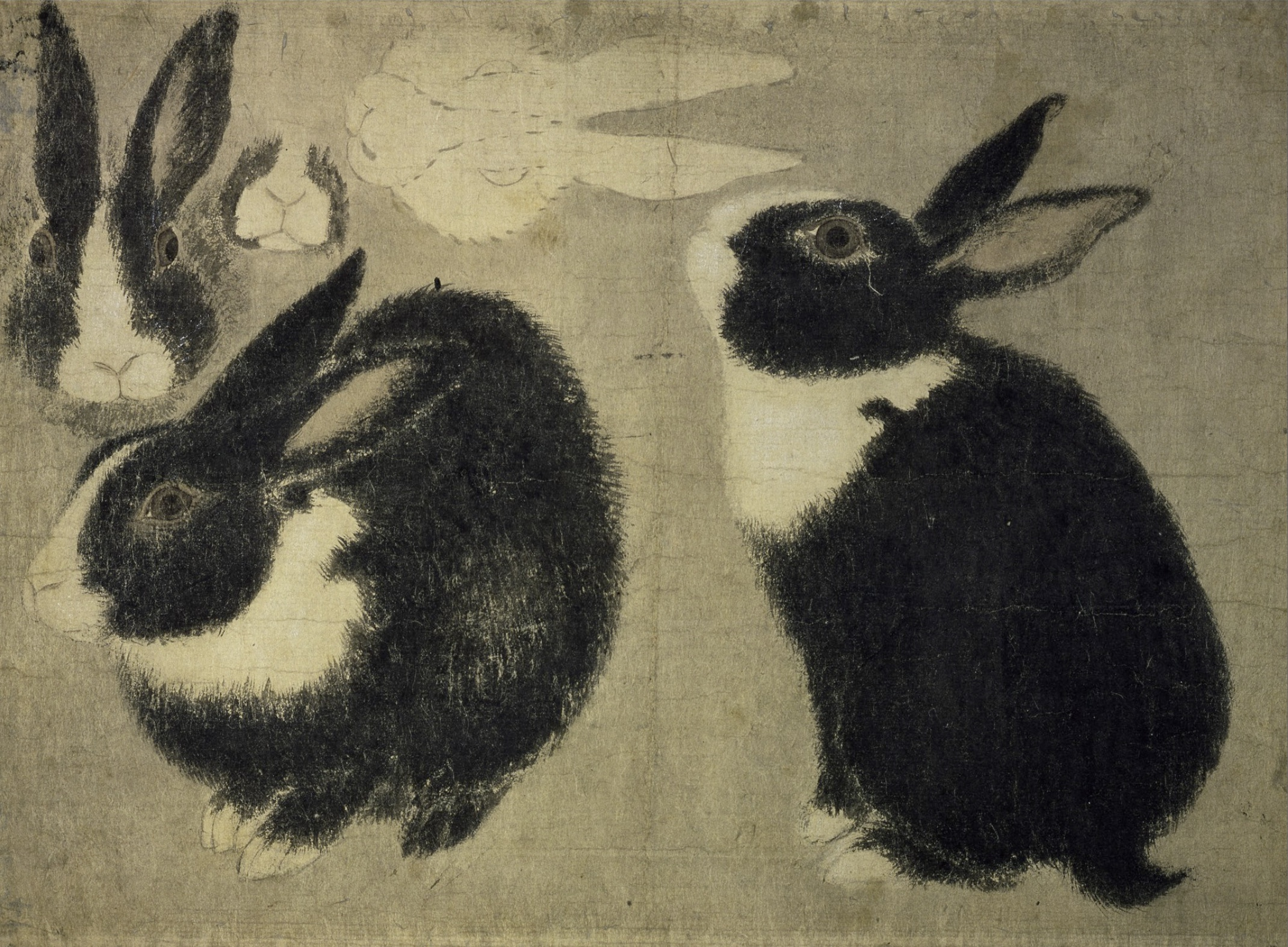
Sketch of rabbits, by Maruyama Ōkyo

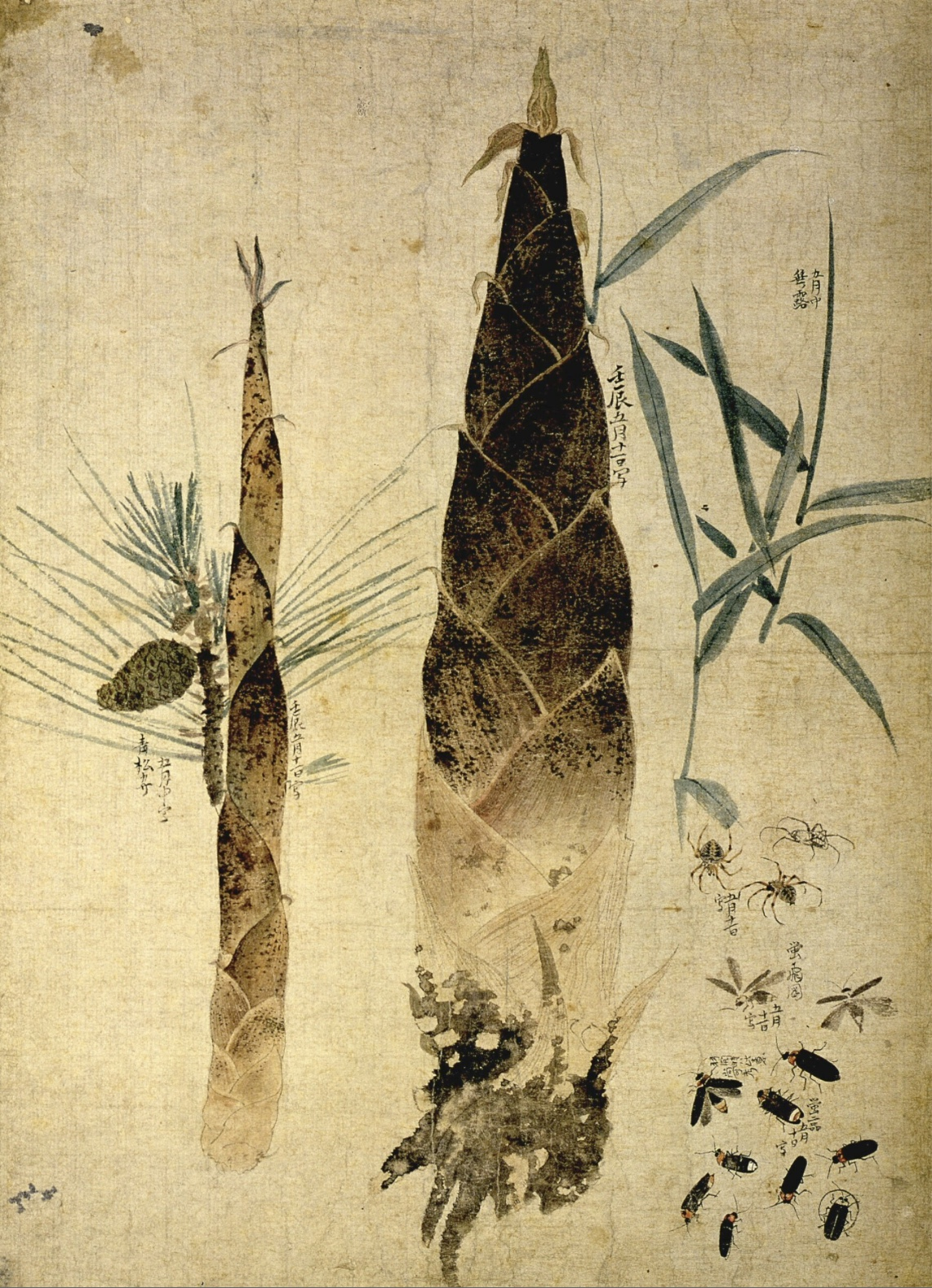
Sketch of bamboo, by Maruyama Ōkyo

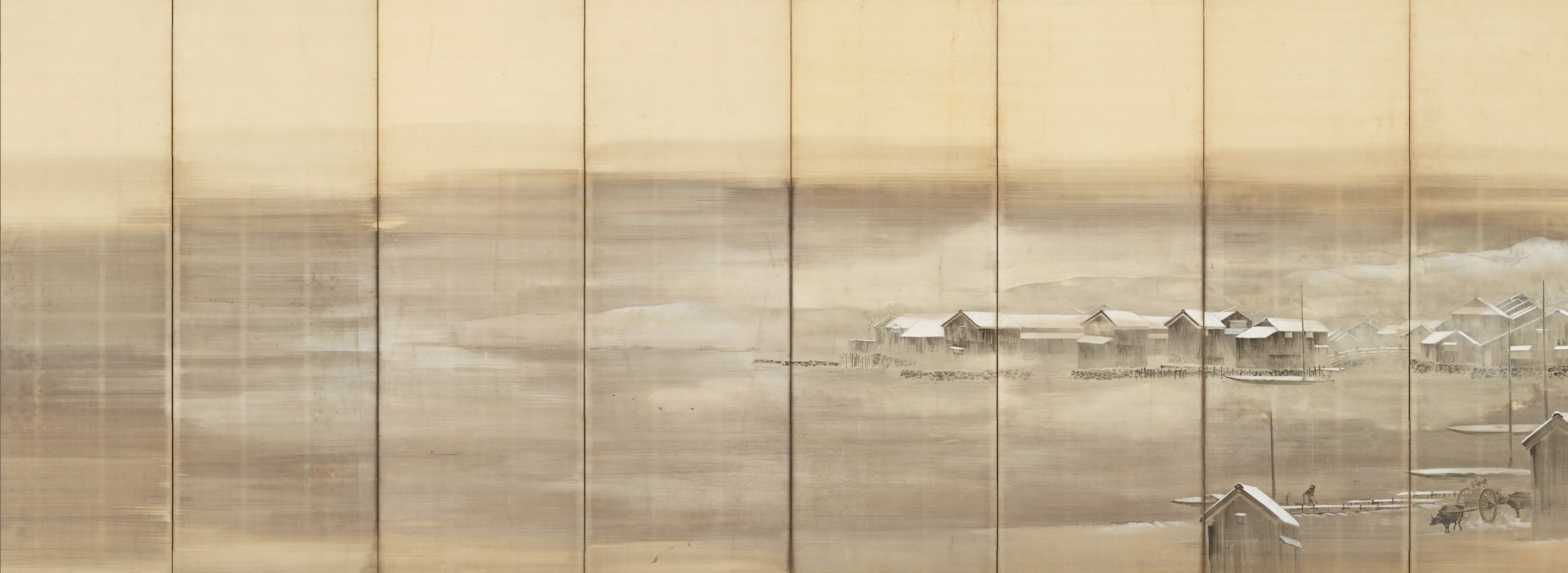
Karasaki in Ōtsu, by Kishi Chikudō

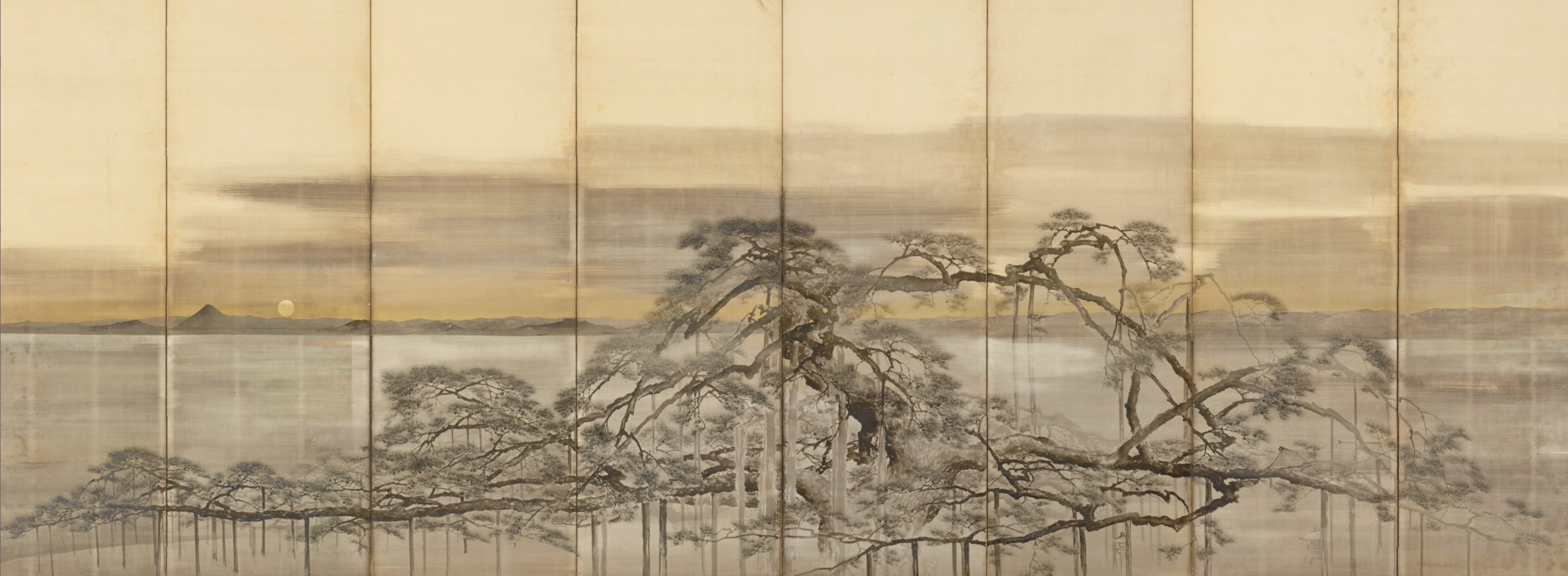
Karasaki in Ōtsu, by Kishi Chikudō

== See also ==
- Kyoto National Museum
- Kyoto Municipal Museum of Art
- Kyoto Art Center
