= Nishiyama Suisho =

Japanese painter (1879–1958)

Nishiyama Suishō (西山翠嶂; April 2, 1879 – March 30, 1958) was a Japanese painter.

== Early life ==
Nishiyama Suishō was born "Nishiyama Usaburo" in Kyoto in 1879. He studied with Takeuchi Seihō (1864-1942), a famous painter from Kyoto. In 1915, he married Takeuchi Tei, one of his master's daughters.

== Career ==
In 1899, Nishiyama graduated from Kyoto City School of Arts and Crafts. Soon after, he became head of Kyoto City Specialist School of Painting. In time, he and Kikuchi Keigetsu (1879-1955) became important figures in the Kyoto art world. Nishiyama exhibited in Teiten, Bunten, and Inten, art exhibitions sponsored by the government. Also, he was a member of the Imperial Art Academy and Imperial Household Art Committee. He received the Order of Cultural Merit in 1957.

Nishiyama was most well known for his paintings and, thus, produced few prints.

== Notable Pupils ==
- Tatsu Hirota
- Kuma Mukai
- Nakamura Daizaburō
