= Tsuru (name) =

Tsuru (鶴) is a Japanese name. It means crane, and is used as a given name and a surname. Notable people with the name include:

== Given name ==
- Tsuru Aoki (1892–1961), Japanese stage and silent film actress
- Tsuru Morimoto (born 1970), Japanese football player

== Surname ==
- Ayako Tsuru (born 1941), Mexican artist of Japanese descent
- Hiromi Tsuru (1960–2017), Japanese voice actress
- Kiso Tsuru (1894–1966), Japanese philanthropist
- Naoto Tsuru (born 1987), Japanese baseball player
- Norihiro Tsuru, Japanese violinist and composer
- Shigeto Tsuru (1912–2006), Japanese economist and politician
- Toshiyuki Tsuru, anime director
