= Tsuru =

Tsuru (鶴) is the Japanese word for crane. It may refer to:

- Tsuru (name), a Japanese name
- Tsuru, Yamanashi, a city in Japan
  - Tsuru University, located in the city
- Tsuru Shima, a uninhabited island in Okayama Prefecture, Japan
- Nissan Sentra, a car formerly marketed in Mexico as the Tsuru

== See also ==
- Tsurui, a village in Hokkaido
