= Mukai =

Mukai may refer to:

- Mukai (The King of Fighters), a character in the video game series The King of Fighters
- Mukai, an album by Louis Mhlanga
- Mukai, a character in the manga Riki-Oh

== People with the surname ==
- Chiaki Mukai, Japanese physician and astronaut
- Chiaki Mukai (Go player), Japanese Go player
- Chie Mukai, Japanese composer and musician
- Hirofumi Mukai, Japanese boxer
- Kan Mukai, Japanese film director, cinematographer, producer and screenwriter
- Kuma Mukai, Japanese painter
- Koji Mukai, Japanese singer and actor
- Masahiro Mukai, Japanese director
- Masao Mukai, Japanese choir conductor
- Natsumi Mukai, manga artist
- Osamu Mukai, Japanese actor
- Shigeharu Mukai, Japanese jazz trombonist
- Shigeru Mukai, Japanese mathematician
- Mukai Shōgen Tadakatsu (1582−1641), Japanese samurai and admiral
- Shogo Mukai, Japanese rugby coach
- Shoichiro Mukai (向 翔一郎; born 1996), Japanese judoka
- Taichi Mukai, Japanese singer, songwriter and model
