= Nakamura Daizaburō =

Japanese painter (1898–1947)

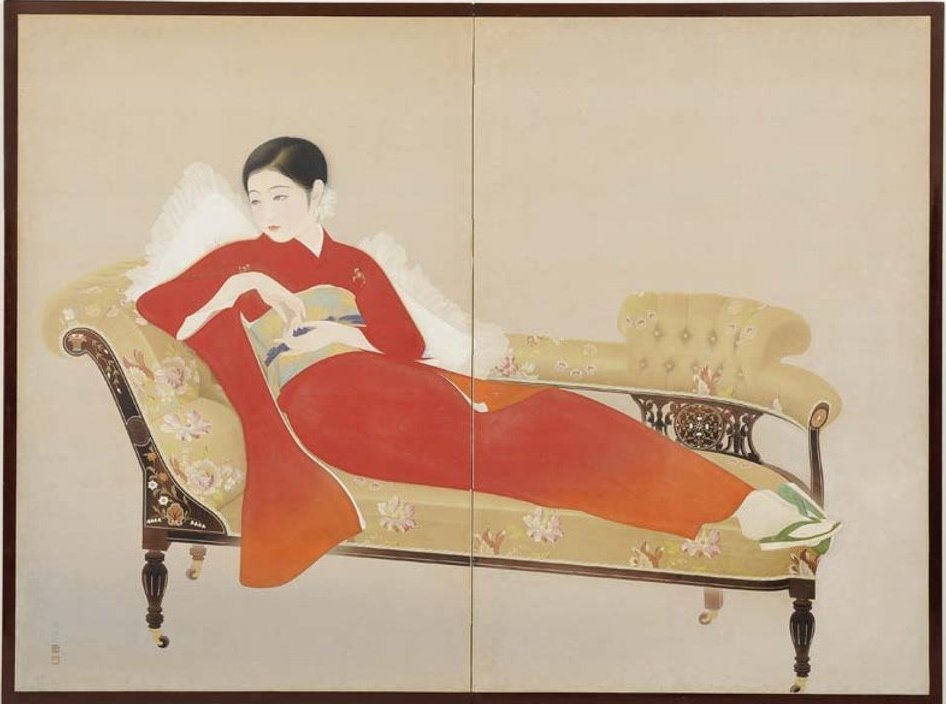
Woman (Fujo) by Nakamura Daizaburö, 1930, Honolulu Museum of Art

Nakamura Daizaburō 中村大三郎 (1898–1947) was a Japanese painter active during the Taishō and Shōwa eras. He was born in Kyoto, the eldest son of a kimono dyer. He studied at the Kyoto Municipal School of Fine Arts and Crafts from 1912 to 1916. He then entered the Kyoto Municipal School of Painting, where he studied under Nishiyama Suisho, and was appointed to the faculty in 1925.

Like his teacher, Nishiyama Suisho, Daizaburō is best known for his paintings of women, such as Heron Maiden. The Art Institute of Chicago and the Honolulu Museum of Art are among the public collections holding paintings by Nakamura Daizaburō.
