= National Museum of Modern Art, Kyoto =

Museum in Kyoto, Japan

- 京都国立近代美術館
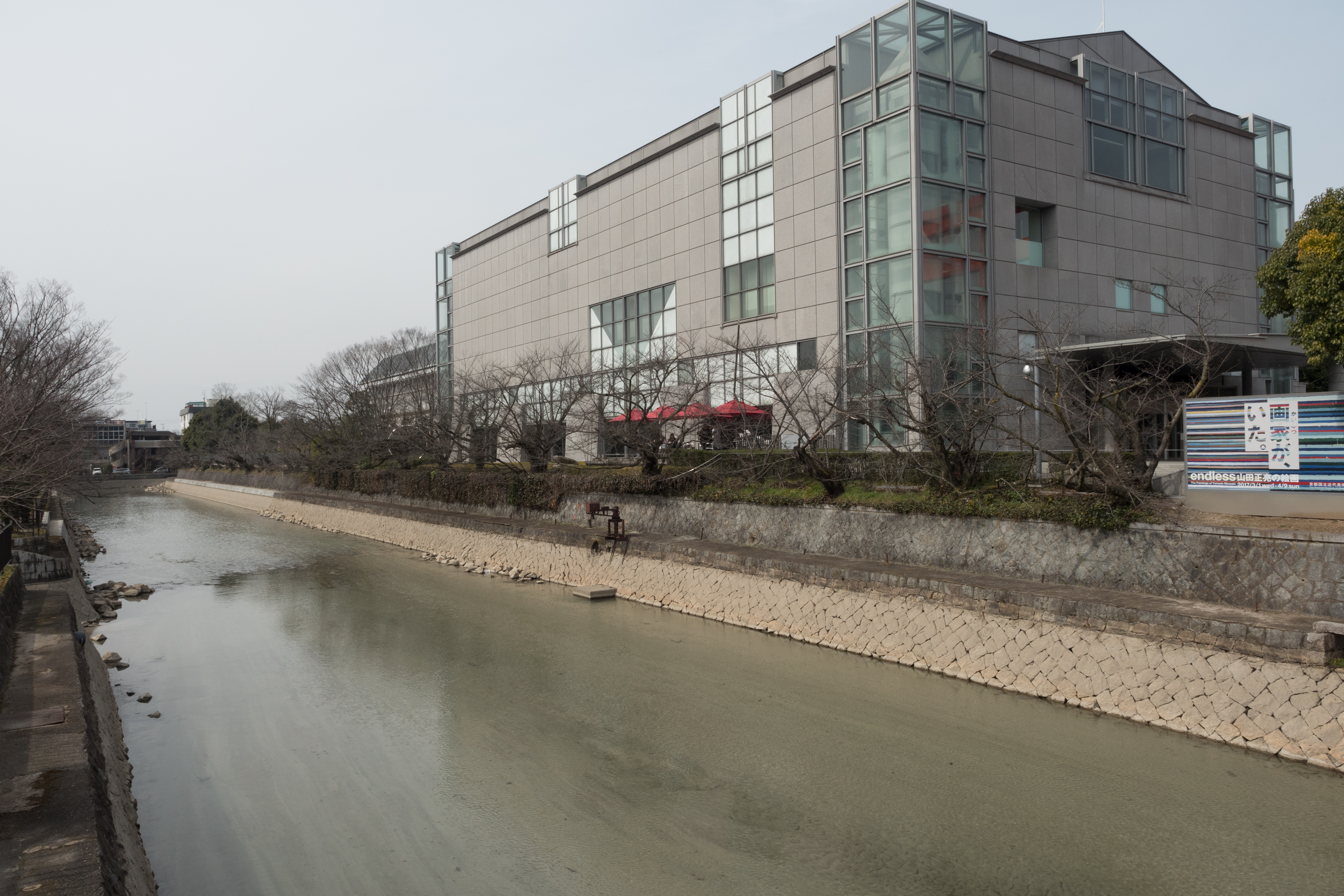

- Location within Kyoto city Location within Japan
- Established: 1 March 1963
- Location: Sakyo-ku, Kyoto, Japan
- Coordinates: 35°0′45″N 135°46′55″E
- Type: Art museum
- Visitors: 326,288 (2016)
- Architect: Fumihiko Maki
- Public transit access: Okazaki Koen / Bijutsukan, Heian Jingu-mae, Kyoto City Bus; Higashiyama Station, Municipal Subway Tōzai Line
- Website: www.momak.go.jp/English/

Kyoto Museums Four
- National Museum of Modern Art, Kyoto; Kyoto National Museum; Kyoto Municipal Museum of Art; Museum of Kyoto

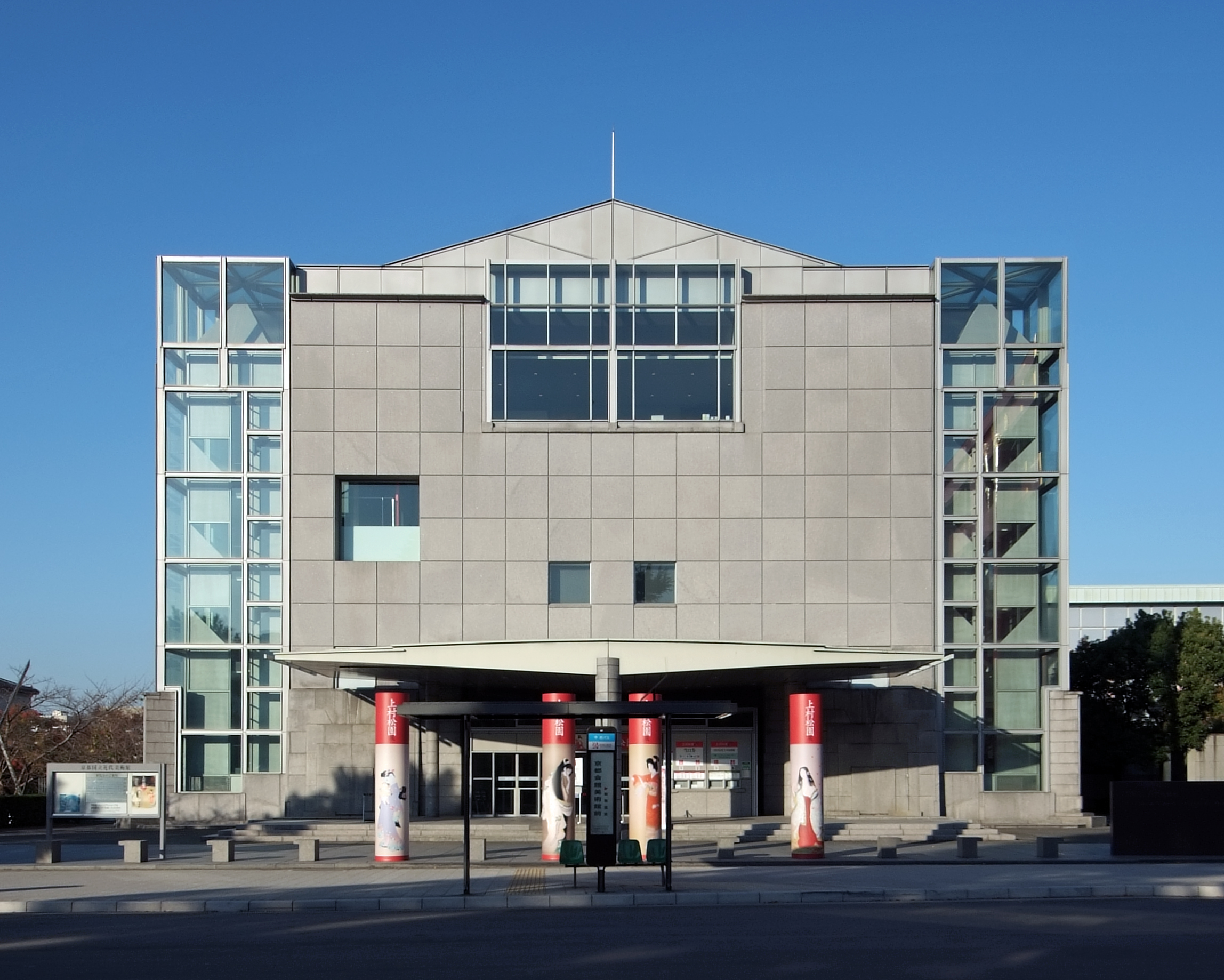
Main entrance to National Museum of Modern Art in Kyoto.

The National Museum of Modern Art, Kyoto (京都国立近代美術館, Kyōto Kokuritsu Kindai Bijutsukan) is an art museum in Kyoto, Japan.

This Kyoto museum is also known by the English acronym MoMAK (Museum of Modern Art, Kyoto).

== History ==
The National Museum of Modern Art, Kyoto (MoMAK) was initially created as the Annex Museum of the National Museum of Modern Art in Tokyo. MoMAK was established on its present site on March 1, 1963. Its building, formerly the auxiliary building of the Kyoto Municipal Exhibition Hall for Industrial Affairs, was transferred from Kyoto City to the National Museum after restoration. On June 1, 1967, the Kyoto Annex Museum officially became the National Museum of Modern Art, Kyoto. Seventeen years later, the old building was dismantled and the present building, designed by Fumihiko Maki was completed.

The museum was opened to the public on October 26, 1986, with 9,761.99 m² total floor area and 2,604.94 m² exhibition area.

== MoMAK collections ==
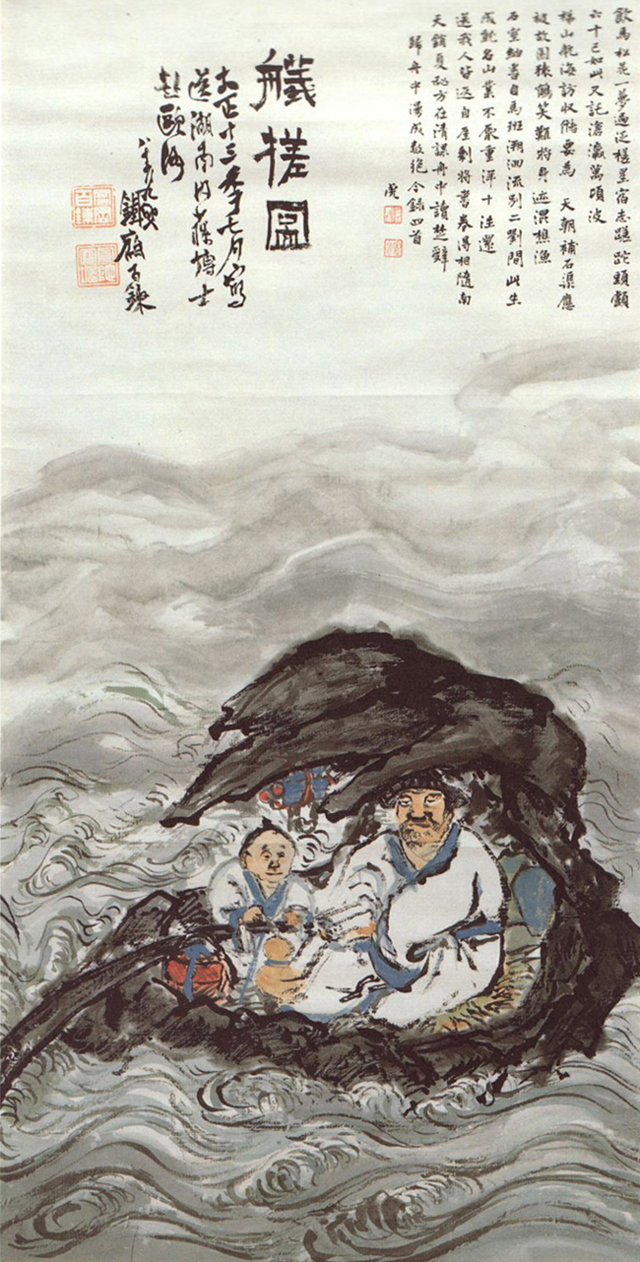
Embarking on a Raft by Tomioka Tessai in the National Museum of Modern Art, Kyoto.

MoMAK is a national institution devoted to the collection and preservation of artworks and related reference materials of the twentieth century in Japan and other parts of the world. Particular *emphasis is placed on artists or artistic movements in Kyoto and the Kansai area (the western region of Japan), such as Japanese-style paintings of the Kyoto School.

The gallery exhibits selected works of Japanese-style painting (nihonga), Western-style painting (yōga), prints, sculpture, crafts (ceramics, textiles, metalworks, wood and bamboo works, lacquers and jewelry) and photography from the museum collection, rotating the works on display approximately twenty times a year. Outstanding and monumental works of modern art in Japan, as well as modern and contemporary European and American art are also exhibited.

=== Union catalog ===
The Union Catalog of the Collections of the National Art Museums, Japan, is a consolidated catalog of material held by the four Japanese national art museums—the National Museum of Modern Art, Kyoto (MoMAK), the National Museum of Modern Art, Tokyo (MOMAT), the National Museum of Art, Osaka (NMAO), and the National Museum of Western Art in Tokyo (NMWA):

- National Museum of Modern Art, Kyoto (MoMAK).
- National Museum of Modern Art, Tokyo (MOMAT)
- National Museum of Art, Osaka (NMAO)
- National Museum of Western Art (NMWA)

The online version of this union catalog is currently under construction, with only selected works available at this time.

=== Selected artists ===
- Yaacov Agam (1928– ), Israel
- Pierre Alechinsky (1927– ), Belgium
- Jean Arp (1886–1966), France
- Georges Braque (1882–1963), France
- André Breton (1896–1966), France
- Marc Chagall (1887–1985), France
- Dale Chihuly (1941– ), US
- Max Ernst (1891–1976), Germany
- Tsuguharu Fujita (1886–1968), Japan
- David Gilhooly (1943–2013), US
- Sibyl Heijnen (1960– ), Netherlands
- Barbara Hepworth (1903–1975), UK
- Kaii Higashiyama (1908–1999), Japan
- Shunso Hishida (1874–1911), Japan
- David Hockney (1937– ), UK
- Oda Kaisen (1785–1862), Japan
- Wassily Kandinsky (1866–1944), Romania
- Tomioka Tessai (1837–1924), Japan
- Ayako Tsuru (1941– ), Mexico
- Frank Lloyd Wright (1867–1959), US

== See also ==
- List of Independent Administrative Institutions (Japan)
