= Sibyl Heijnen =

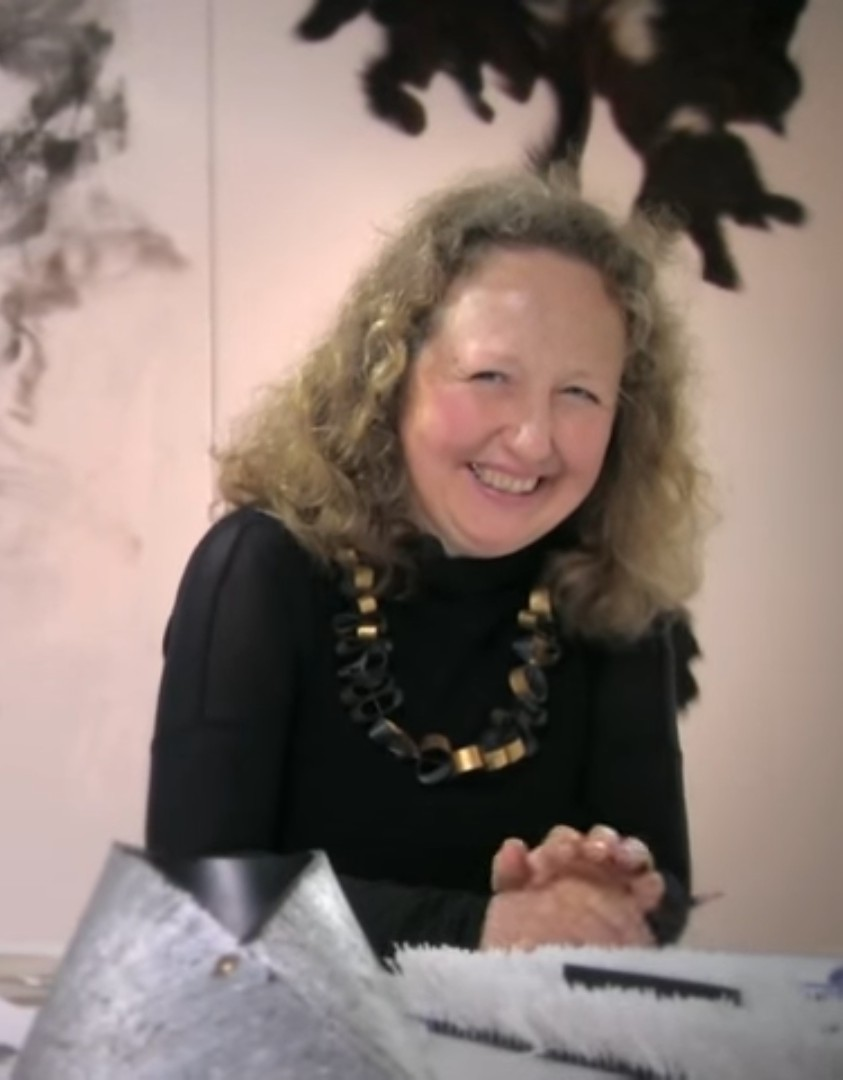
Sibyl Heijnen ,2015

Sibyl Heijnen (1961) is a Dutch visual artist, part of the second generation after 1960. She graduated from the Gerrit Rietveld Academy in Amsterdam, the Netherlands in 1985. She is known for working with a wide range of materials and techniques, not limited to a particular spatial scale, transcending all boundaries of art.

She has received many grants and awards and her art can be found in private and public collections, such as the Metropolitan Museum of Art in New York and at exhibitions in many countries. A highlight in her career was the event 'LOOK! Sibyl Heijnen' at the National Museum of Modern Art, Kyoto (MOMAK). Room for reflection at Museum de Fundatie, castle het Nijenhuis, Heino/Weihe NL Sibyl Heijnen is also known for her plans to transform Times Square and Broadway.

== International recognition ==
- 1990: Jugend Gestaltet Preis in Munich, Germany;
- 1989: Selected to contribute to the 2nd International Textile Competition in Kyoto, Japan;
- 1992: Excellence Award at 3rd International Textile Competition in Kyoto, Japan;
- 1999: Selected to contribute to EU exhibition “Living Waters” in Helsinki, Finland;
- 2002: ArtLink@Sotheby’s International Young Art 2002 finalist.
- 2009: Herman Krikhaar award, Almelo, NL
- 2016: Excellence Award, Fibre Art Biennale, Shenzhen CN
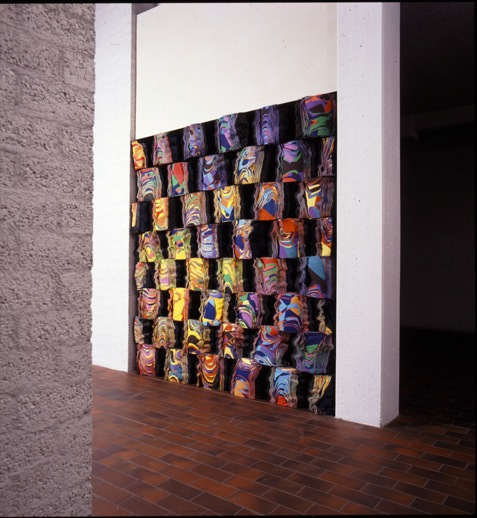
Colorful side of Two Sides of the Same Coin

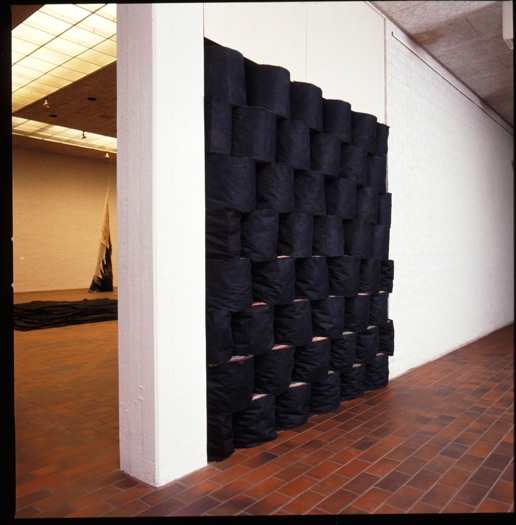
Dark side of Two Sides of the Same Coin

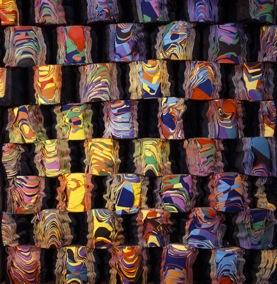
Detail of the colorful side of Two Sides of the Same Coin

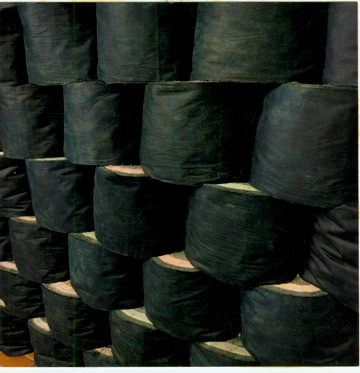
Detail of the dark side of Two Sides of the Same Coin

== Development ==
Art historian and publicist Peggie Breitbarth identified three key works in Heijnen’s oeuvre up to 2007:

1. The two sides of the same coin 1, 1990. This work contained two miles of cotton cloth, weighed 800 kilograms and measured 220 x 240 x 40 centimeters.
2. Gateway, 1993. This is a lane of honor made of hanging rubber, the overture to a number of large hanging works.
3. Theater curtain, 2006. This computer-operated moving work contains 9-meter-long strips of processed and gilded synthetics that cover a 144-square-meter stage opening and a frieze. It introduces the time factor in Heijnen’s work.

Textile historian and curator Mary Schoeser wrote in 2012 the book The art of mankind in which 3 works of Sibyl Heijnen are referenced. Published by Thames and Hudson. Publicist Rob Smolders wrote in 2017 an article for the catalogue for Personal Structures - Open Borders, an exhibition organised by GAA Foundation during the Venice Biennale 2017. The text is about Room for reflection, the site specific works of Sibyl Heijnen:

== Work ==
Major solo exhibitions (selection)

1. Look! Sibyl Heijnen, National Museum of Modern Art, Kyoto JP
2. Moving, Gallery lebain, Kyoto JP
3. New Beginning, Former cloister Maria ad Fontes, Ootmarsum NL
4. Room for reflection, Museum de Fundatie, castle het Nijenhuis, Heino/Weihe NL

Major group exhibitions (selection)

1. Beyond Textile, National Museum of modern Art, Kyoto JP and Meguro Museum, Kyoto JP.
2. Personal structures - Room for reflection, Venice It

Public collections (selection)

1. Textielmuseum, Tilburg NL
2. Public art, Hengelo NL.
3. Public art, Zwolle NL.
4. Public art, Almelo NL.
5. Metropolitan Museum of Art, NYC
