= Museum of Kyoto =

Museum in Kyoto, Japan

- 京都文化博物館
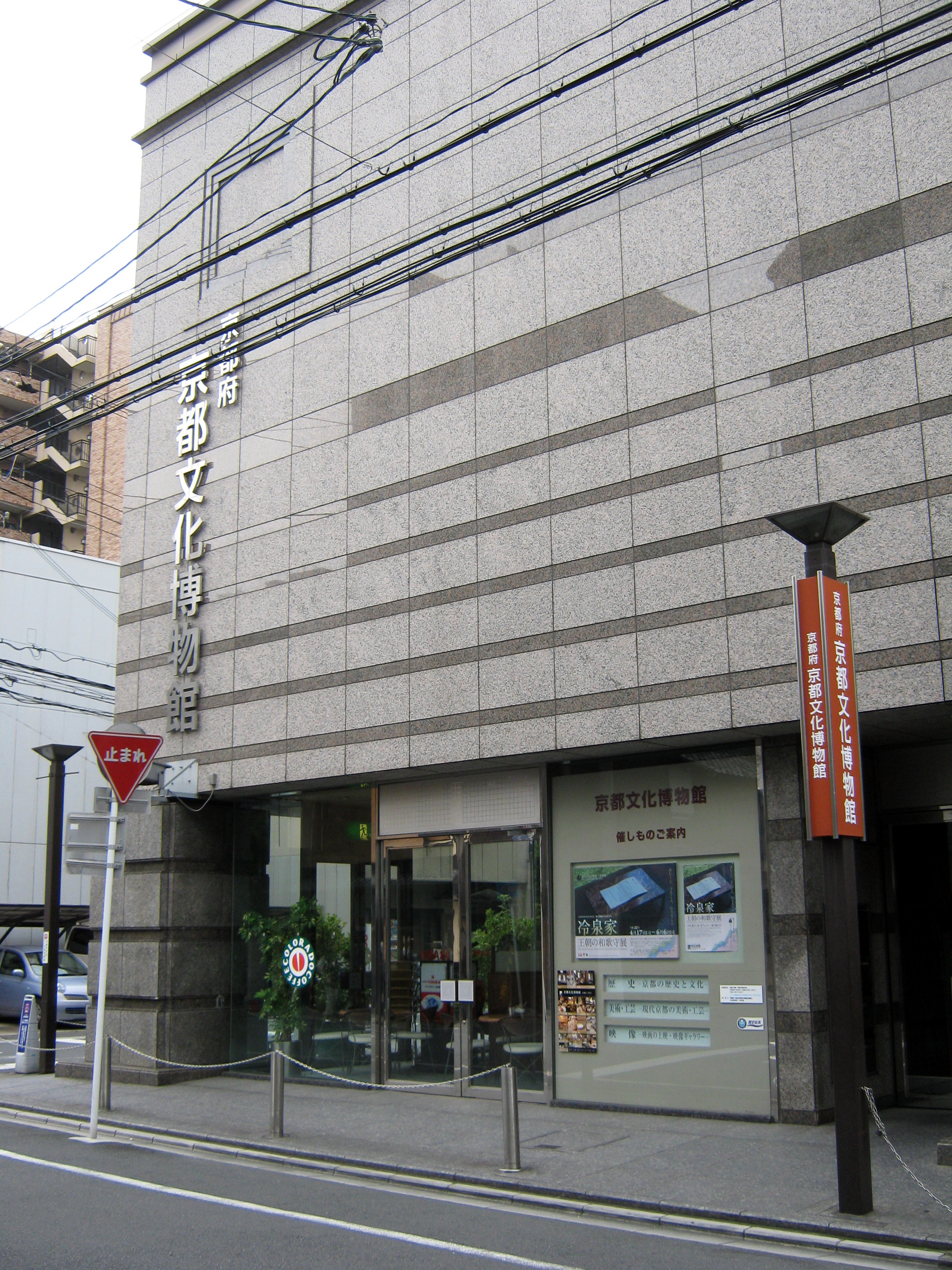
- Former name: Heian Museum of Ancient History
- Established: 1 October 1988
- Location: Nakagyō, Kyoto, Japan
- Coordinates: 35°00′33″N 135°45′44″E
- Type: History museum
- Founder: Kyoto Culture Foundation
- Director: Keiji Yamada
- Architect: Tatsuno Kingo (Annex)
- Owner: Kyoto prefectural government
- Public transit access: Kyoto City Subway: at Karasuma Oike
- Website: www.bunpaku.or.jp/en/

Kyoto Museums Four
- National Museum of Modern Art, Kyoto; Kyoto National Museum; Kyoto Municipal Museum of Art; Museum of Kyoto

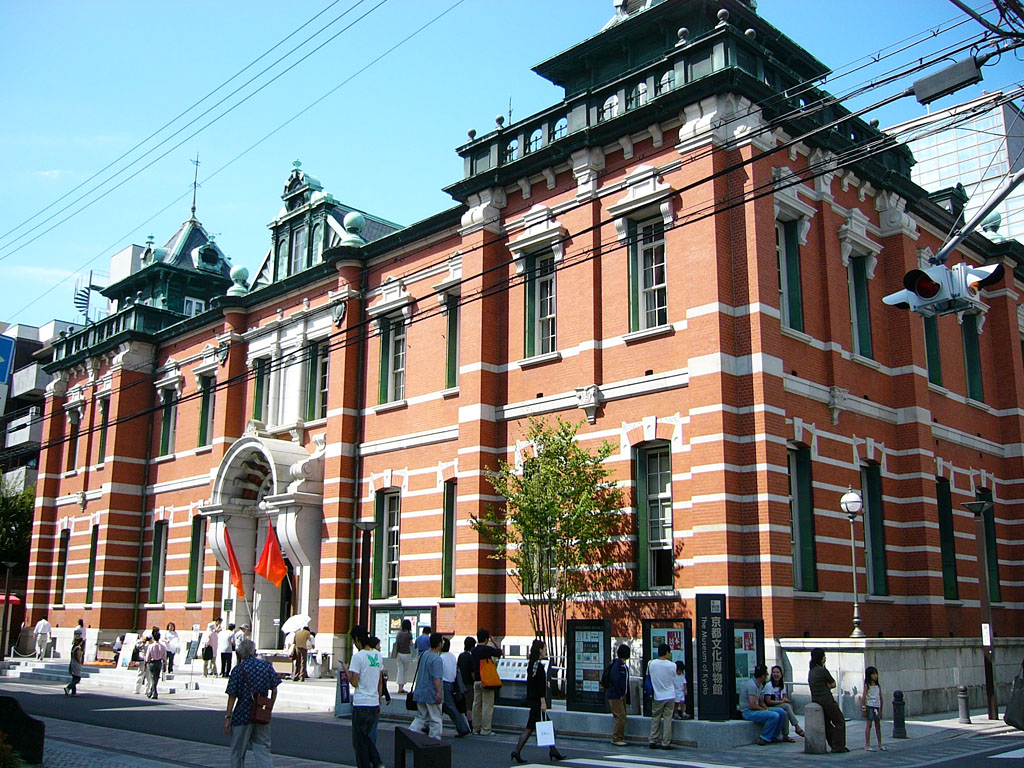
Annex

The Museum of Kyoto (京都文化博物館, Kyōto Bunka Hakubutsukan) is a museum of the history and culture of Kyoto.

== History ==
The Heian Museum of Ancient History, the former museum of the Museum of Kyoto was established in 1967. It was a private museum under the academic organization, "Kodaigaku Kyōkai" (Paleological Association of Japan). The museum opened in May 1968, and the main building was transferred from the Kyoto branch, Bank of Japan to the Association. The director was a historian, Bunei Tsunoda, and the museum was a research museum at that time with academic posts similar to those at a university.

In 1986, Kyoto Prefecture planned to establish a new museum, and it is the present Museum of Kyoto.

== Building and facilities ==
The annex served as the Heian Museum of Ancient History until 1986. It was designed by Tatsuno Kingo and Uheiji Nagano as the former Bank of Japan Kyoto Branch and designated as Important Cultural Property of Japan in 1969.
