= Tatsu Hirota =

Japanese artist (1904–1990)

Tatsu Hirota (広田 多津, Hirota Tatsu; 10 May 1904 – 23 November 1990) was a Japanese painter.

Tatsu Hirota was born in Kyoto, Japan, where she lived until her death in 1990. Hirota is best known for her paintings of jinbutsu (figure painting). She is widely noted for her paintings of nudes and maiko girls.

== Early life ==
Although she grew up in a very poor family, Hirota loved to paint as a child and by the age of 12 had decided that she wanted to become a painter. She began to pursue her ambition. After beginning her studies with one painter and feeling as though she wasn't learning much, she opted for a change. Hirota's second master was Kainosho Kusune, who later introduced her to Takeuchi Seihō (1864-1942), Kyoto's most famous painter at the time, in the 1930s. Later Nishiyama Suishō (1879-1958) began teaching her.

During this time she met her husband-to-be, Kuma Mukai, who was also studying as a painter under Nishiyama. The couple had two children, a son, and a daughter.

== Career ==
She exhibited and thrice won top prizes at the Nitten and Shin-Bunten. In 1974 she became a member of The Creative Painting Society, Soga-kai in 1974. Many museums in Japan house her works, with others in private collections.

Hirota is largely credited for introducing the nude as art to the mainstream in Japan. Nudes were dismissed with disdain before that time. While Hirota was actively painting for some years prior, she completed her first nude piece, aptly titled Nude in 1951.

Female subjects were the primary focus of her work and many of them in traditional Japanese dress with vibrant colors. From the 1970s until her death in 1990, she produced many works that were reproduced in art books, including one dedicated to only her works.

She enjoyed painting maiko as independent humans, not as accessories or as if they belonged to men.

She continued to paint up until a few days before her death in 1990.
