= Hashimoto Kansetsu =

Japanese painter

- 橋本関雪
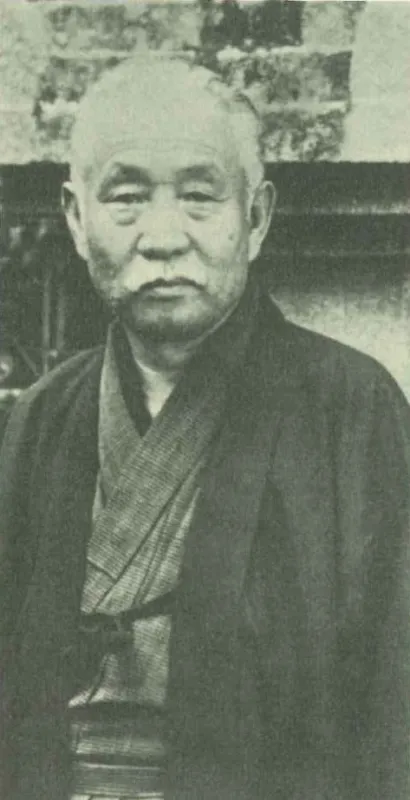
- Born: November 10, 1883; Kobe
- Died: February 26, 1945 (aged 61)
- Occupation: Artist

Hashimoto Kansetsu (橋本関雪, November 10, 1883 – February 26, 1945) was a Japanese nihonga painter who was active in the Kyoto art world during the Showa and Taisho periods.

== Life ==
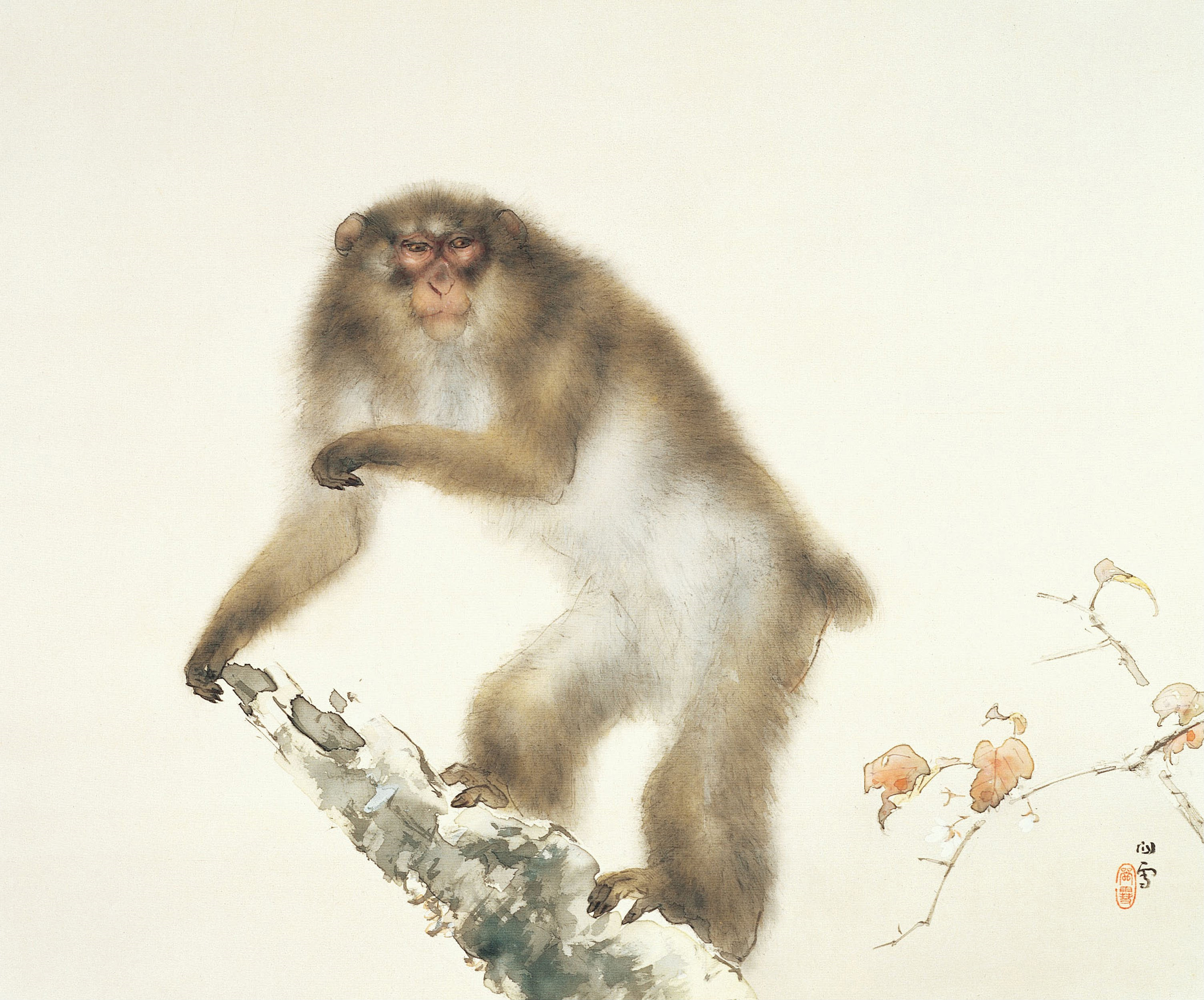
Old Monkey with Cherry in Autumn (1938)

Born in Kobe, he was the son of the painter Hashimoto Kaikan, from whom he inherited a love of Chinese culture. He studied at Chikujokai, a private school established by the nihonga painter Takeuchi Seihō, but eventually withdrew due to differences of opinion. He also studied with Kimihiro Kataoka.

Many of Hashimoto's paintings were inspired by Chinese scenery or Chinese classical literature. In 1912 one of his paintings, "Remaining Snow", was purchased by the Imperial Household Agency, which raised his status as a professional artist. He purchased homes near Kobe and Kyoto. He visited Europe in 1921 and after that spent part of almost every year in China.

His former residence in Kyoto is now a museum of his work called the Hakusasonso (白沙村荘), or Hashimoto Kansetsu Memorial House.
