= Ayako Tsuru =

Ayako Tsuru (born 1941) is a contemporary Japanese artist from Mexico City. She studied at the National Institute of Fine Arts (San Carlos Academy) from 1959 to 1963, before moving on to the International Summer Academy of Fine Arts of Salzburg, Austria in 1968, and the Kyoto National Museum of Modern Art in Kyoto from 1970 to 1971.

== Early years ==
Ayako Tsuru was born in Mexico City on October 23, 1941. Her parents were Mihoko Kayaba and Dr.Kiso Tsuru, a prominent Japanese doctor who lived in Mexico from the early 1930s. Since Tsuru was born during World War II her parents were concerned about the family and her health so they sent her to Dr. Tsuru's ranch in Ciudad Valles, San Luis Potosi where she went to school and was kept safe during the war years.

== Art studies ==
Her major teachers were Armando Lopez Carmona and David Alfaro Siqueiros, from whom she would get special talks on the subject by the mural art. She majored as a mural artist at the San Carlos Academy from 1959 to 1963.

== Professional work ==
She then became a teacher of vitreous enamels at the National Museum of Cultures in Mexico City. In 1970 she traveled to Tokyo, Japan, where she studied under Japanese Arts teacher Shigeo Iwazawa, and later did an exhibition by personal permission from Master Arts teacher Insho Domoto.

== Exhibitions ==
- National School of Arts (UNAM): Oil painting and Enamels; Mexico City, Mexico. 1967
- Isidro Fabela Cultural center: Enamels; Mexico City, Mexico. 1967
- School of Arts and Crafts: Mural paintings and Enamels; Mexico City, Mexico. 1967
- Cultural Center of Acapulco: oil painting; Acapulco, Mexico. 1968
- The International summer Academy of Fine Arts of Salzburg: Modern Jewellery (Goldsmith); Salzburg, Austria. 1968
- The National Museum of Cultures: Modern Jewellery, Vitreous Enamels and Mural Painting; Mexico City, Mexico. 1969
- The Art Gallery of Mexico City: Oil Painting, water color; Mexico. 1970
- Kyoto National Museum of Modern Art: Japanese inks, oil painting; Kyoto, Japan. 1972
- IFAL The French Institute of Latin America: Mexico City, Mexico. 1973
- The Cultural center of Israel: Mexico City, Mexico. 1974.

== Artwork in museums ==
- Museum of Art of Plovdiv, Bulgaria.
- Museum of Art of Morelia, Michoacan, Mexico (August 17, 1971)
