= Takeuchi Seihō =

Japanese painter

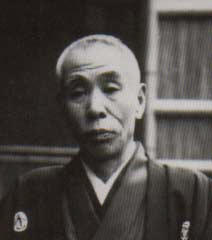
- Takeuchi Seihō, c. 1930
- Born: Takeuchi Tsunekichi; December 20, 1864; Kyoto, Japan
- Died: August 23, 1942 (aged 77); Kanagawa Prefecture, Japan
- Known for: Painter
- Movement: Nihonga
- Awards: Order of Culture

Takeuchi Seihō (竹内 栖鳳; /takeɯᵝtɕiseːhoː/) (December 20, 1864 – August 23, 1942) was a Japanese painter of the Nihonga genre, active from the Meiji through the early Shōwa period. One of the founders of nihonga, his works spanned half a century and he was regarded as master of the prewar Kyoto circle of painters. His real name was Takeuchi Tsunekichi (竹内 恒吉; /takeɯᵝtɕitsɯᵝnekʲitɕi/).

== Biography ==
Seihō was born in Kyoto. As a child, he loved to draw and wanted to become an artist. He was a disciple of Kōno Bairei of the Maruyama-Shijō school of traditional painting. In 1882, two of his works received awards at the Naikoku Kaiga Kyoshinkai (Domestic Painting Competition), one of the first modern painting competitions in Japan, which launched him on his career.

During the Exposition Universelle in Paris (1900), he toured Europe, where he studied Western art. After returning to Japan he established a unique style, combining the realist techniques of the traditional Japanese Maruyama–Shijo school with Western forms of realism borrowed from the techniques of Turner and Corot. This subsequently became one of the principal styles of modern Nihonga. His favorite subjects were animals -often in amusing poses, such as a monkey riding on a horse. He was also noted for his landscapes.

From the start of the Bunten exhibitions in 1907, Seihō served on the judging committee. In 1909 he became a professor at the Kyoto Municipal College of Painting (the forerunner to the Kyoto City University of Arts). Seihō also established his own private school, the Chikujokai. Many of his students later went on to establish themselves as noted artists, including Tokuoka Shinsen and Uemura Shōen.

In 1913, Seihō was appointed as an Imperial Household Artist, and in 1919 was nominated to the Imperial Fine Arts Academy (帝国美術院, Teikoku Bijutsu-in). He was one of the first persons to be awarded the Order of Culture when it was established in 1937.

He initially used the characters 棲鳳 for the first name of his pseudonym, and this name was possibly pronounced as Saihō.

== Important works ==
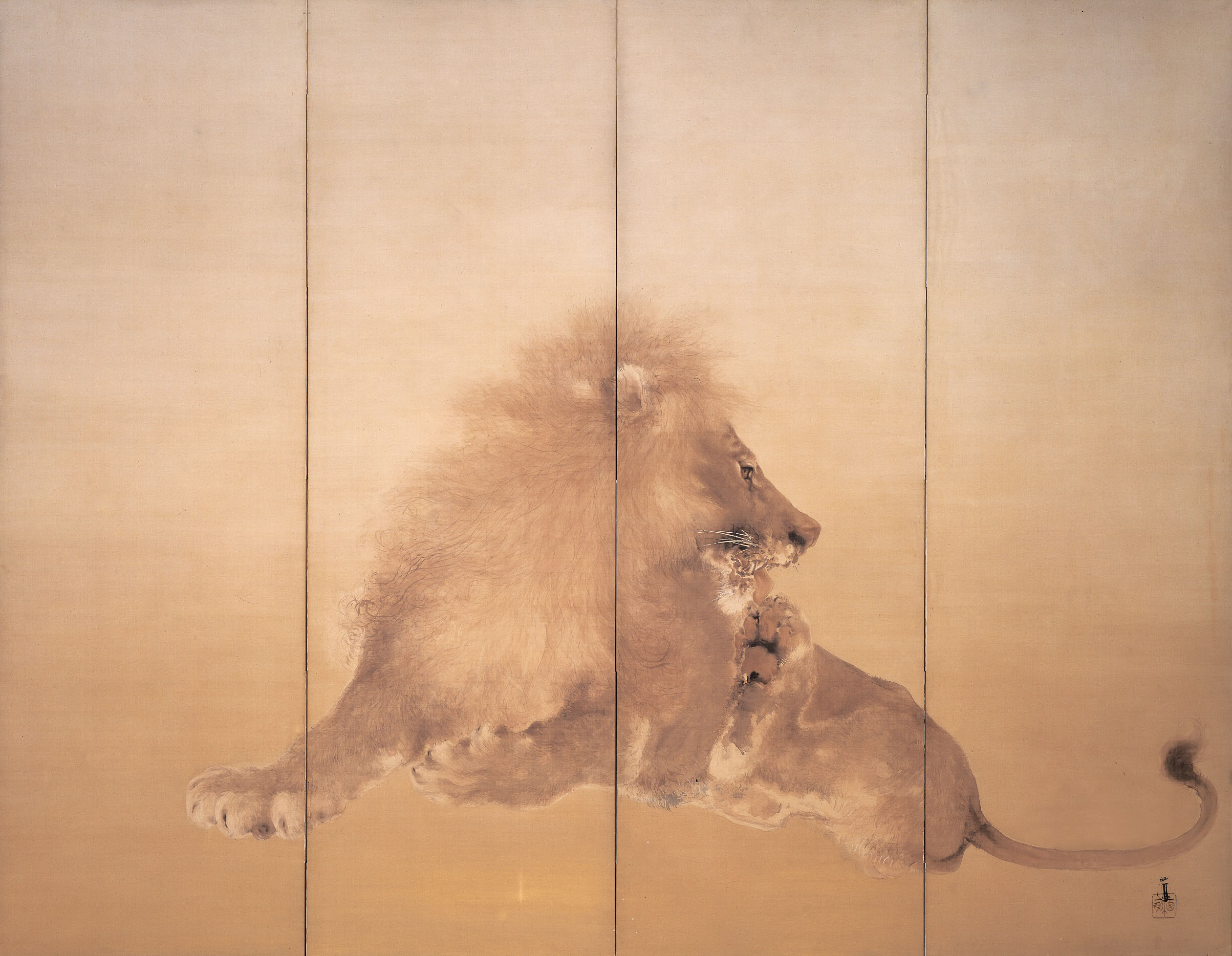
Lion (1901)

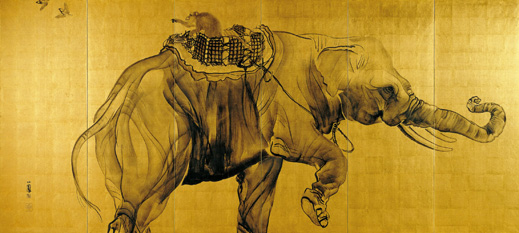
Elephants (1904)

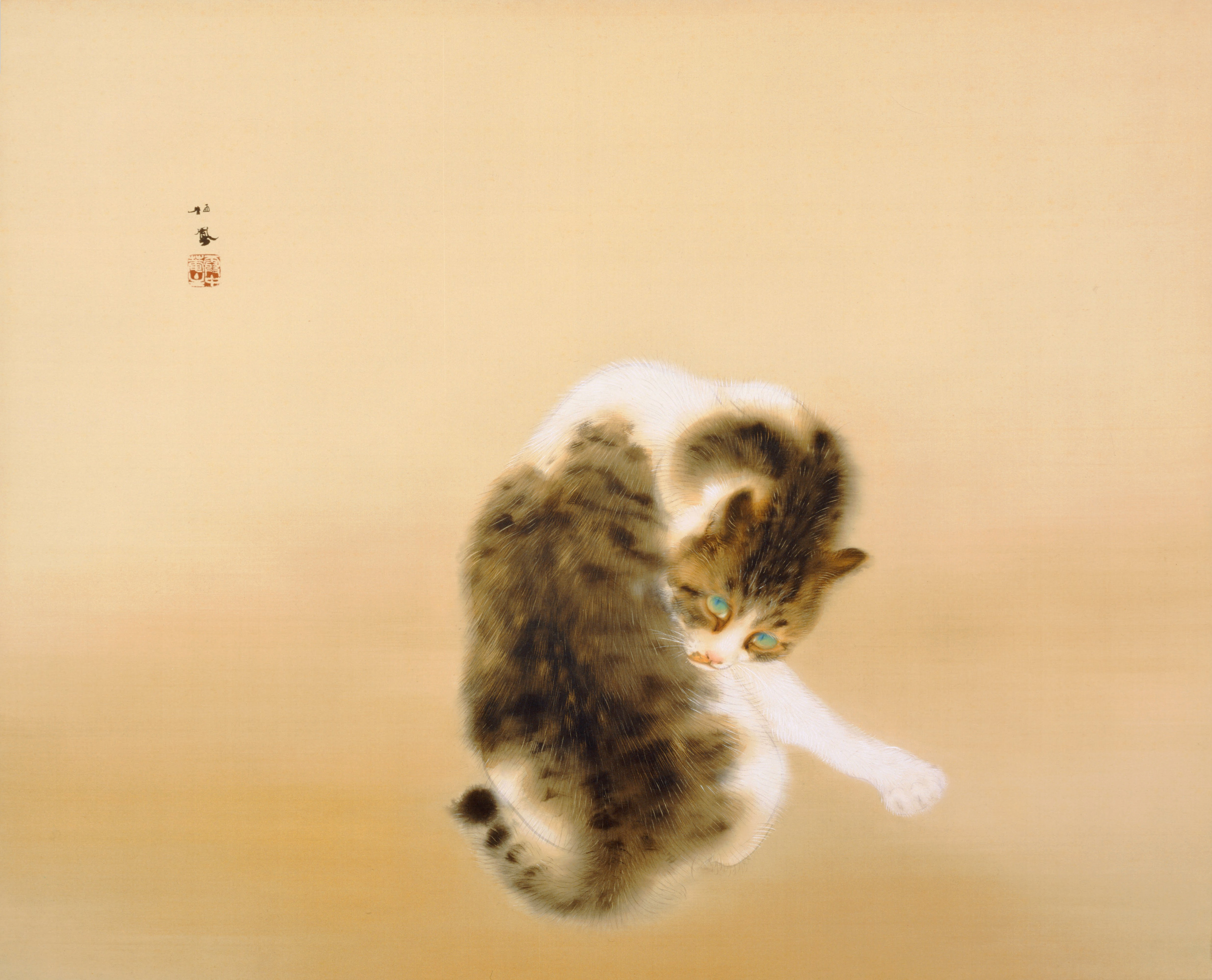
Tabby Cat (1924)

Due to his travels in Europe, he was exposed to a number of western styles and ideas. Visiting Dresden Zoo, he was able to see a lion for the first time and painted it for one of his screens. Another work were two panels of elephants. Later in his life he returned to more traditional Japanese motifs and painted smaller animals such as cats and fish.

- 斑猫 (1924, Yamatane Museum, Important Cultural Property)
- 平家驚禽声逃亡 Tokyo National Museum)
- 秋興 (1927, Kyoto National Museum of Modern Art)
- 絵になる最初 (1913, Kyoto Municipal Museum of Art)
- 薫風稚雀・寒汀白鷺 (1928, Museum of the Imperial Collections)
- 群鵜 (1913, Kachu'an Takeuchi Seiho Memorial Gallery)
- アレ夕立に (1909, Takashimaya Archives)
- 雨霽 (1907, Tokyo National Museum of Modern Art)
- 大獅子図 (1902, Fujita Art Museum)
- 飼われたる猿と兎 (1908, National Museum of Modern Art, Tokyo)
- 絵になる最初 (1913, Kyoto Municipal Museum of Art)

== Notable pupils ==
- Tsuchida Bakusen
- Ono Chikkyō
- Nishimura Go'un (西村五雲)
- Hashimoto Kansetsu (橋本関雪)
- Uemura Shōen
- Nishiyama Suisho

== See also ==
- Seison Maeda (1885–1977), one of the leading Nihonga painters
- List of Nihonga painters
