= Kyoto Municipal Museum of Art =

Museum in Kyoto, Japan

Kyoto City Kyocera Museum of Art
- 京都市美術館

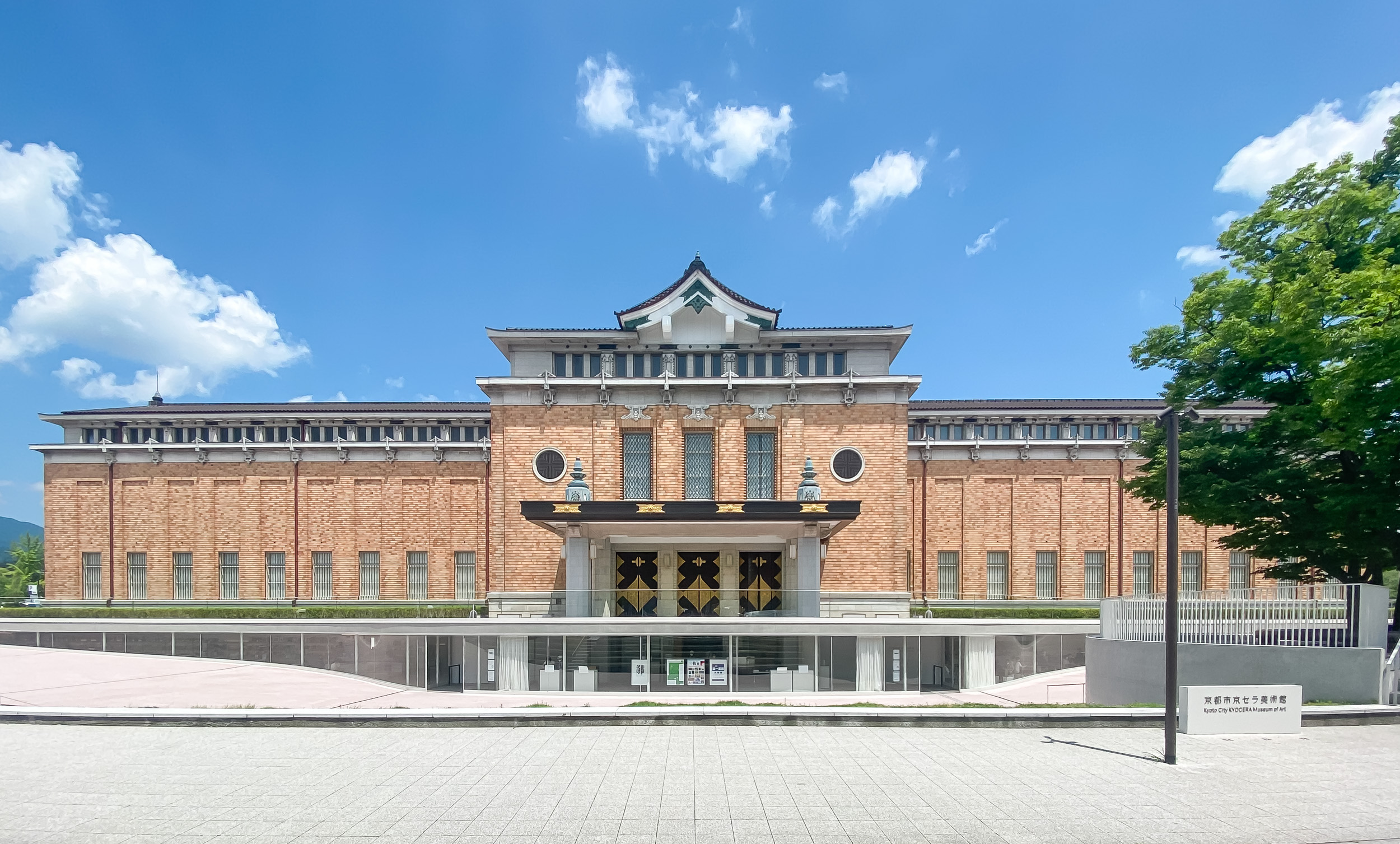

- Location of the museum Kyoto Municipal Museum of Art (Japan)
- Established: 1933
- Location: 124 Okazaki Enshōjichō, Sakyō-ku, Kyoto, Japan
- Coordinates: 35°00′46.21″N 135°47′00.85″E
- Type: Art museum
- Owner: Kyoto City
- Public transit access: Okazaki Koen / Bijutsukan, Heian Jingu-mae, Kyoto City Bus; Higashiyama Station, Municipal Subway Tōzai Line
- Parking: Okazaki Koen Parking Lot (can be used for fee)
- Website: www.city.kyoto.jp/bunshi/kmma/en/

Kyoto Museums Four
- National Museum of Modern Art, Kyoto; Kyoto National Museum; Kyoto Municipal Museum of Art; Museum of Kyoto

The Kyoto City Kyocera Museum of Art (京都市京セラ美術館) is located in Okazaki Park in Sakyō-ku Kyoto. Formerly Kyoto Municipal Museum of Art (京都市美術館, Kyōto-shi Bijutsukan), it is one of the oldest art museums in Japan. it opened in 1928 as Shōwa Imperial Coronation Art Museum of Kyoto, a commemoration of Emperor Hirohito's coronation.

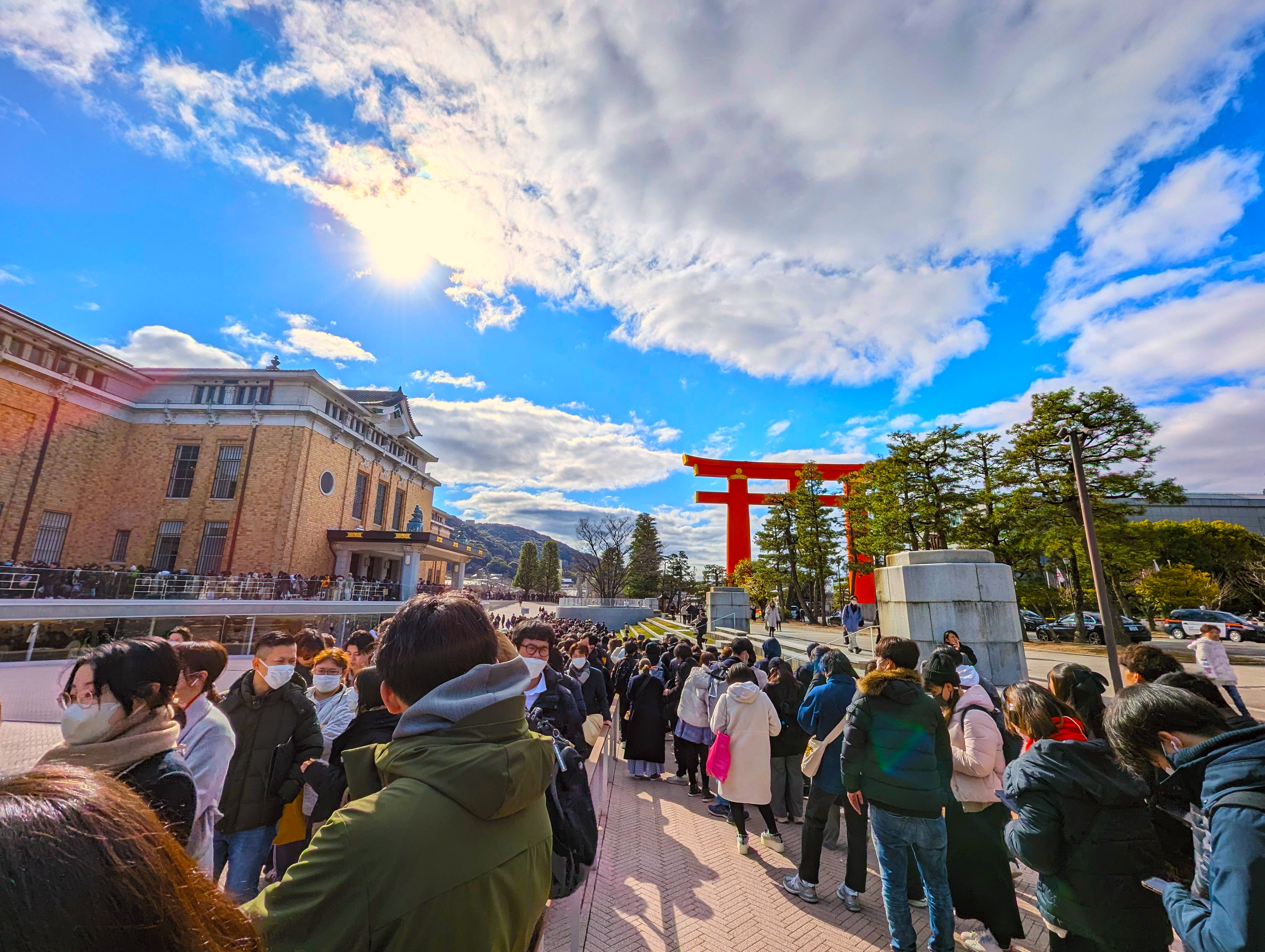
Crowds of people wait to enter the exhibition “Takashi Murakami Mononoke Kyoto” at the Kyoto City Kyocera Museum of Art, Kyoto, Japan (2024).

Upon renewal of the museum in 2020, Japanese multinational ceramics and electronics manufacturer Kyocera obtained the naming rights and the museum was renamed Kyoto City Kyocera Museum of Art.

== Important works in the collection ==
- Takeuchi Seihō: 芙蓉 (1882), 年中行事 (1886), 池塘浪静 (1887), 雲龍 (1887), 遊鯉 (1887), 宇野老人像 (1895), 渓山秋月 (1899), 散華 (1910), 散華 (1910), 熊 (1910), 雨 (1911), 絵になる最初 (1913), 金魚の句(1913), 潮沙永日 (1922), 酔興 (1924), 馬に乗る狐 (1924), うな辺 (1926), 雷公 (1930), 松 (1932), 水村 (1934), 風竹野 (1934), 風竹 (1934), 驟雨一過 (1935), 静閑 (1935), 雄風 (1940), 色紙十二ヶ月(1926–41), 八功徳水,冬瓜にねずみ

== Building information ==
- Planning: Kenjirō Maeda
- Completion of construction: 1933
- Total floor space: 9,349m²
- Mailing address: 〒606-8344 京都府京都市左京区岡崎円勝寺町124

== Access ==
- Kyoto Municipal Subway Tozai Line
  - Higashiyama Station
- Kyoto City Bus
  - Okazaki Koen / Bijutsukan, Heian Jingu-mae stop (Route 5, 46, 100, 110 and Kyoto Okazaki Loop)
  - Okazaki Koen / ROHM Theatre Kyoto, Miyakomesse-mae stop (Route 32)

== Surroundings ==
- Okazaki Park
  - The National Museum of Modern Art, Kyoto
  - Kyoto Municipal Zoo
  - Heian Shrine
  - ROHM Theatre Kyoto
  - Miyakomesse
  - Kyoto Prefectural Library
- Chion-in
