= Chiso =

Traditional Japanese textile producer

Chiso Co., Ltd.
- Native name: 千總
- Industry: Textile
- Founded: 1555
- Headquarters: 80 Mikura-cho Sanjo Karasuma Nishiiru, Nakagyō-ku, 604-8166 Kyoto, Japan
- Key people: Sohzaemon Nishimura (CEO)
- Number of employees: about 95
- Website: www.chiso.co.jp/english

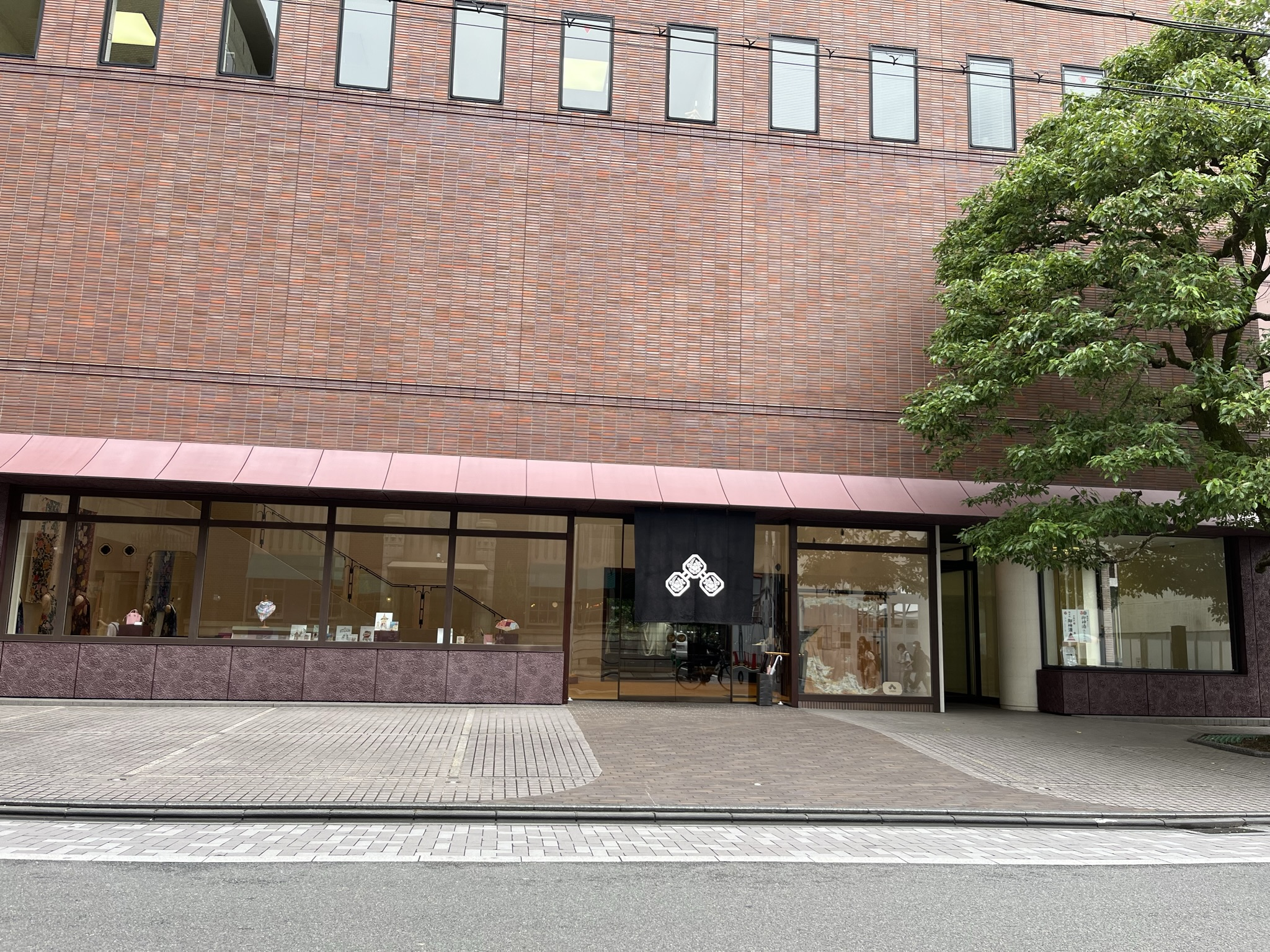
Chiso main entrance

Chiso Co., Ltd. (Japanese: 千總) is the oldest textile producer in the world. It was founded in 1555 in Kyoto, Japan.

Chisō specializes in Kyoto-style yūzen (京友禅) coloring. It is located in the Nishijin district of Kyoto. Chiso produces many styles of kimono. Its clients include the royal family members Empress Michiko, Princess Akishino, etc.

The company created the Chiso Gallery containing the collection of about 20,000 items of historic fabrics, books, paintings, etc.

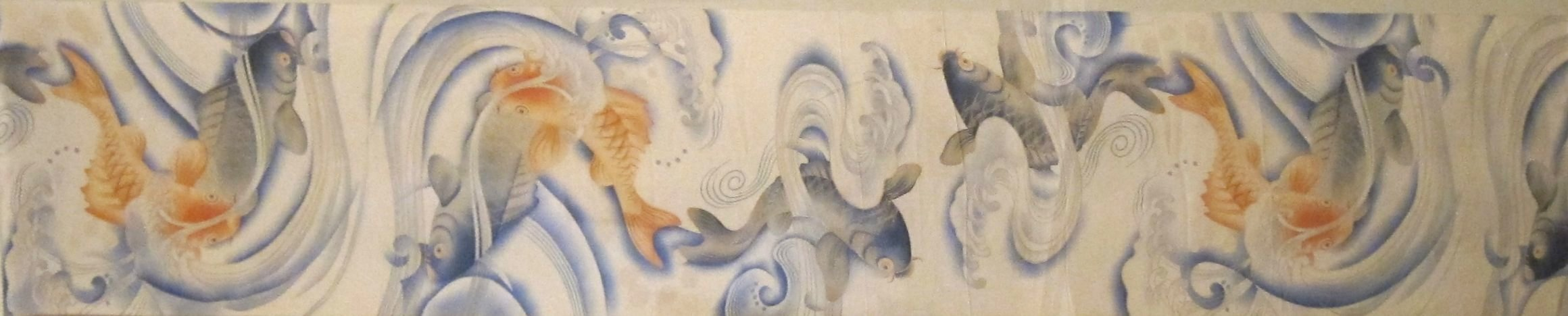
Painted kimono fabric by Chisō

== See also ==
- List of oldest companies
