= Kyoto National Museum =

Art museum in Kyoto, Japan

- 京都国立博物館
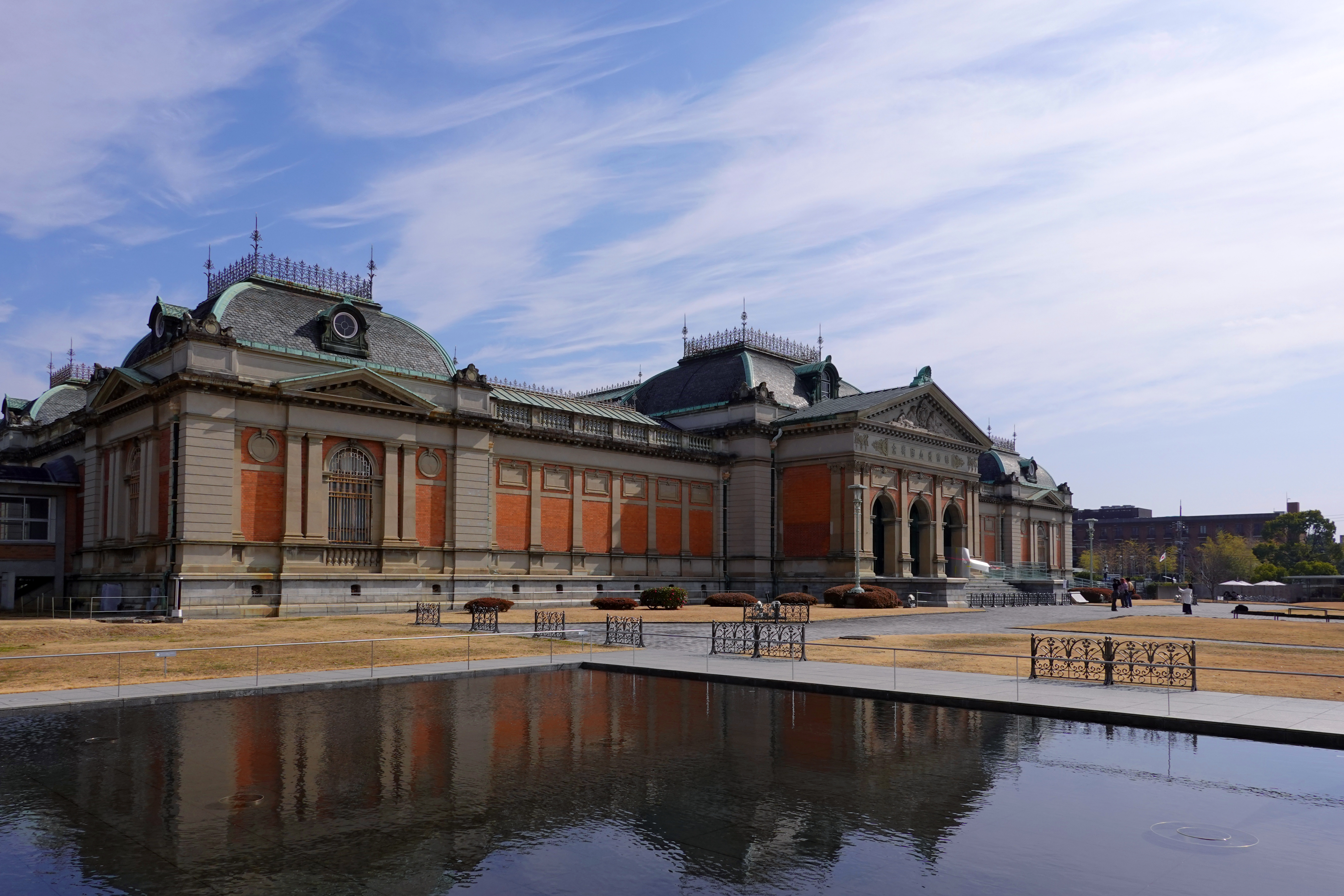
- Façade of museum

- Location of the museum Kyoto National Museum (Japan)
- Established: May 1897
- Location: Higashiyama-ku, Kyoto, Japan
- Coordinates: 34.99°N 135.773°E
- Type: Art museum
- Visitors: 384,340 (2016)
- Public transit access: Shichijō Station, Keihan Main Line
- Website: www.kyohaku.go.jp/eng/

Kyoto Museums Four
- National Museum of Modern Art, Kyoto; Kyoto National Museum; Kyoto Municipal Museum of Art; Museum of Kyoto

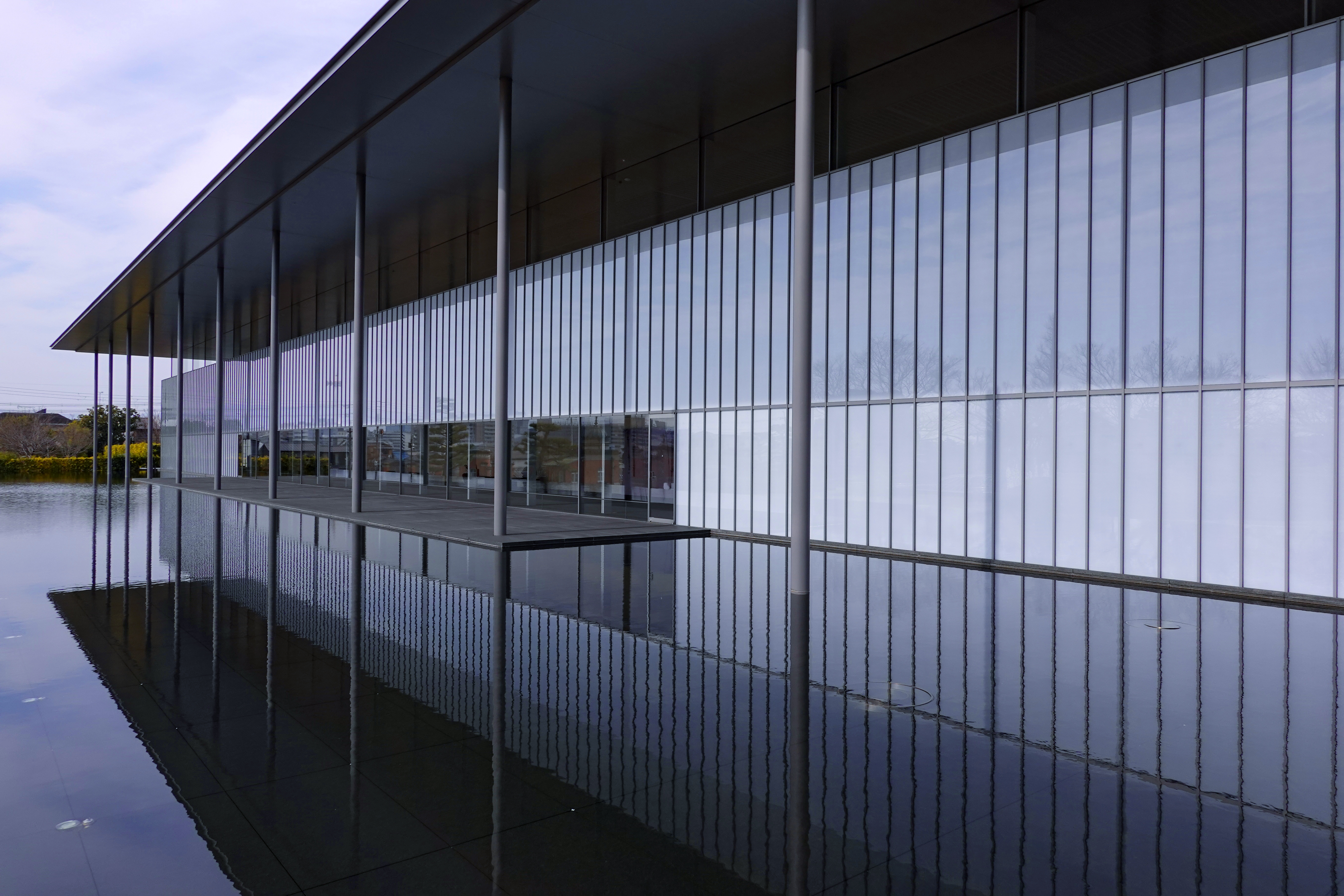
Heisei Chishinkan Wing

The Kyoto National Museum (京都国立博物館, Kyōto Kokuritsu Hakubutsukan) is one of the major art museums in Japan. Located in Kyoto's Higashiyama ward, the museum focuses on pre-modern Japanese and Asian art.

== History ==
The Kyoto National Museum, then the Imperial Museum of Kyoto, was proposed, along with the Imperial Museum of Tokyo (Tokyo National Museum) and the Imperial Museum of Nara (Nara National Museum), in 1889, and construction on the museum finished in October 1895. The museum was opened in 1897. The museum went through a series of name changes, in 1900 changing its name to the Imperial Household Museum of Kyoto, and once more in 1924 to the Imperial Gift Museum of Kyoto. The current name, the Kyoto National Museum, was decided upon in 1952.

=== Timeline ===
The growth and development of today's museum has been an evolving process: history

- 1897—Museum is established as the "Imperial Museum of Kyoto."
- 1900—Museum is renamed the "Imperial Household Museum of Kyoto."
- 1924—Museum is donated to City of Kyoto; and Museum is renamed the "Imperial Gift Museum of Kyoto."
- 1952—Committee for the Preservation of Cultural Properties (national government) assumes responsibility for Museum collections; and Museum is renamed "Kyoto National Museum."
- 1966—Collection Hall is completed.
- 1969—Special Exhibition Hall, Main Gate, ticket booth, and fences are designated "Important Cultural Properties" under the name of the former "Imperial Museum of Kyoto."
- 1973—Saturday Lecture Series, 1st session is held.
- 1979—Conservation Center for Cultural Properties is completed.
- 2001—South Gate is constructed as a part of a project for the 100th Year Anniversary Hall.
- 2001—Museum is renamed the "Kyoto National Museum" of the "Independent Administrative Institution National Museum" (IAI National Museum).
- 2005—IAI National Museum is expanded with addition of Kyushu National Museum.
- 2007—IAI National Museum is merged into Independent Administrative Institution National Institutes for Cultural Heritage (NICH), combining the four national museums with the former National Institutes for Cultural Preservation at Tokyo and Nara

== Layout ==
The museum consists of several buildings, the most prominent being the Special Exhibition Hall (Main Exhibition Hall), designed by Katayama Tōkuma in 1895, and The Collections Hall (New Exhibition Hall), designed in 1966 by Morita Keiichi. In September 2014, the museum completed renovations on a new permanent collections hall, the Heisei Chishinkan Wing (The Collections Galleries), designed by Yoshio Taniguchi, known for his redesign of the Museum of Modern Art in New York and his design of the Gallery of Hōryū-ji Treasures at the Tokyo National Museum.

The regular exhibitions are shown in The Collections Galleries, while the Special Exhibition Hall is used for special exhibits. The Main Exhibition Hall, the Main Gate, and the Ticket Area have all been designated as Important Cultural Properties in Japan.

== Museum Collections ==
The museum was originally built to house and display art treasures privately owned by temples and shrines, as well as items donated by the Imperial Household Ministry. Currently, most all of the items in the museum are more or less on permanent loan from one of those places.

The museum focuses on mainly pre-modern Japanese works (it is said to have the largest collection of Heian period artifacts) and Asian art. The museum is also well known for its collections of rare and ancient Chinese and Japanese sutras. Other famous works include senzui byōbu (landscape screen) from the 11th century, and the gakizōshi (Scroll of Hungry Ghosts) from the 12th century.

The museum is divided into three parts:

- Fine Arts, including sculptures, paintings and works of calligraphy;
- Handicrafts, including pottery, fabrics, lacquerwares and metalworks;
- Archaeology, including objects of archaeological and historical interest.

Altogether, the museum houses over 12,000 works, of which around 6,000 are on display at the museum. The museum also boasts photographic archives containing over 200,000 photographic negatives and color transparencies. In the Fine Arts collections alone, there are more than 230 pieces that have been designated as either National Treasures or Important Cultural Properties.

== See also ==
- List of National Treasures of Japan (ancient documents)
- List of National Treasures of Japan (archaeological materials)
- List of National Treasures of Japan (crafts-others)
- List of National Treasures of Japan (crafts-swords)
- List of National Treasures of Japan (paintings)
- List of National Treasures of Japan (writings)
