= Kiso Tsuru =

Kiso Tsuru (都留 競, Tsuru Kisō) (1894 – November 23, 1966), was a Japanese philanthropist who lived in Mexico most of his life and made many contributions to the economies of both Japan and Mexico during the 20th century. Mr. Tsuru helped to build Japanese neighborhoods and schools and created jobs for Mexicans. He mainly practised medicine and helped to lower the mortality rate of the Mexican people as well as the Japanese in Mexico.

== Early life ==
Tsuru was born on April 20, 1894, in Usa District in Kyushu, Japan. His parents were Toma and Shimo Tsuru who were local farmers in Usa. He was one of nine children. According to Shinto beliefs it was a special day - the day he was born, he was to become the next High Priest for the Usa Shrine and at 13 years old would join their monastery, however when he reached the age of 13 to start his monastic studies he decided that his life was for adventure and to help others in the field, not to live a monastic life. He did his early schooling in Ōita and he went to Osaka for College and studied Industry and Commerce, Then went to the Faculty of Medicine at the University of Tokyo and studied at Yokohama at the Association of Immigrants where he specialized in Politics of Immigration.

In 1918 at the age of 24 he left Japan and went to Mexico City and began work as private secretary to the Minister of Interrelations between Mexico and Japan under Baron Fujitaro Ootori. A year later went back to Japan where he established in Yokohama his first company (Compania Mexicana de Comercio Exterior.) The Mexican company of Exterior Commerce.

In 1924 he went back to Japan and studied under Dr. Unshin Hirahara and obtained his licence to practice medicine. He then established himself in Ciudad Valles in the state of San Luis Potosí where he opened a pharmacy and a Medical Clinic. For his great initiative and Medical assistance, he was awarded by the governor of San Luis Potosí, (Saturnino Cedillo) "The Medical Doctor" of the Regional, Military, and all schools of the state. Although many of his clients were local Huastec natives, he also had many important people in the local Government, and of the Military. Other notable figures he cured of alignments were Jorge Prieto Laurens and General Juan Andreu Almazán.

== Life in Mexico ==
In 1926 he went back to Japan and married Mihoko Kayaba the daughter of a prominent lawyer and brought her to live with him in Mexico City. During their 40-year marriage they had nine children, all but one were born in Mexico. Between 1930–1940 he founded the International company of Medical Drugs(KSK) of Japan and Mexico. This was but one of his many interests and businesses. He also founded the petroleum company of Lagunas S.A., the petroleum company of Veracruz S.A., the mining company of Taxco S.A., where they mined large deposits of fluorite, The Tsuru mining company S.A. in Oaxaca where they mined the mineral mica. And in Japan established the petroleum company of the Pacific S.A., the Tsuru shrimping company and last but not least the international company of Commerce S.A., that dedicated to the exchange between Mexico and Japan. During the thirties he helped many important people of the National Government of Mexico such as Emilio Portes Gil, Pascual Ortiz Rubio, Abelardo L. Rodríguez and Lázaro Cárdenas with their problems ranging from economics, to agricultural, to Medical, but due to the watchful eye of the US Government at that time he was only known as the (Doctor Japonesito) little Japanese Doctor. In 1938 just before World War II he sent a large donation of money to the Navy and Army of Japan for the invasion of Manchuria, China, for which he was awarded with a certificate from the Minister of War of Japan Mr. Hajime Sugiyama.

== World War II ==
During the war most of his businesses were either sold or were taken over by the Mexican government. And what little money he had left, he used to create a society for the protection of the Japanese in Mexico and formed the first Japanese neighborhood (Colonia Japonesa) and fought to keep the Japanese out of Japanese internment camps and many of them were sent to live at one of two called,= Hacienda Temixco,(Morelos) and Rancho Batan, he also invited many of his Japanese friends to stay in his last lands he owned in San Luis Potosi, but due to its remoteness, they preferred to stay in Mexico City. He also donated money to the American Red Cross in Japan, as he wished to assist many Japanese. He also helped establish three Japanese public schools, the central school (Chuo-Gakuen), the Japanese school of Tlalpan and the Japanese school of Tacuba in Mexico city.

== After the war ==
He reorganized one of his last companies, The International Company of Commerce and used it to sell many medical pharmaceutical OTC, over the counter products such as Gotacilina, Polytamin, Vita Penicilina which later became the famous Latin American ointment Vitacilina. Later in between 1951–1956 he returned to Japan and began promoting commercial exchange between Mexico and Japan and worked to elevate the diplomatic missions to the rank of the Mexico-Japan embassies. With two of his friends (Hyodayu Shimanuki) and (Shigeshi Nagata) he helped to establish the Association of Rikko-kai in Mexico which helped the Japanese immigrants to emigrate to Latin America, which included teaching them Spanish. As he had been appointed the temporary ambassador to Japan during the war, he also helped to establish the first official ambassador (Mr. Kubota) between the Mexican President (Miguel Alemán) and Japan. He also helped to introduce the Prime Minister of Japan (Hayato Ikeda) to the Mexican President (Adolfo López Mateos), who welcomed him cordially as he was the first prime minister to visit Mexico after the War. During this time he also did projects to help the economy of the southeast of Mexico and organized The international company of Salt Industries S.A. in the zone of Salina Cruz Mexico.

== Later life ==
Then in 1960 due to his health, he went back to the few land holdings he had left in Ciudad Valles and began to grow agricultural products like mangoes, avocados and sugar cane. He experimented with making mango Hybrids Mango Miyako, that later became world famous and were the only farm at that time to export to Japan and Europe. He also saw that the people of this city and State San Luis Potosí were lacking education so he opened a rural public school on 29 April 1960. In the last years of his life Tsuru was still Advisor or founder of several companies such as the Tsuru Ranches, the International Company of Commerce S.A., the copper company of the Pacific S.A. and the Japanese films S.A. to name a few.

== Important people he met in life ==
Among the prominent people he knew and had many deals with were: Francisco León de la Barra, Porfirio Díaz, Michio Itō, Keiichi Ito, Michitaka Mishima, Jorge Prieto Laurence, Dr. Inazo Nitobe, Dr. Sawayanagi Seitaro, Seinosuke Ogita, Shizuo Kasai, Naokichi Kaneko, Masamichi Katsuda, Aizo Soma, Morie Ogiwara, Tsune Nakamura, Rash Behari Bose, Mitsuru Toyama, Sen Katayama, Tomitaro Watanabe, Roka Tokutomi, Yukichi Shiragami, Isoroku Yamamoto, Sōichirō Asano, Ginjirō Fujiwara, Aiichiro Fujiyama, Hayashi Fusao, Senjūrō Hayashi, Kōki Hirota, Taizō Ishizaka, Tsuyoshi Inukai, Masako Ichijo, Shōjirō Ishibashi, Hideo Kodama, Ichizō Kobayashi, Matajirō Koizumi, Saburō Kurusu, Shōzō Murata, Okawa Shumei, Mineo Ōsumi, Shigenobu Okuma, Prince Kuni Kuniyoshi, Eiichi Shibusawa, Makoto Saito, Kiichiro Toyoda, Korekiyo Takahashi, Giichi Tanaka, Chobei Takeda, Roan Ryōhei Uchida, Jōtarō Watanabe.

== Return to Japan ==
In October 1966 he went back to Japan where he spent his last days visiting his beloved country, until his death in November from a heart condition. He left behind over 30 family members including his wife, 8 children, 12 grandchildren and 5 great-grandchildren now living worldwide. One of his cousins was Shigeto Tsuru, a prominent Japanese economist.
