= Kuma Mukai =

Japanese painter

Kuma Mukai (向井 久万, Mukai Kuma; 14 December 1908 – 20 January 1987) was a Japanese painter born in Osaka Prefecture, Japan in 1908. He lived for some time in Kamakura before his death in Tokyo in 1987. He is well known for his paintings of nude women, Buddhist images, and floral designs.

== Early life ==
After he graduated one of the art colleges in Kyoto, he worked as a designer of Kimono texture for traditional Japanese clothes. He started to be a painter and taught by Nishiyama Suisho (1879-1958).

It was during this time that he met his wife-to-be, Tatsu Hirota, who was also studying as a painter under Nishiyama. The couple had two children, a son and a daughter.

== Career ==
He exhibited his painting of the birth of his son, "Dan-ji-umaru" and won a top prize at Shin-Bunten in 1941.

In 1974, he became a member of The Creative Painting Society, Soga-kai. Many of his works are in The Historical Museum of Izumisano city where he was born.

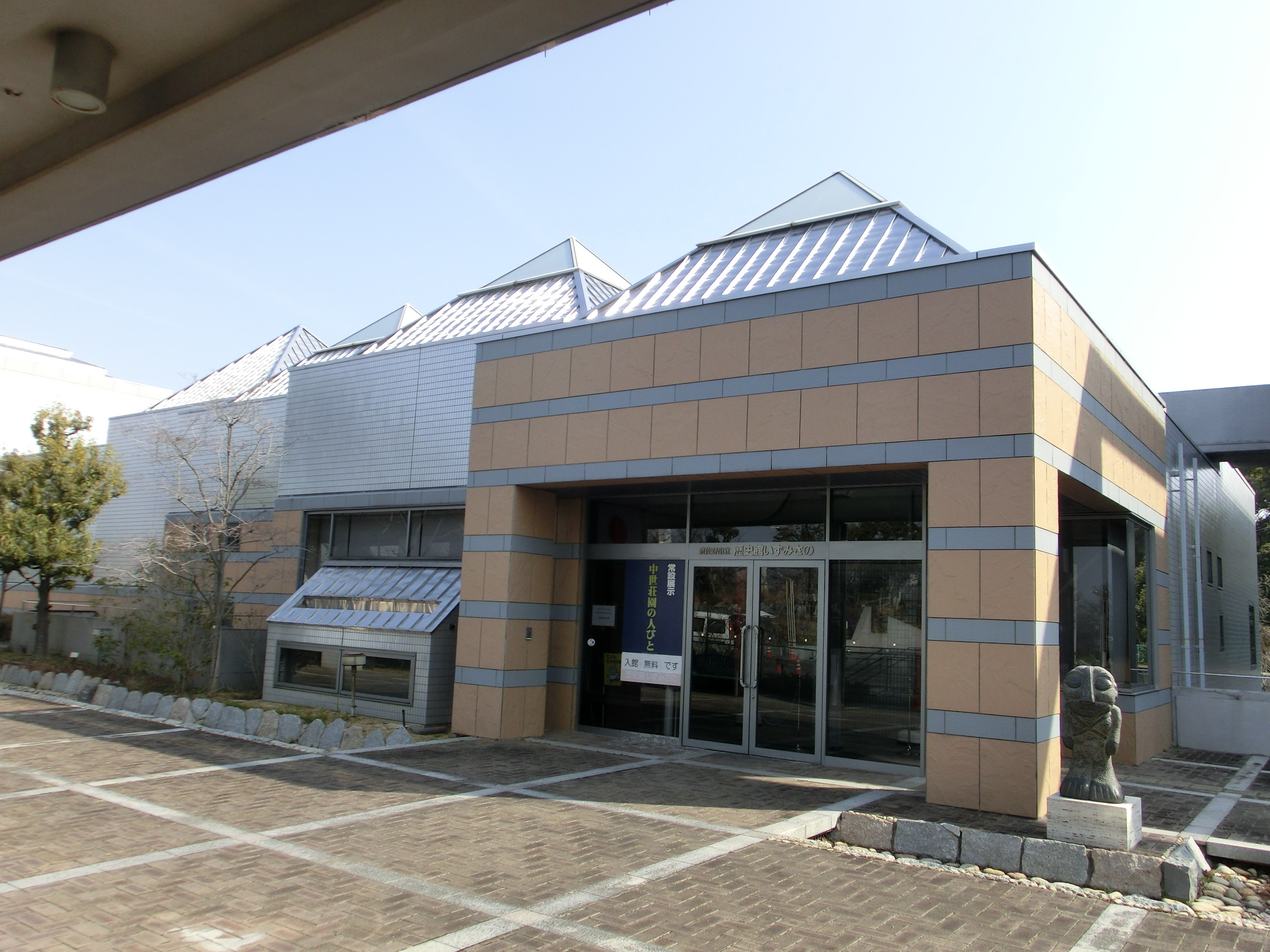
Izumisano History Museum

His paintings show the beauty of the human body. The Fuyu is famous and regarded as his best work. Kuma also produced beautiful floral designs in woodblock prints and silk.

Other Works by Kuma Mukai
