= Nakabayashi Chikutō =

Japanese painter

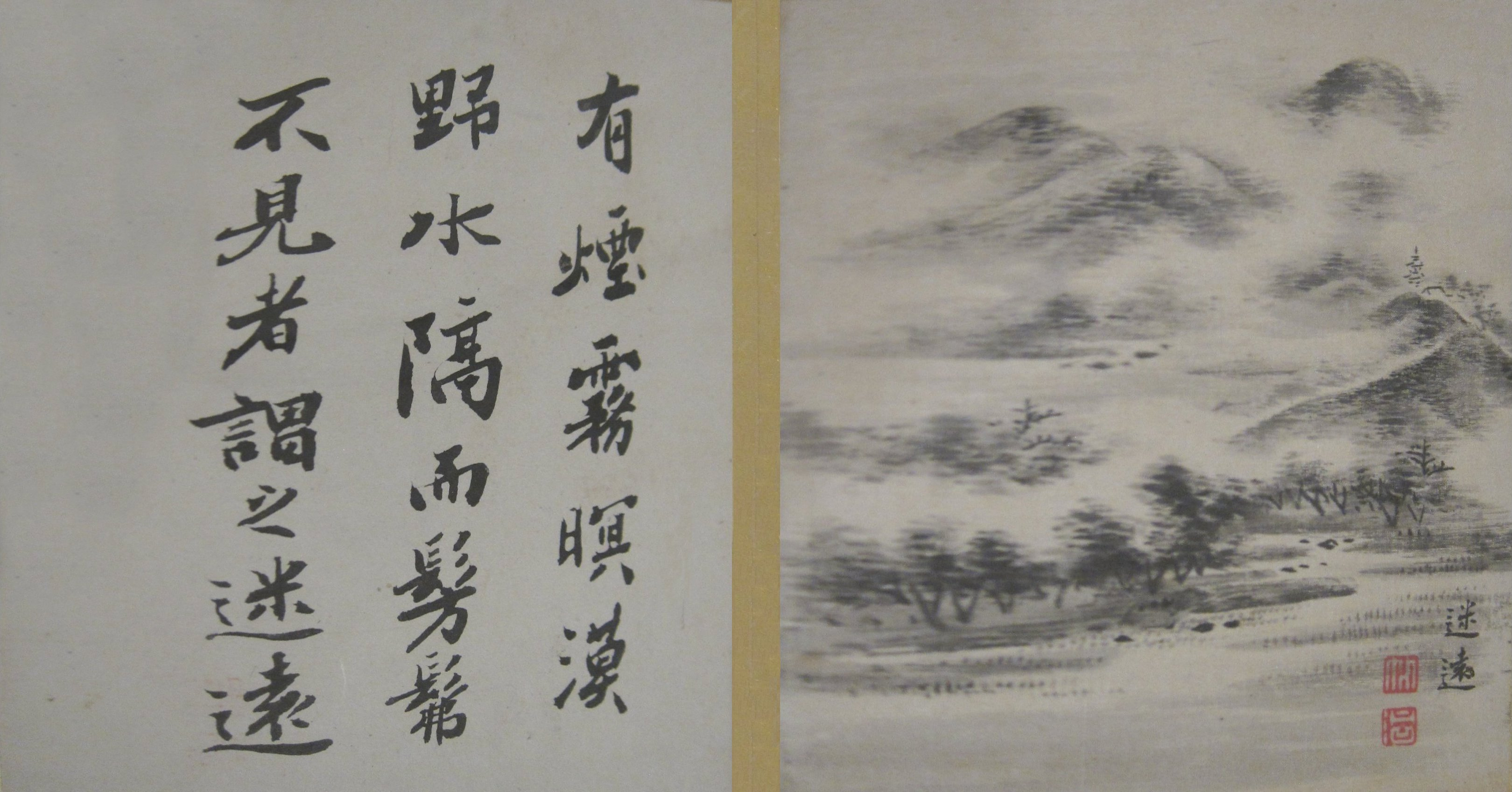
Landscape with Calligraphy, from a set of six

Nakabayashi Chikutō, originally Nariaki (Japanese:中林 竹洞; (1776, Nagoya - 27 April 1853, Kyoto) was a Japanese painter in the nanga style. His other art names include Chūtan (沖澹), Taigen’an (太原庵) and Tōzan Inshi (東山隠士).

== Life and work ==
He was the son of a doctor and displayed an interest in art at a very early age. At the age of fourteen, he and his friend Yamamoto Baiitsu (who was only seven) made the acquaintance of Kamiya Ten’yū (?-1803), a wealthy merchant who collected art and calligraphy and helped them pursue their artistic education. His first works were copies made from Kamiya's collection. He was especially influenced by ink drawings from the period of the Chinese Yuan Dynasty and the painting techniques of Ni Zan. At the age of twenty, he opened his own studio in a small temple.

After Kamiya's death, he and Baiitsu went to Kyoto to pursue an interest in classical literature and became members of the literary circle focused on the philosopher Rai San'yō and the nanga artist Uragami Shunkin. He continued his training there and, together with Uragami, he wrote and published an illustrated book on painting called Gadō kongōsho (画道金剛杵; roughly, "The Heavenly Art of Painting"). He would later compose other works on his own, including Chikutō garon (竹洞画論; "Chikutō's Painting") and Chikutō gakyō (竹洞画稿; "Chikutō's Sketching).

His son, Chikkei, also became a painter and worked in the Chinese Northern Style. His daughter Kiyomi created some works in the style of the Southern School.

His work is kept in several museums, including the Indianapolis Museum of Art, the Harvard Art Museums, the Los Angeles County Museum of Art, the Minneapolis Institute of Art, the Ashmolean Museum, the University of Michigan Museum of Art, and the Cleveland Museum of Art.

== Selected works ==
From the book Yūsai gafu (融斎画譜; "Picture Album"), published by Chikutō's students.

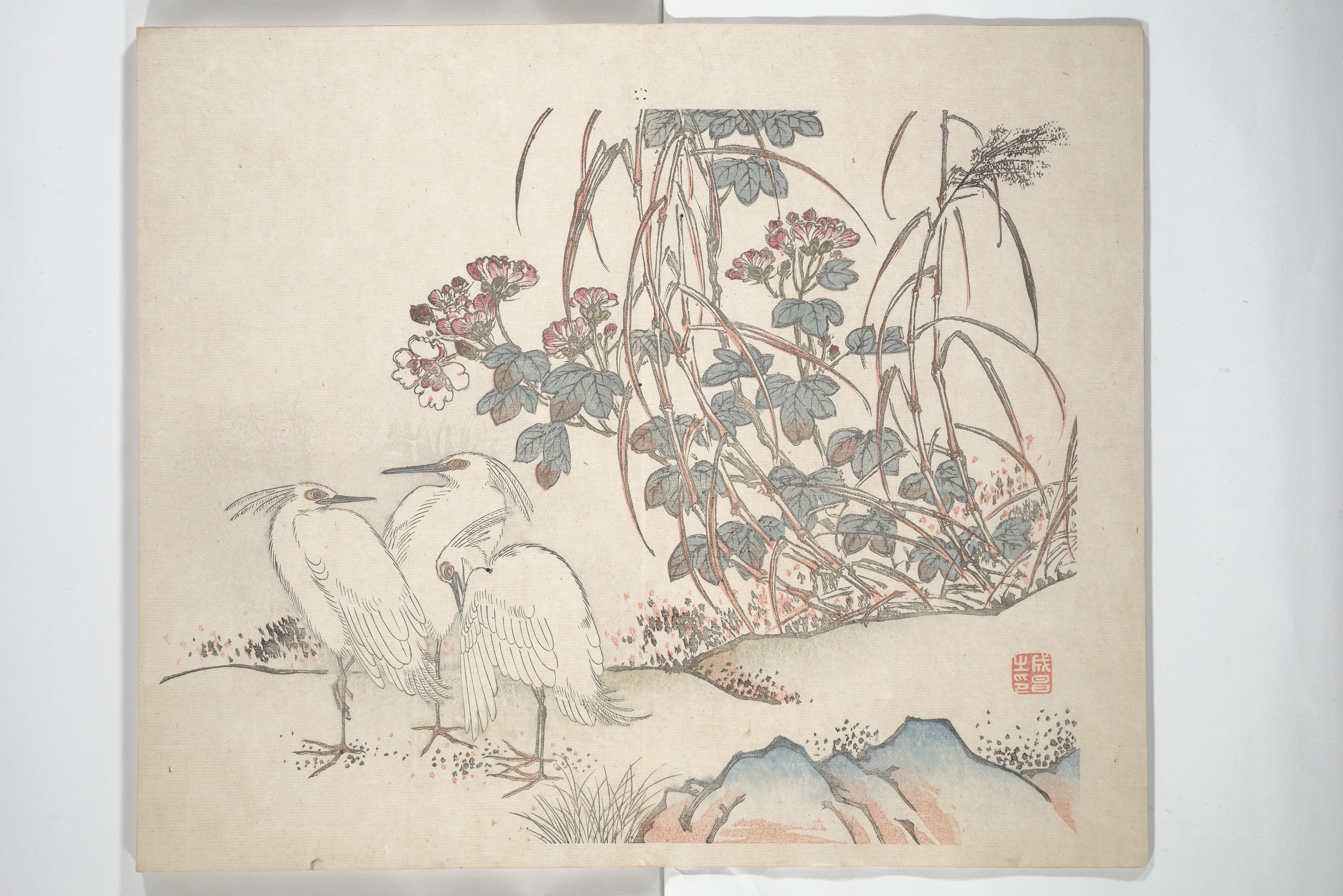

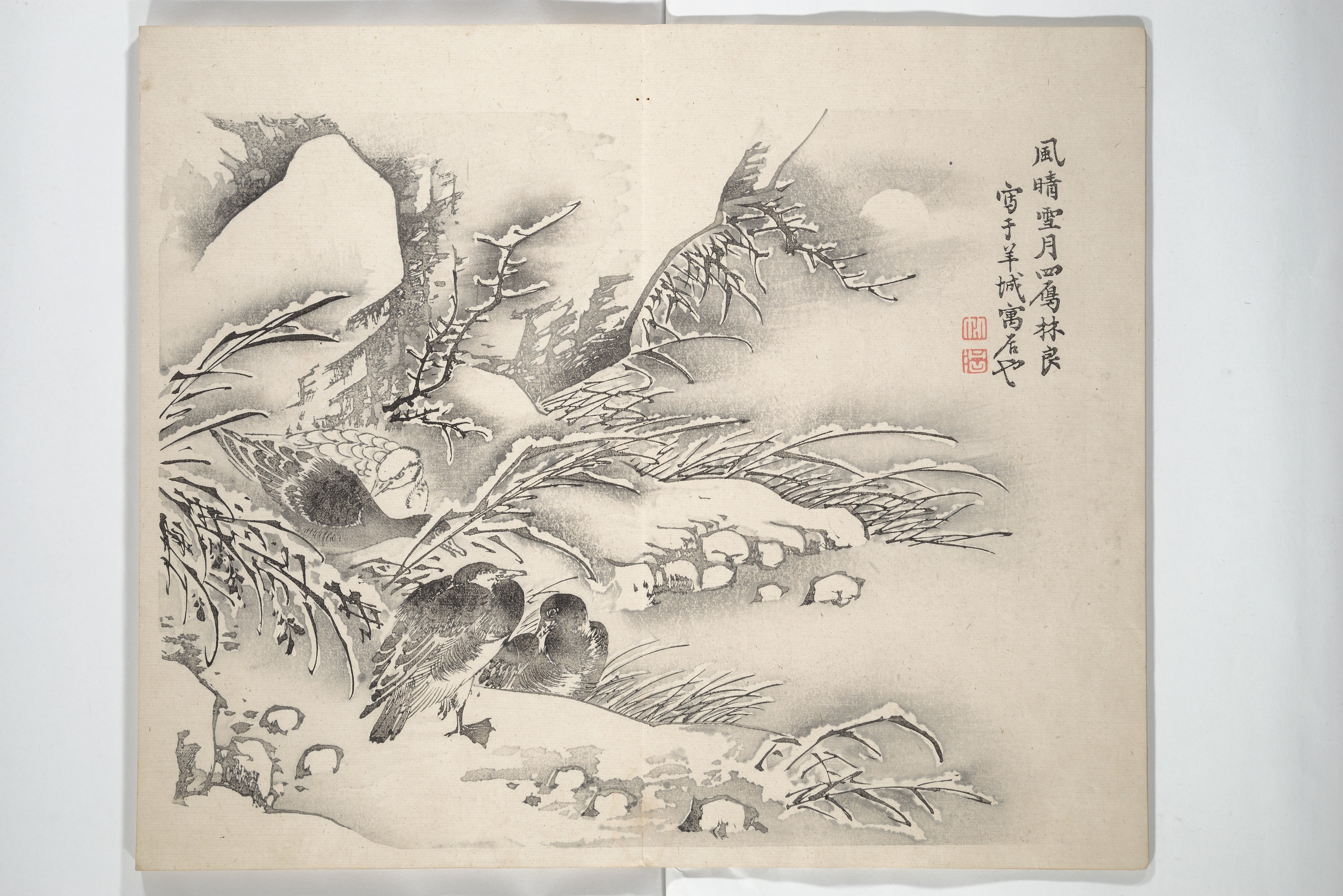

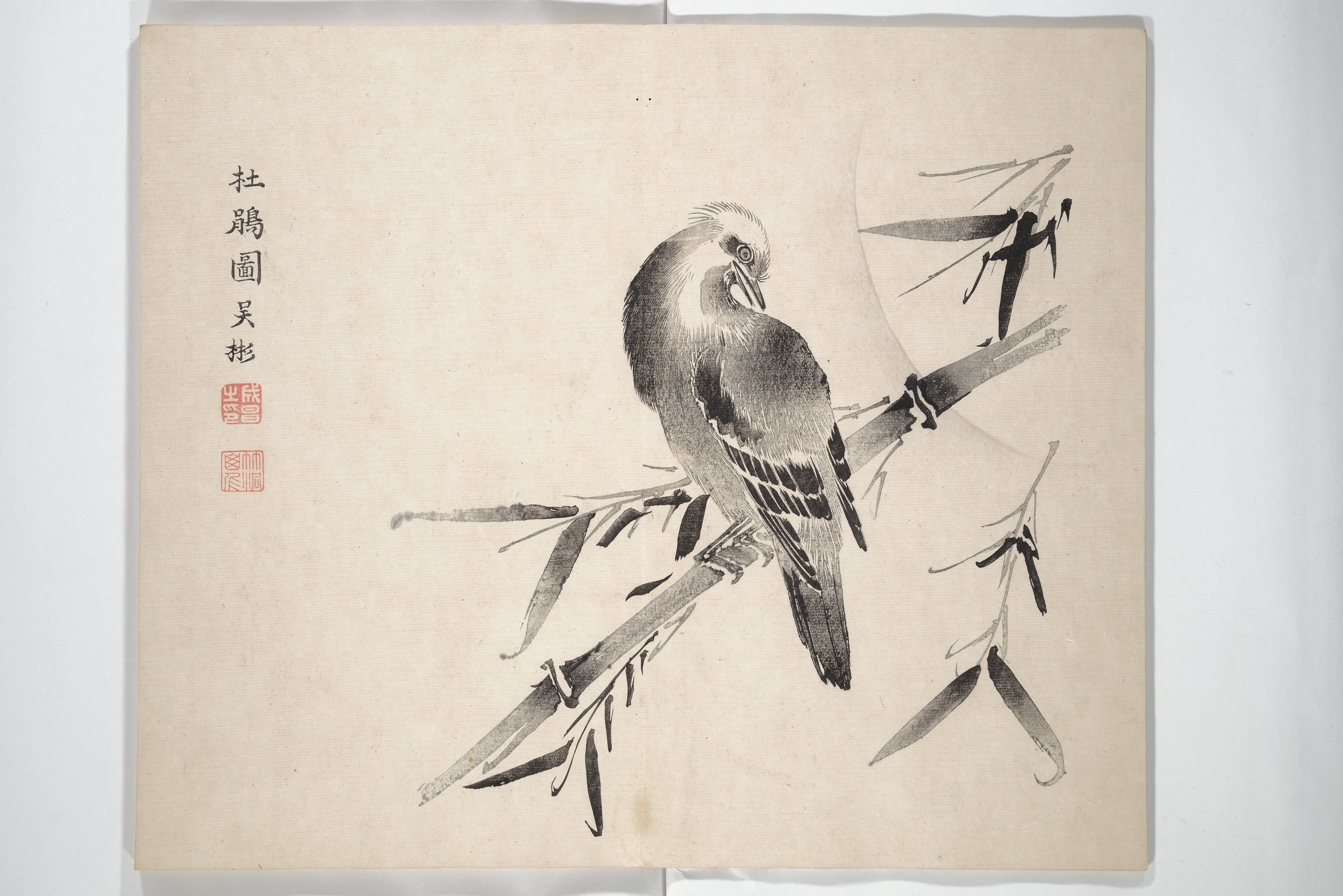

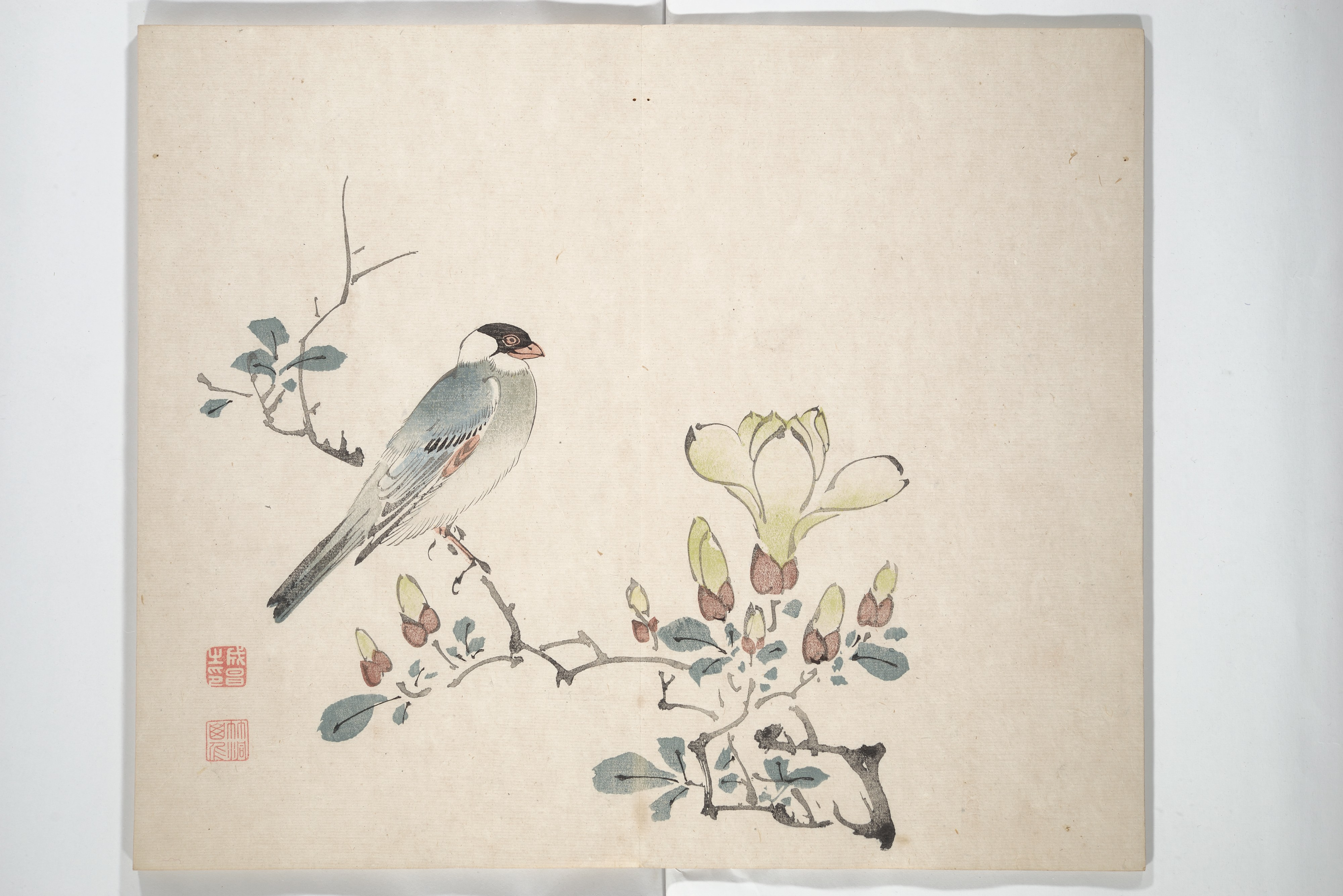

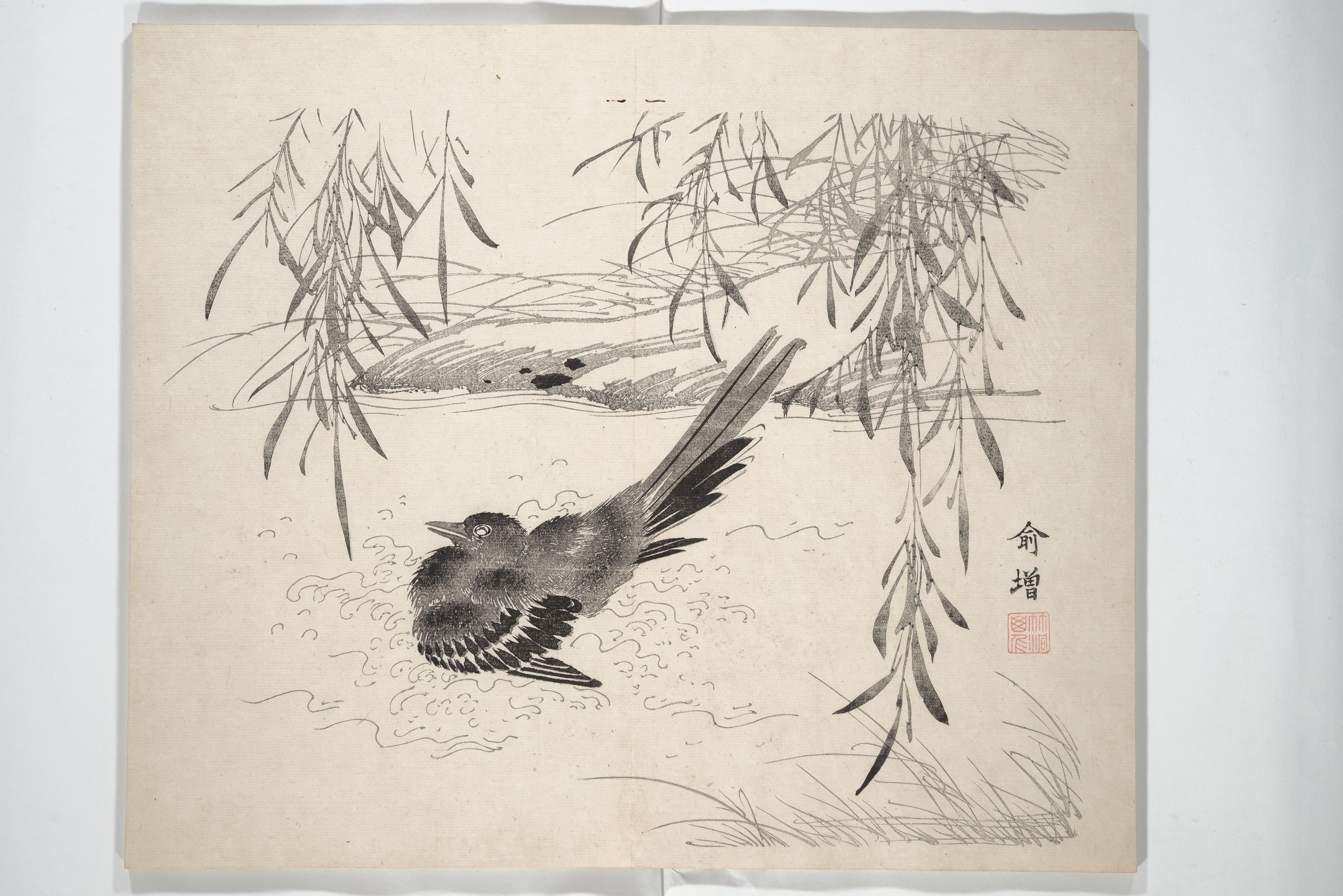

== Sources ==
- Tazawa, Yutaka: "Nakabayashi Chikutō". In: Biographical Dictionary of Japanese Art. Kodansha International, 1981. ISBN 0-87011-488-3.
- Laurance P. Roberts: "Chikutō". In: A Dictionary of Japanese Artists. Weatherhill, 1976. ISBN 0-8348-0113-2.
- Kazuko Kameda-Madar, “Copying and Theory in Edo Period Japan (1615-1868)” Art History: Special Issue, ‘Theorizing Imitation in a Global Context, Paul Duro, ed., Association of Art Historians (London: September 2014): 708-727, https://doi.org/10.1111/1467-8365.12111
