= Okuhara Seiko =

Japanese artist (1837–1913)

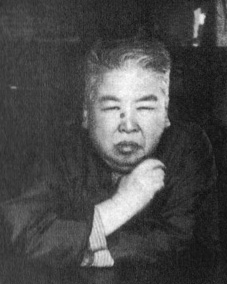
Okuhara Seiko

Okuhara Seiko (奥原 晴湖; 1837–1913) was a Literati artist in Japan in the late 19th century. She became a leading artist in Japan founding an art school and displaying her art throughout the country. In 1891, at the age of fifty-five, Seiko decided to retire to a country village. The paintings created by Seiko following her retirement are highly regarded and considered to be some of her finest work.

== Biography ==
Born in Koga, now Ibaraki Prefecture, Okuhara Seiko was the daughter of a high-ranking samurai and renowned for her success as a painter, Seiko resided primarily in Edo-Tokyo, a political and social center of her time. Although the Koga domain had legal restrictions that prevented women from leaving Koga, she bypassed these restrictions by getting adopted by her aunt in the neighboring Sekiyado Domain. She was educated in Chinese history, literature, poetry, and philosophy— core subjects for a classical education at the time. She moved to Edo, around 1865, where she taught painting and lived in her later years with her companion and student, Watanabe Seiran (1855-1918). Seiran, who stayed by Seiko's side for more than 40 years, ended up adopting Seiko's style. Her work is influenced by the Kanō school, but is categorized as within the nanga literati school. Seiko, like most successful Japanese artists of her time, adapted Chinese literati styles to Japanese tastes. Seiko retired from the capital and continued her active life of painting, traveling and poetry from a countryside villa in Kumagaya.

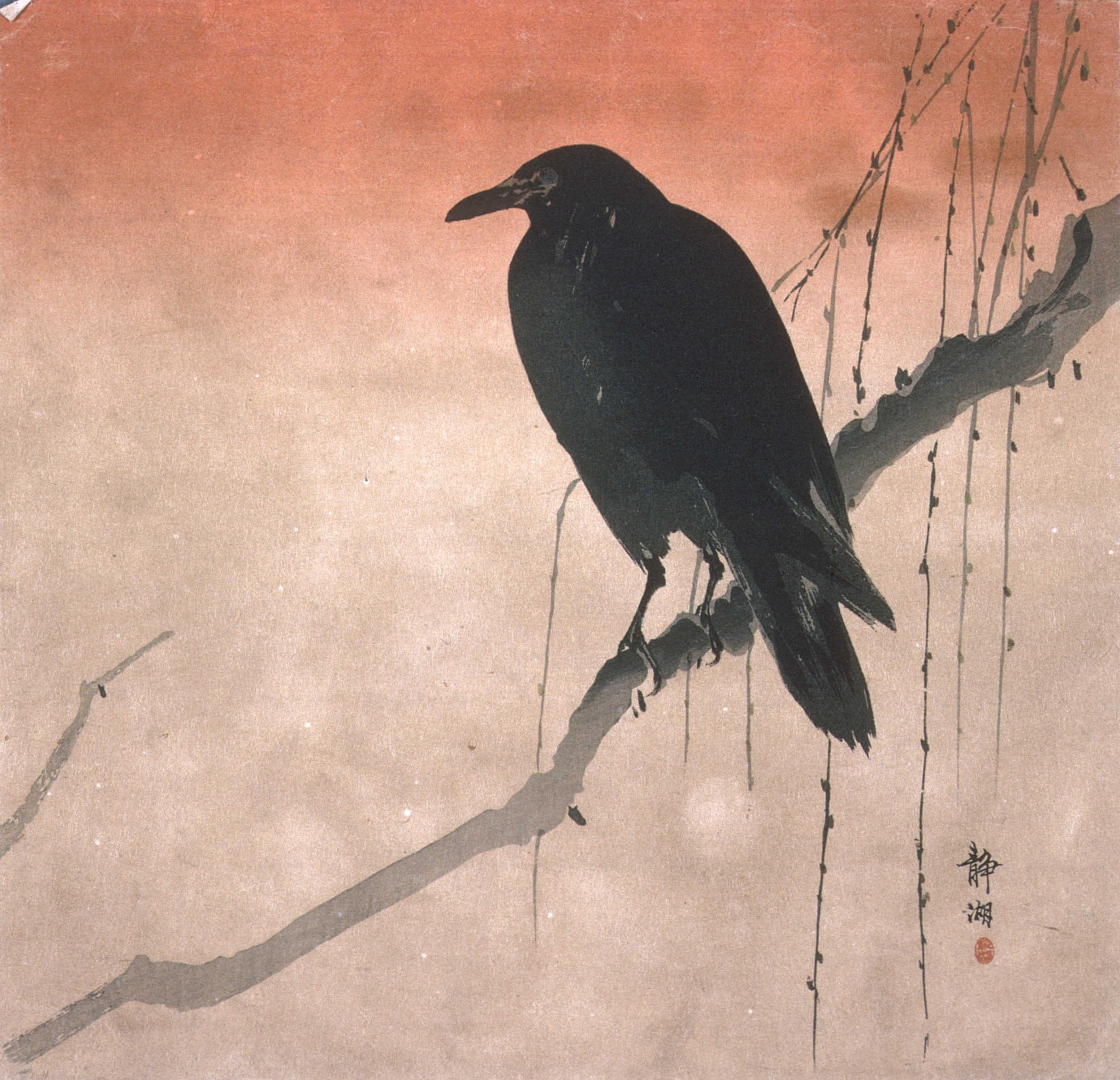
Untitled

Seiko is notable for her established and well-recognized career during the Meiji period, as well as her reputation within the primarily male literati school. Early in her career, she changed her name from Setsuko to the gender-neutral Seiko. Her work has been characterized as "masculine" in both painting and calligraphy, which may be attributed both to the liberal lifestyle she maintained and the role of women painters at the time. Seiko was also noted for wearing masculine clothing and short hair, deliberately eschewing a feminine persona. As a famous female bunjin (literati artist) artist, she is renowned for earning her own success with her art without literary or artistic connections, much like her contemporary Noguchi Shohin. Both artists also omitted the feminine character ‘joshi’ in their signatures, like many female artists. She and Noguchi Shohin were friends of the statesman Kido Takayoshi and they enjoyed his patronage. Kido and the two of them would create gassaku which are collaborative paintings that include both pictures and text.

Notably, research about female painters in East Asia during the 19th and 20th century is lacking. Historians have suggested that this is not due to a dearth in practicing female artists, which began to be more widely accepted in the 18th century, among the daughters of the gentry. Although women were celebrated as authors and poets, paintings by female artists may have been characterized by Japanese historians as effeminate.

== Style ==
She was a minor pupil of Tani Bunchō, but because of her gender, was not allowed to enter into an apprenticeship. Part of her artistic training involved the copying of funpon (pictorial models), which may be seen in her work and were also later used in her teaching. The use of funpon was derived from the Chinese, as the literati practice followed a Chinese example. Seiko was celebrated for her individual style, which drew from a variety of artistic elements and examples. Seiko predominantly used two distinct painting techniques: the Tokai style, popular in the 1870s and 1880s, which included loosely drawn ink landscapes and idiosyncratic calligraphy, and the Kumagaya style, popular in the 1890s and 1900s, which featured complex full-color brushwork on silk. During Japan at the time, learning through imitation in order to best achieve personal style and expression was reflective of the literati culture.

== Works ==
In 1907, Okuhara Seiko designed Beauty by Plum and Window, a unique scroll that implements both painted images as well as poetic calligraphic writing in the Chinese language. Her art piece derives from a new formalized configuration of Chinese art known as “literati art” that was perceived as an outlet for artists to express themselves through multiple dimensions. In Beauty by Plum and Window, Seiko illustrates a beautiful young woman sitting by an open window as she glances outward towards a plum blossom tree. The painting insinuates a sense of duality between intimacy and secrecy, for the open window permits voyeurism from the external gaze while the combination of the window, curtain, and tree conceal and protect the woman's beauty.

Although many of her works remain in private hands, there is a major collection at the Koga City History Museum. Other museums that hold her work include the Tokyo National Museum, the Museum of Modern Art, Ibaraki, the Saitama Prefectural Museum of Modern Art, the Minneapolis Institute of Art, the Los Angeles County Museum of Art, the British Museum, the Philadelphia Museum of Art, the Brooklyn Museum, the University of Michigan Museum of Art, the Museum of Fine Arts, Boston, the Harvard Art Museums, the Honolulu Museum of Art, the Weatherspoon Art Museum, and the Yale University Art Gallery. She was featured in the exhibit on "Her Brush: Japanese Women Artists from the Fong-Johnstone Collection" at the Denver Art Museum in 2022.
