= Noguchi Shohin =

Japanese painter (1847–1917)

- 野口 小蘋
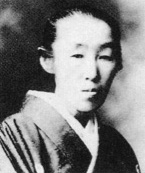
- Born: Matsumura Chikako (松邨 親子); February 25, 1847; Namba, Osaka
- Died: February 17, 1917 (aged 69)
- Known for: Bunjin painting
- Spouse: Noguchi Masaaki (野口 正章)
- Children: Iku (郁子) (daughter) (Noguchi Shokei (野口 小蕙)) (daughter)

Noguchi Shohin (野口 小蘋) (25 February 1847 – 17 February 1917) was a Japanese painter.

== Biography ==
Shohin was born in Ōsaka Prefecture in 1847. She studied bird-and-flower and landscape painting with the artist Hine Taizan in Kyoto. Her paintings were bought by the Japanese Imperial family and in 1904 she was appointed an Imperial Household Artist, an honour reserved for the most distinguished artists. She was a friend of the statesman Kido Takayoshi and she and Okuhara Seiko enjoyed his patronage. Kido and the two of them would create gassaku, or collaborative paintings.

Her daughters Iku and Shokei also became artists.

In 1982 and 2005 Yamanashi Prefectural Museum of Art held exhibitions of her art.

== Style ==
Shohin's paintings suggest a woman who felt equal to men in her society. She illustrates women who appear as literati painting, playing music and doing calligraphy. Her paintings show some independence as women's paintings of her time usually followed tradition or the subjects laid down by the artist's schools.
