= Rengetsu ware =

Type of Japanese poetry

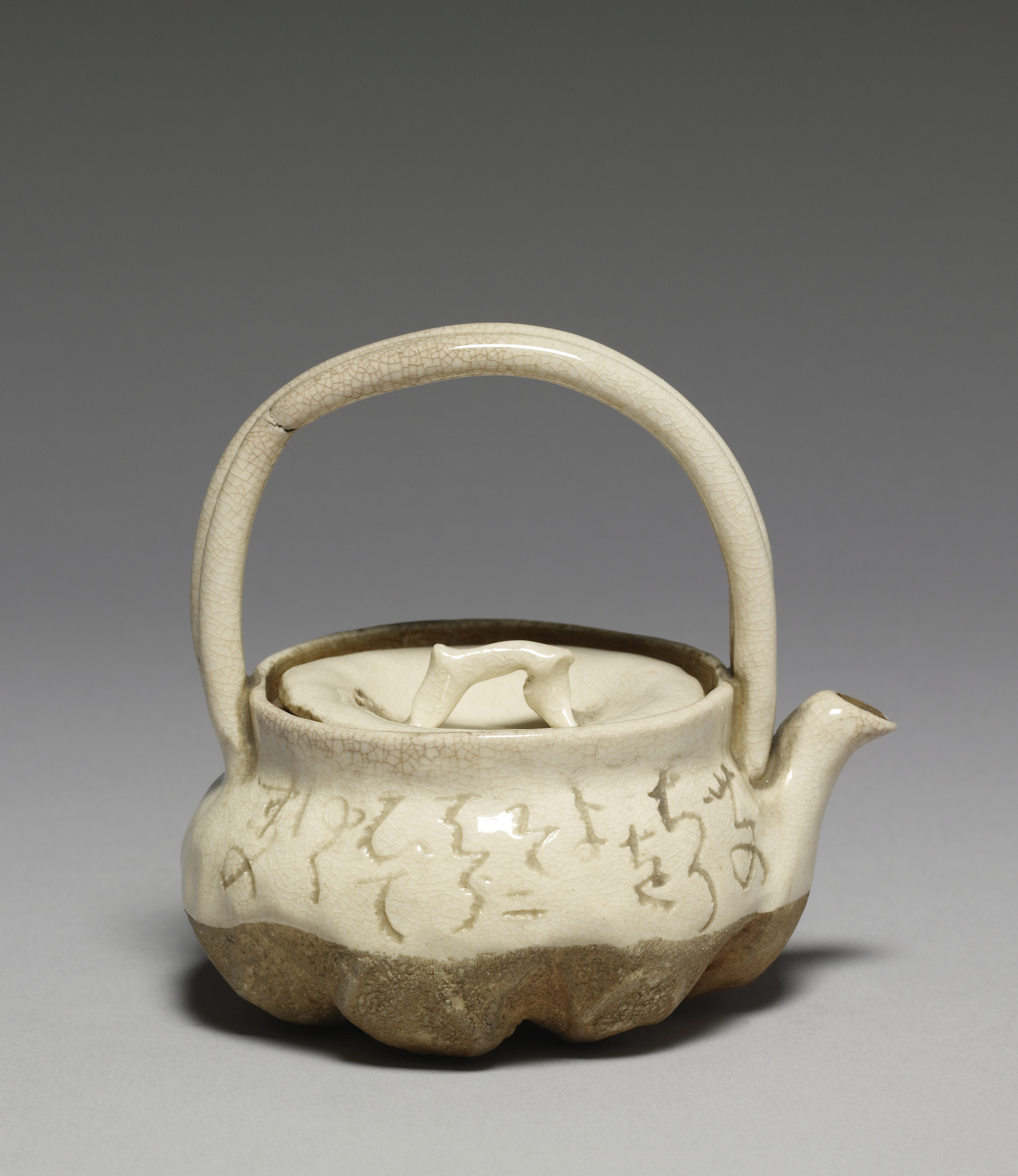
Teapot for steeped tea (kyūsu) inscribed with a waka poem by Ōtagaki Rengetsu, stoneware with rice-straw-ash glaze, late Edo period-early Meiji era, mid-19th century

Rengetsu ware (蓮月焼, Rengetsu-yaki) is a type of Japanese pottery that was made by the Buddhist nun Ōtagaki Rengetsu (1791–1875).

She was a prolific poet and calligrapher, but also an artisan. She created a number of vessels for sencha and chanoyu tea drinking traditions. She also created a large number of sake vessels such as tokuri flasks and guinomi cups. She adorned her ceramics with poems written in her calligraphic style.

Her style of ware was continued even after her death and a traditional center of production was in Okazaki, Kyoto.
