= Tokoname ware =

Type of Japanese pottery

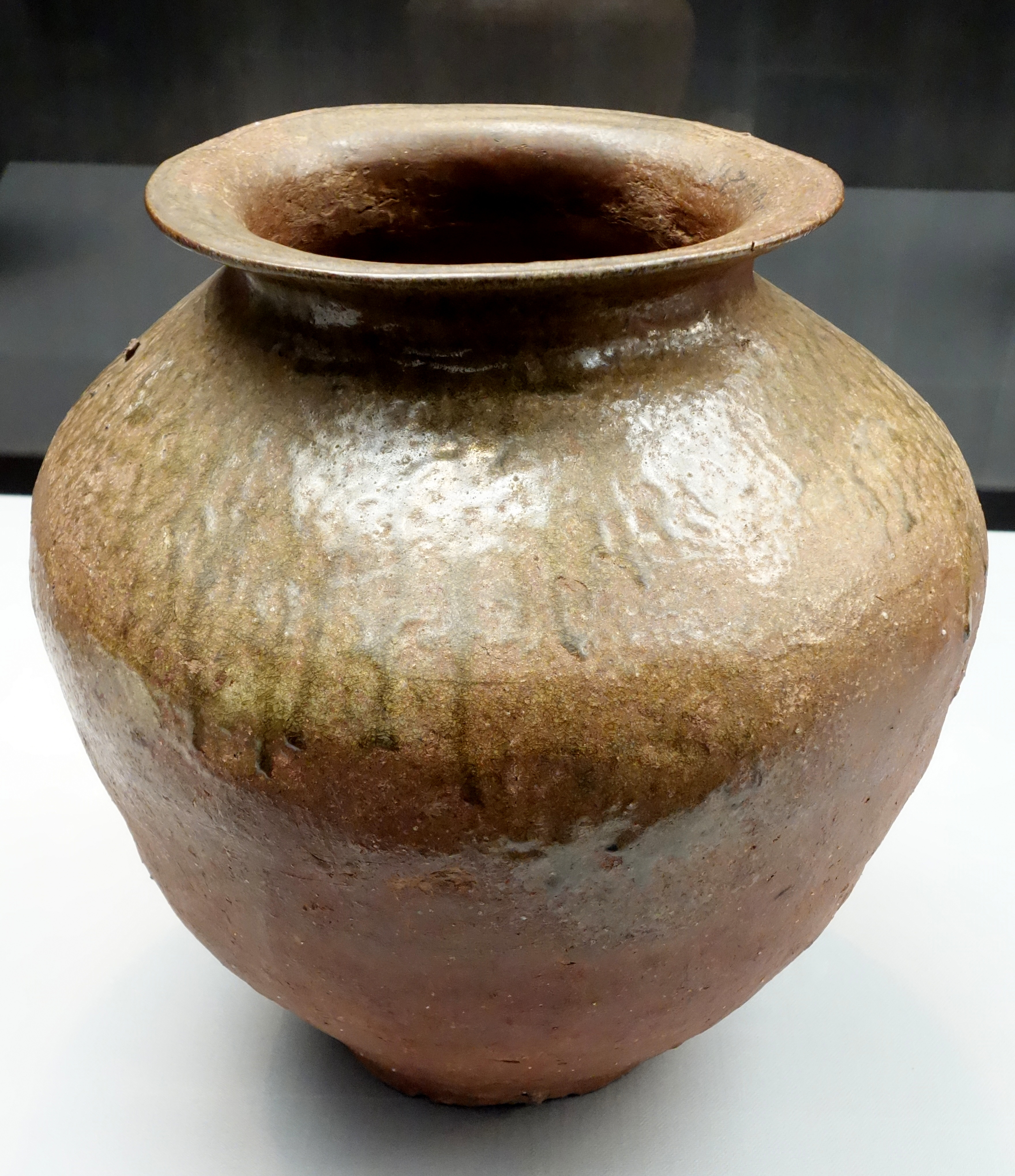
Natural glaze ware jar, excavated at Ise, Mie, Heian period, 12th century

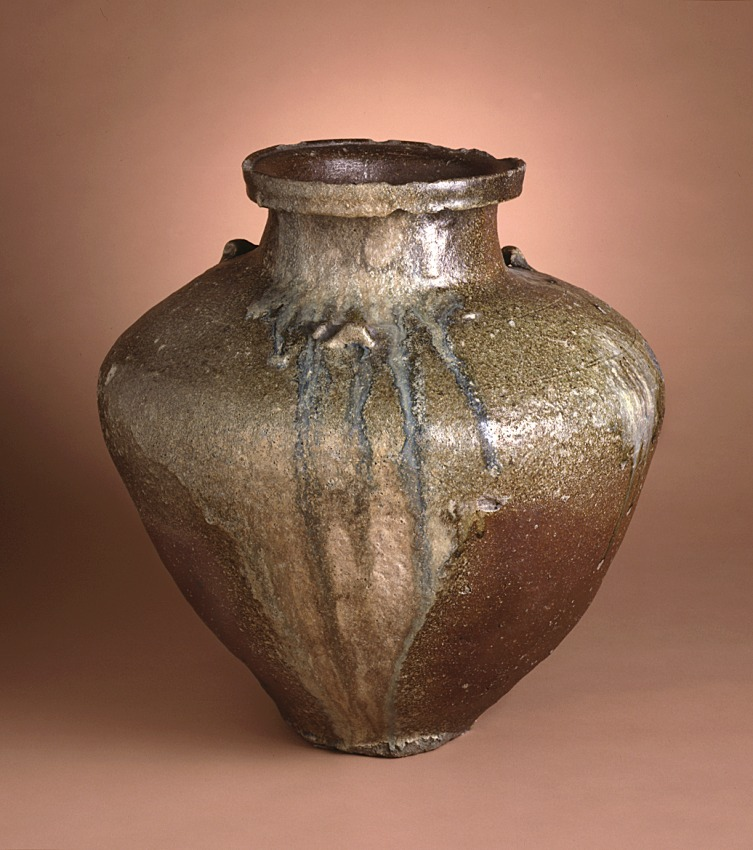
Coil-built stoneware with ash glaze. Kamakura period, 14th century

Tokoname ware (常滑焼, Tokoname-yaki) is a type of Japanese pottery, stoneware, and ceramics produced in and around the municipality of Tokoname, Aichi, in central Japan. Tokoname was the location of one of the Six Ancient Kilns of Japan.

== History ==
Pottery made in Tokoname dates back to the 12th century. During the Heian period, what is now called Tokoname ware was already part of daily life. A kiln known as the Takasaka kiln was built in the 14th century. Towards the end of the Edo period in the late 19th century, Koie Hokyu completed a chambered "climbing kiln" (nobori-gama). The excellent reputation of modern Tokoname ware was established by his son Koie Hoju. He laid the foundations for earthenware pipe making and introduced the redware for which the town became renowned. A statue was later put up in his honour in the town.

The construction of the Meitetsu Tokoname Line in the Meiji era encouraged production and provided transportation for the increasing tile production during the Taishō era.

The traditions behind Tokoname ware have been kept alive by generations of potters. In 1998, third-generation potter Yamada Jōzan III (三代山田常山 1924–2006) was named a Living National Treasure, after being recognised as a National Intangible Cultural Asset for making small pouring vessels. His son Yamada Jōzan IV (b. 1954) assumed his father's title after his death. Another noted potter from the Shōwa era was Ezaki Issei (江崎一生 1918–1992). His students were Takeuchi Kimiaki (竹内公明 1948–2011) and Osako Mikio (大迫みきお 1940–1995). In January 2007, Tokoname was officially protected as a local brand.

Products that Tokoname is renowned for today are wind chimes, redware tea pots, shochu servers, tea incense burners. Industrial production also covered roof tiles, toilet seats and water pipelines. Antique bonsai pots are collector items and are still produced today. The manufacturer INAX operates a number of museums in Tokoname that showcase the history of industrial production.

Tokoname ware can be found through the Tokoname Pottery Association Cooperative Union, the Tokoname Pottery Wholesale Association and the Tokoname ware wholesale centre Ceramall.

== Climbing kiln ==
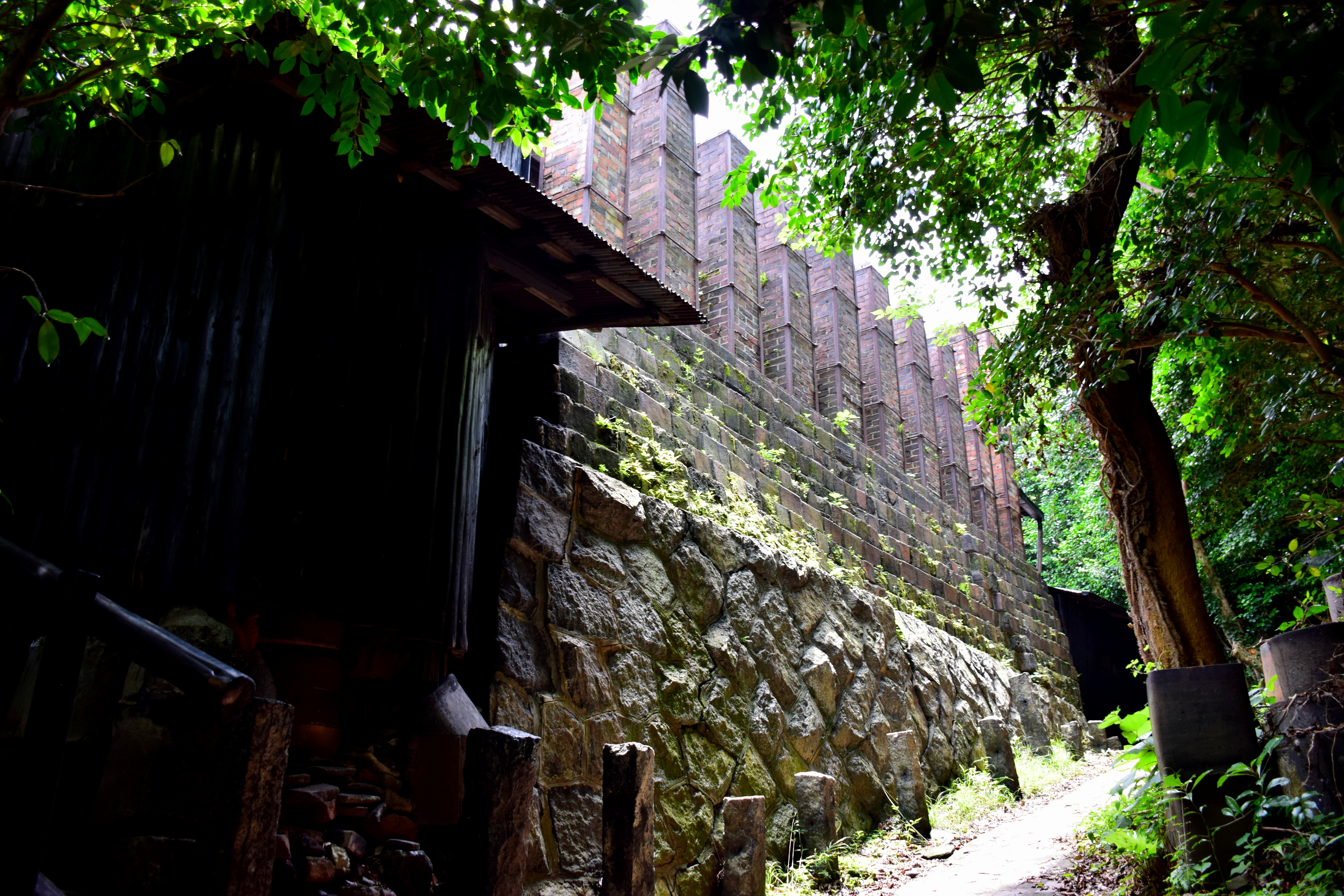
The Tōei kiln, largest climbing kiln (nobori-gama) in Japan

About 60 climbing kilns formerly operated in Tokoname. The Tōei Kiln (陶栄窯) is a climbing kiln (nobori-gama) that was constructed in Meiji 20 (1887) and used until Shōwa 49 (1974). It is the largest climbing kiln existing in Japan. It was designated as an Important Tangible Cultural Property by the government in Shōwa 57 (1982). It has eight firing chambers running a 17° incline and ten chimneys of varying height.

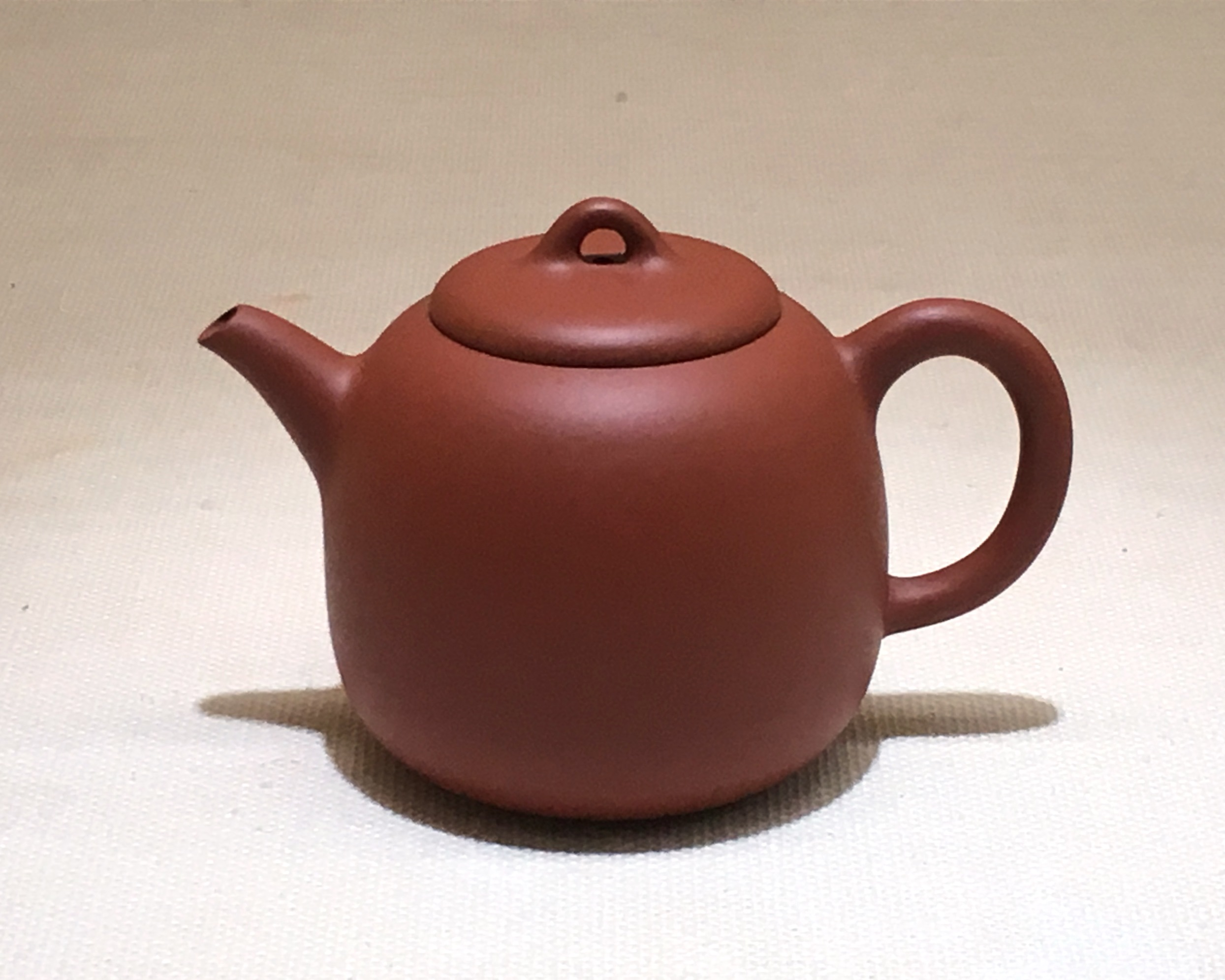
Kyūsu tea pot, Taishō era c. 1921–1925, by Yamada Jōzan I

== See also ==
- Seto ware
- List of Traditional Crafts of Japan
