= Ōtagaki Rengetsu =

Buddhist nun, poet and potter (1791–1875)

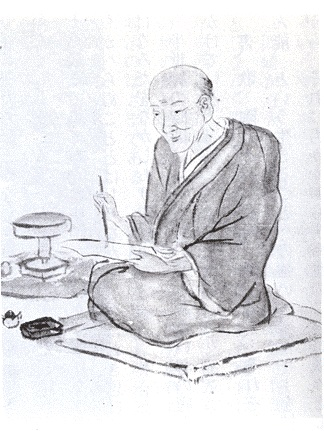
- Depiction of Ōtagaki Rengetsu at a high age, writing
- Born: 10 February 1791
- Died: 10 December 1875 (aged 84)
- Known for: Poetry, Painting, Calligraphy, Pottery

Ōtagaki Rengetsu (大田垣 蓮月; 10 February 1791 – 10 December 1875) was a Buddhist nun who is widely regarded to have been one of the greatest Japanese poets of the 19th century. She was also a skilled potter and painter and expert calligrapher.

== Biography ==
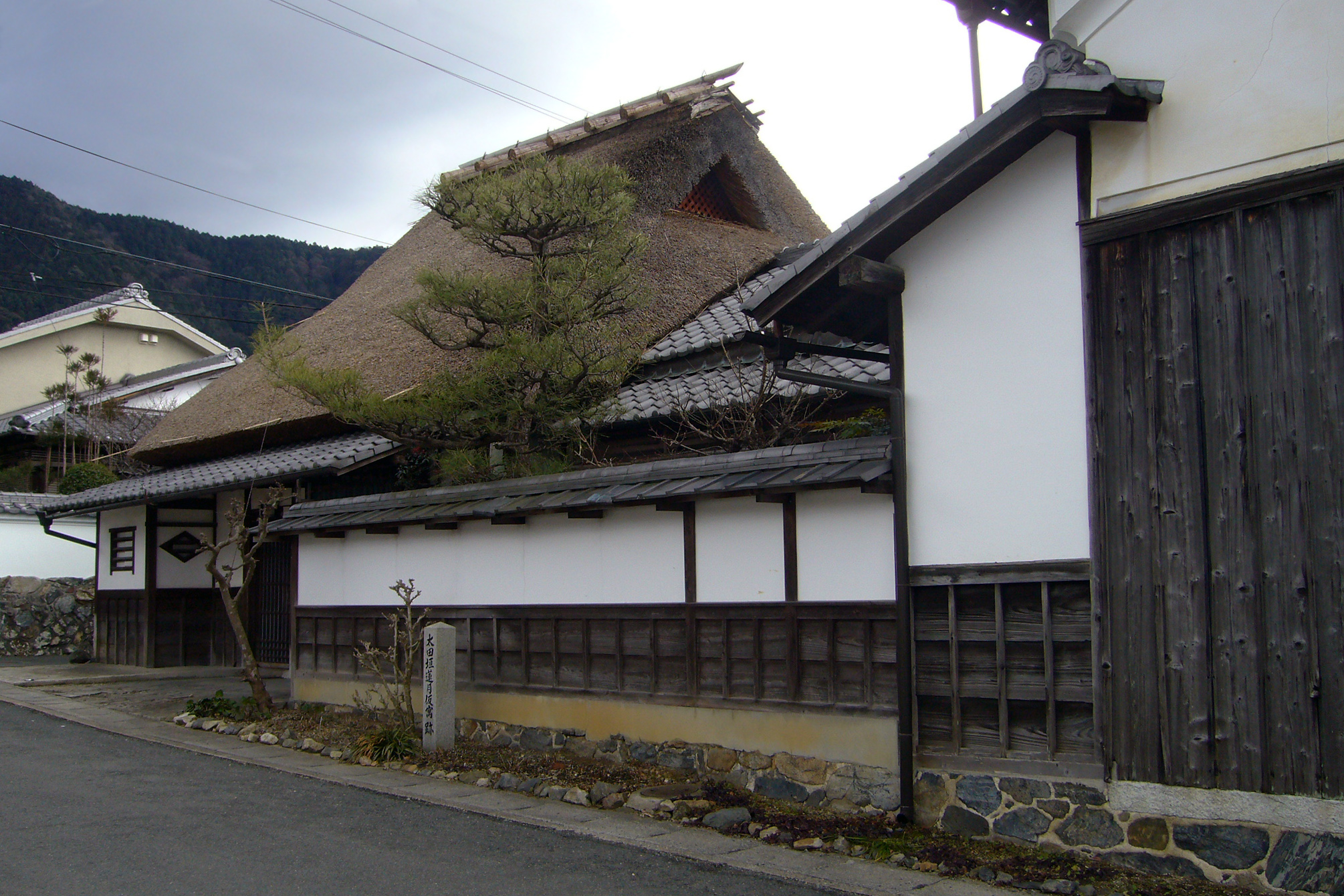
Ōtagaki Rengetsu Kagu-ato in Kyoto

She was the daughter of a courtesan and a nobleman. Born into a samurai family with the surname Tōdō, she was adopted at a young age by the Ōtagaki family. She was a lady in waiting at Kameoka Castle from age 7 to 16, when she was married. She was married twice and had five children.

However, her husband died in 1823. She became a Buddhist nun at the age of thirty after burying both husbands, all of her children, her stepmother and stepbrother. Her adoptive father joined her. Ōtagaki joined the temple Chion-in and became a nun, taking Rengetsu ("Lotus Moon") as her Buddhist name. She remained at Chion-in for nearly ten years, and lived in a number of other temples for the following three decades, until 1865, when she settled at the Jinkō-in where she lived out the rest of her life.

Being a woman, she was only allowed to live in a Buddhist monastery for a couple of years. After that she lived in tiny huts and moved around quite a lot. She was a master of martial arts having been trained since childhood by her adoptive family. The Otagaki family were well known as teachers of ninjutsu. She trained in jujutsu, naginatajutsu, kenjutsu, and kusarigama.

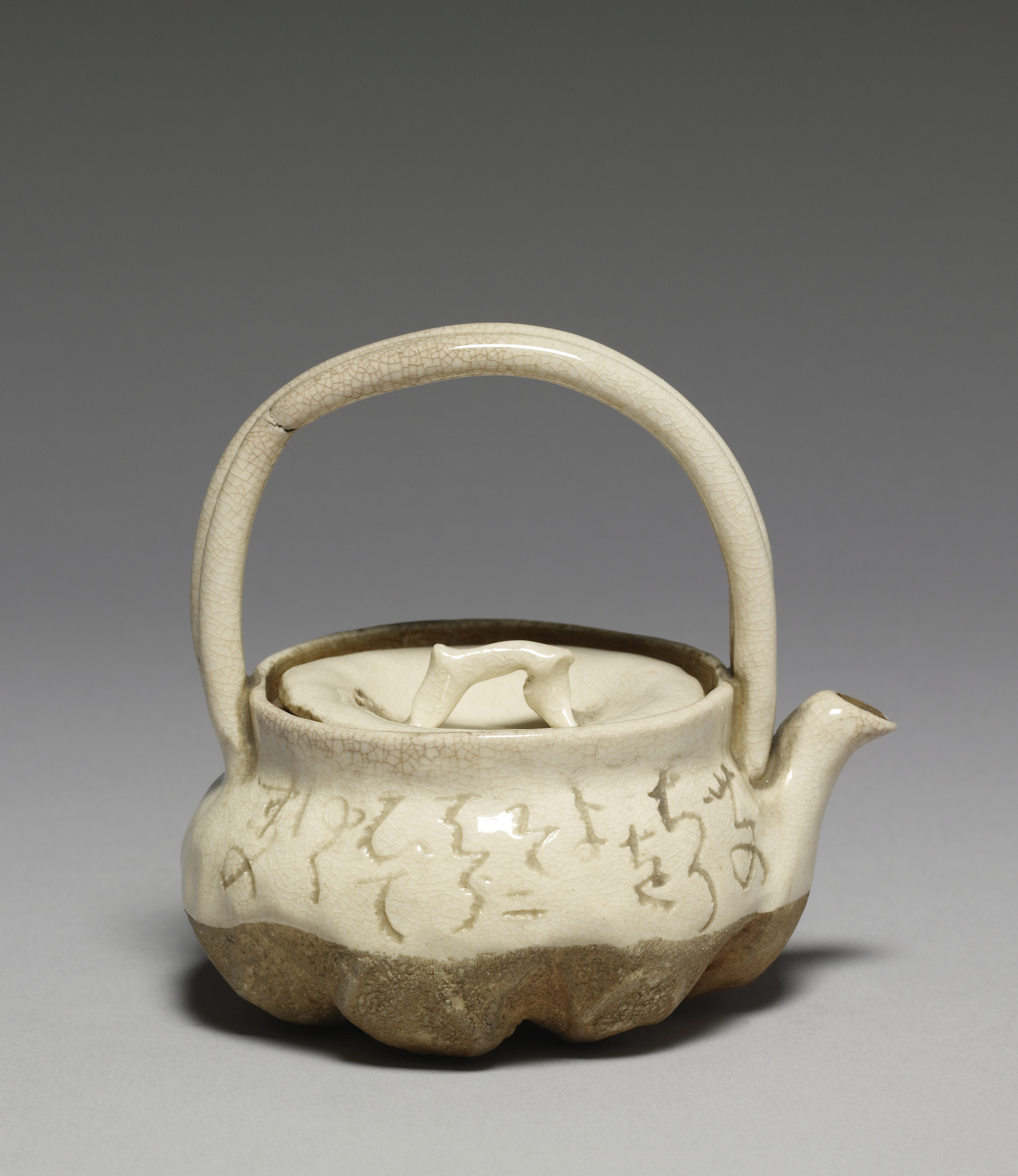
Rengetsu ware teapot for steeped tea (kyūsu) inscribed with a waka poem by Ōtagaki Rengetsu, stoneware with rice-straw-ash glaze. Late Edo period-early Meiji era, mid-19th century

Though best known as a waka poet, Rengetsu was also accomplished at dance, sewing, some of the martial arts, and Japanese tea ceremony. She admired and studied under a number of great poets including Ozawa Roan and Ueda Akinari, and later in her life became a close friend and mentor to the artist Tomioka Tessai. A number of Tessai's works, though painted by him, feature calligraphy by Rengetsu.

Her ceramic work became so popular it was continued after her death as Rengetsu ware. Her work (both pottery and calligraphy) is held in several museums worldwide, including the Birmingham Museum of Art, Los Angeles County Museum of Art, the Harn Museum of Art, the Saint Louis Art Museum, the University of Michigan Museum of Art, the Walters Art Museum, the Harvard Art Museums, the British Museum, and the Maidstone Museum.
