= Kameda Bōsai =

Kameda Bôsai
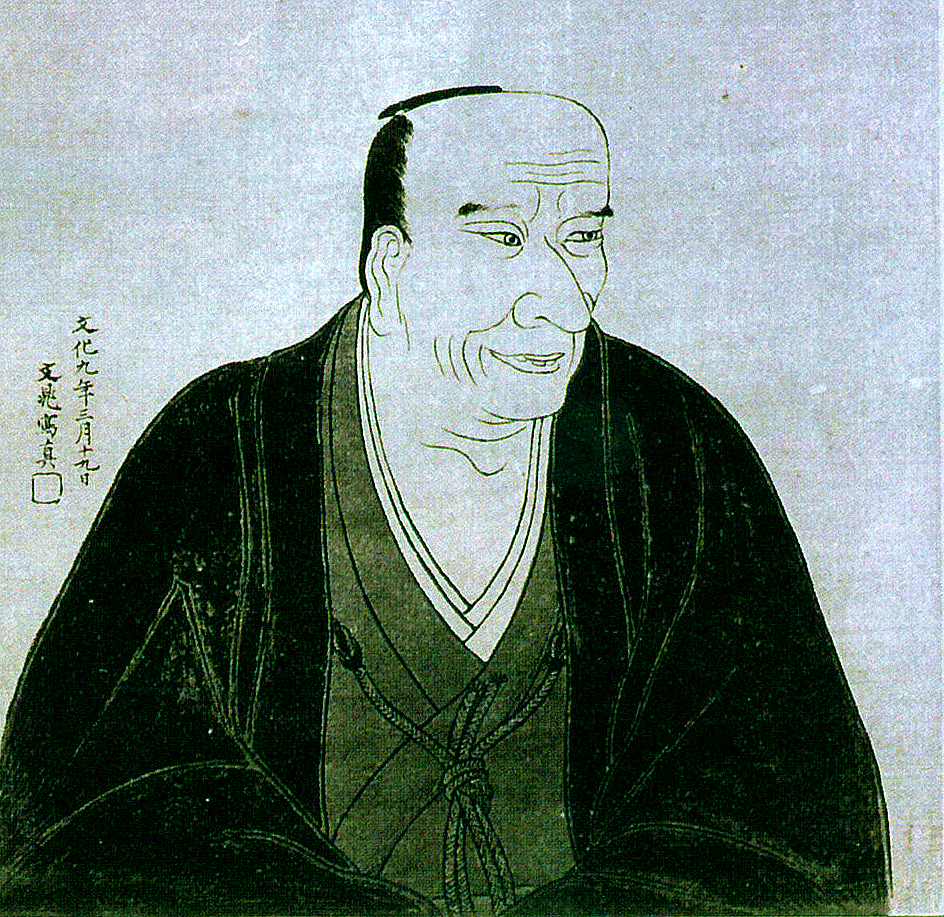
- Born: 1752; Edo, Tokugawa shogunate
- Died: 1826 (aged 73–74)
- Occupations: Confucian scholar, calligrapher, painter
- Notable work: Kyōchūzan (Mountains of the Heart)

Kameda Bōsai (亀田鵬斎; 1752–1826) was a Japanese Confucian scholar, calligrapher, and painter known to mix the disciplines of nanga painting and calligraphy with Confucian studies. He was affiliated with Setchūgaku-ha or the "Eclectic School of Confucianism." His most well known work is Kyōchūzan (Mountains of the Heart), a wood block printed book.

== Biography ==
Bōsai was born in 1752 in the city of Edo, the son of a merchant family. The family's ancestors had been farmers to the North of the city but had come to sell products including tortoiseshell combs. The family name Kameda translates literally to "tortoise field."

Bōsai's mother gave birth to him relatively late in life, at the age of forty-two. She died a year after his birth.

Confucian-style education was typically reserved for children of the samurai class, but in a time of shifting social classes, Bōsai was made an exception. He was given a thorough classical Chinese education. At the age of five or six, Bōsai began his study of calligraphy with Mitsui Shinna (ja). At thirteen, he began his study of Confucian classics with Inoue Kinga (ja). Kinga taught his student to approach disparate schools of Confucianism, keeping the good and discarding the bad. He believed that a person should study the works and develop their own understanding.

Bōsai established himself as a teacher of Confucianism and opened his own school by the age of twenty-two. In the twenty years to follow he is said to have attracted over a thousand students.

In 1779, Bōsai wrote a book on his interpretation of the Confucian Analects.

In 1781, Bōsai addressed a proposal to the shogunal government, suggesting lower taxes for farmers, new methods of accounting, and criticizing government extravagance. Although the proposal reflected Bōsai's belief in the role of scholars to serve their country, it went unanswered.

The following decade saw a series of famines that led to the replacement of the chief councilor of the Shogunate. In 1790, Matsudaira Sadanobu, the new chief councilor and regent to the Shogun, changed education policy through the Kansei Edict. This enforced the study of the Neo-Confucianism of Zhu Xi as the official Confucian philosophy of Japan and banned heterodox interpretations, including those of Bōsai's school. Bōsai was one of five prominent scholars who resisted the prohibition. Yamamoto Hokuzan, Tsukada Taihō, Toshima Hōshū, Ichikawa Kakumei, and Bōsai became known as Kansei no Gokujin, "The Five Demons of the Kansei Era."

Bōsai ultimately closed his school in 1797. With his livelihood as a teacher destroyed, Bōsai turned to the life of a literati. He sold sheets, screens, and inscriptions with his calligraphy and paintings and was commissioned to write the preface to books of a wide variety of subjects, including philosophy, painting, poetry, and even food. During this period, Bōsai traveled widely, receiving the hospitality of villagers and small town residents all over Japan in exchange for his original artwork.

In 1809, Bōsai began a journey to the province of Echizen which would last three years. During this trip, he is said to have struck up a friendship with the Zen poet-calligrapher Ryōkan, who composed a quatrain in his honor:

Bōsai is a wise man who doesn't fuss over worldly matters;

For some reason he has come to visit this town.

Yesterday, in the thronged streets,

I saw him laughing as someone supported him by the arm.

Bōsai, in turn, presented Ryōkan with a poem:

I envy your transcendence, you are not like other monks;

With sake cups filled to the brim, we talk and laugh by the altar lights.

You travel here and there , but your heart does not cling,

Unlike most men who are possessed by things of the world.

I am unworthy to climb with you the five sacred mountains,

It is too late for me to hope for nirvana.

Bōsai settled back in Edo in 1812.

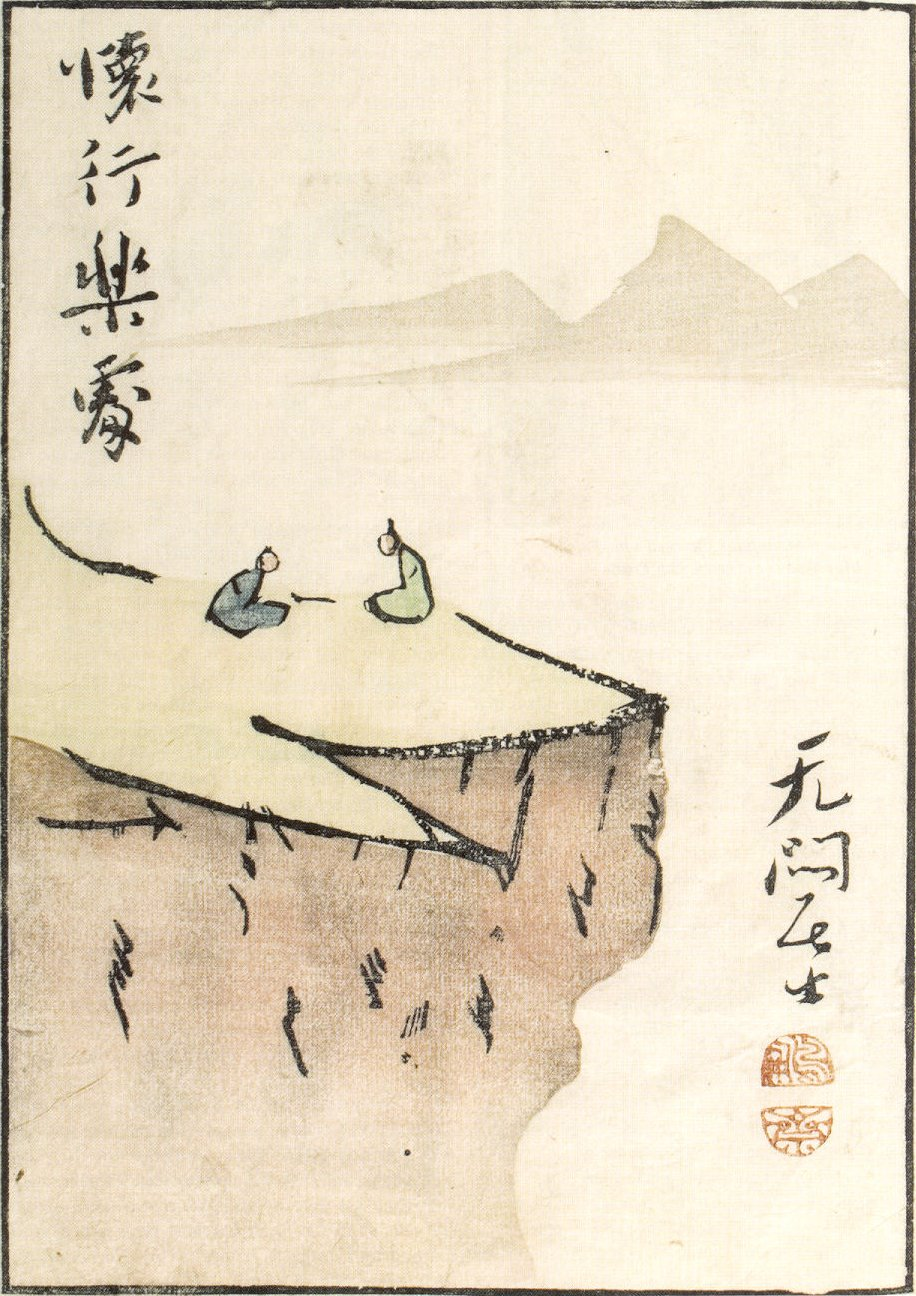
Yearning for a Pleasurable Place in Mountains of the Heart by Kameda Bôsai, 1816

Early in the year 1816, Bōsai attended a party during which he created his most famous work; Kyōchūzan (Mountains of the Heart), a wood block printed book containing thirty-three of Bōsai's paintings alongside his calligraphy. From colophons written for the book, we can gather that at the party, there was an ink pen made by Fang Yulu (1570 - 1619), the author of Fangshi Mopu, a Ming Period book on ink sticks. Intoxicated, Bōsai took up this pen and created the series of pages that would become Kyōchūzan. Bōsai expresses his attitude toward the work in the preface of the book (as translated by Johnathan Chaves):

The images on this paper are the mountains of my heart. They are merely freewheeling creations, lacking technique, of a sort never intended to be transmitted in great numbers. They derive their artistic lineage quite simply from the residual, unorthodox inspiration of a moment's terrible intoxication on my part.

Bōsai and his family were sustained by the sale of his calligraphy and paintings, and by his network of admirers until he died in 1826.

== Legacy ==
Bosai's work is featured in major museum collections in Japan and abroad, including the Metropolitan Museum of Art. Kyōchūzan (Mountains of the Heart) is considered a defining example of late Edo bunjinga.

Bōsai's son Ryōri was an accomplished sinologist in his own right. Bōsai's grandson, Ōkoku was concerned with the union of Shintō and Confucian thought and participated in the sonnō jōi movement.
