= Tani Bunchō =

Japanese artist (1763–1841)

Tani Bunchō (谷 文晁; October 15, 1763 – January 6, 1841) was a Japanese literati (bunjin) painter and poet.

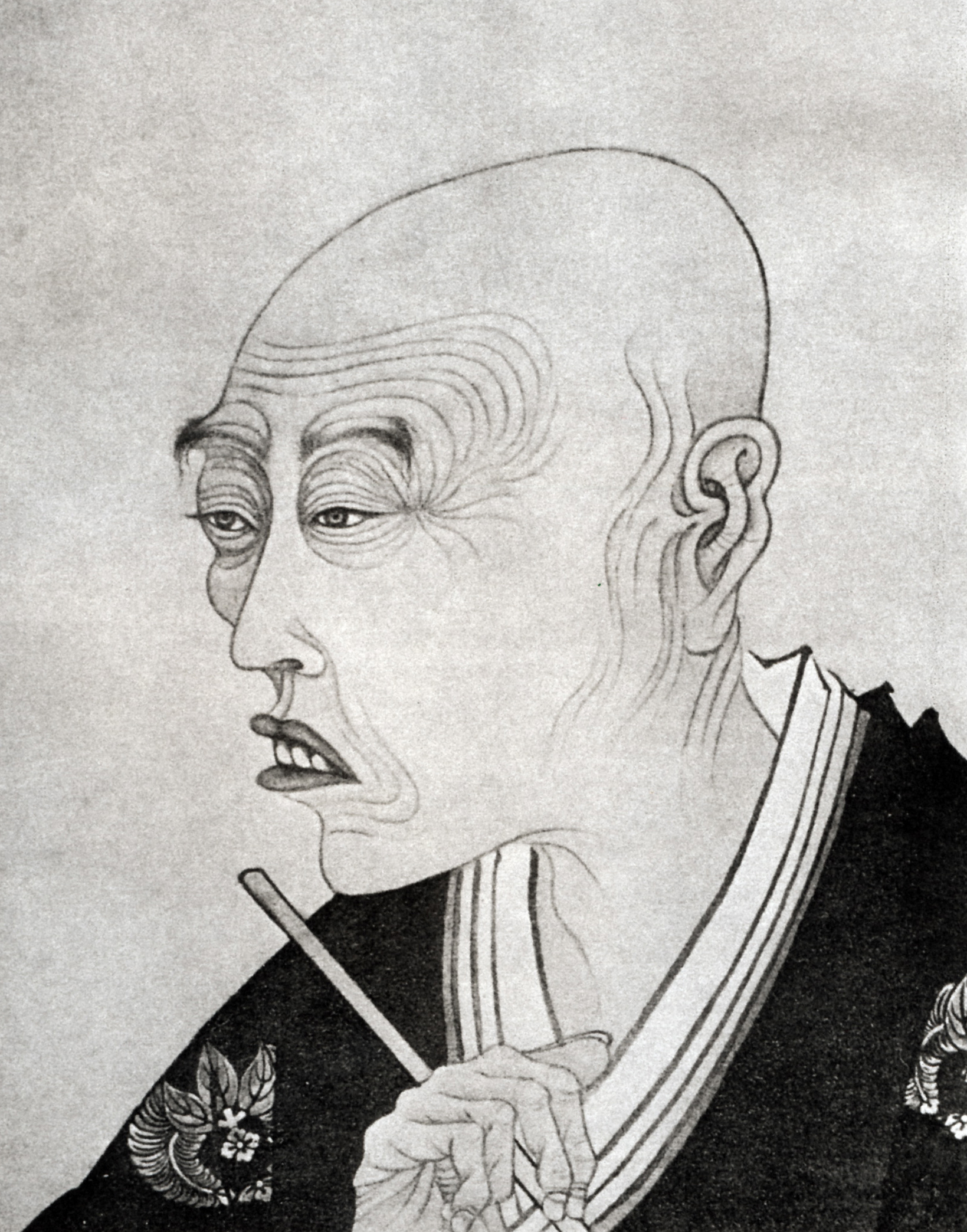
Portrait of Tani Bunchō

== Biography ==
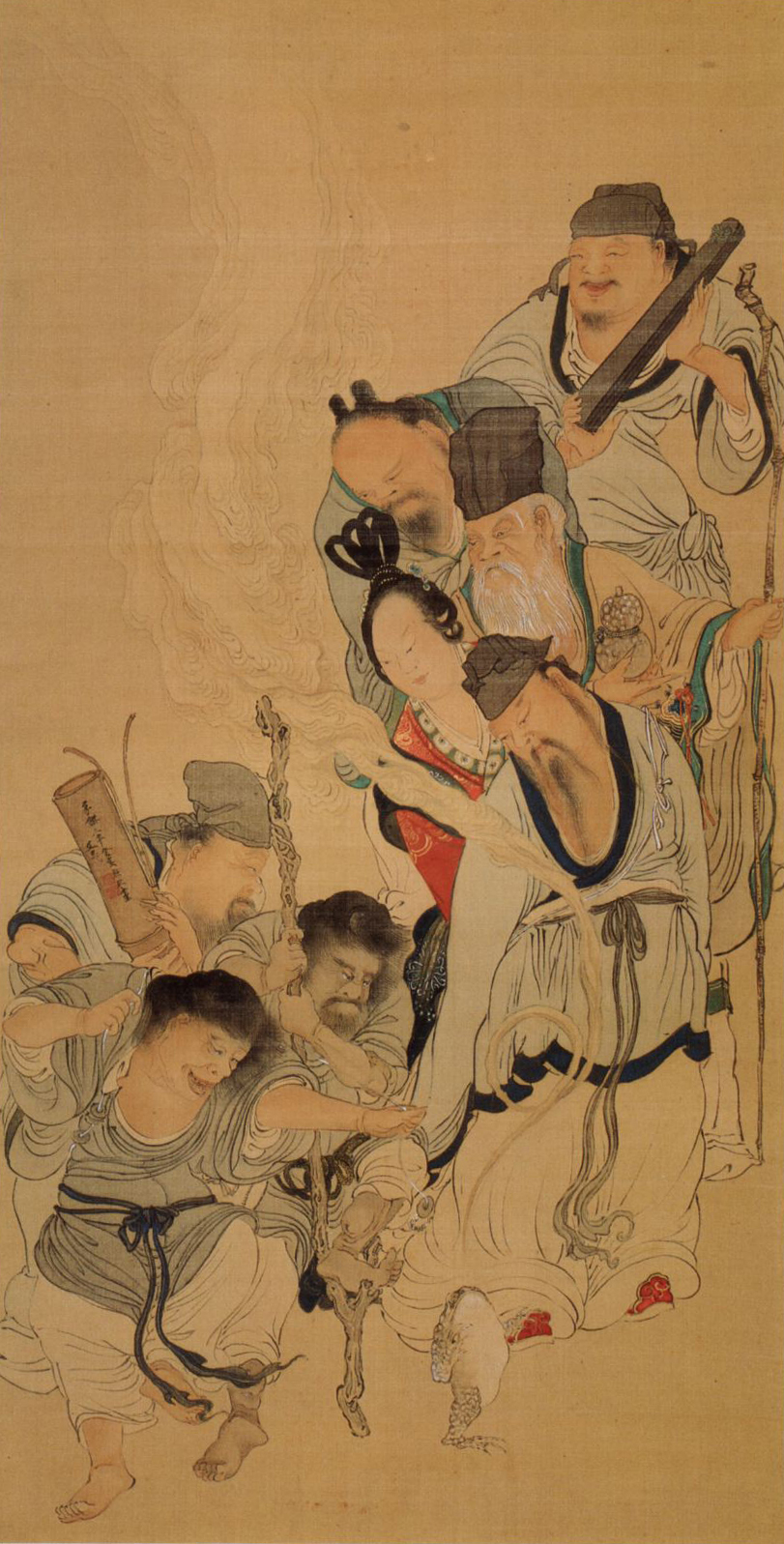
8 Daoist Immortals by Tani Bunchō

He was the son of the poet Tani Rokkoku (1729–1809). As his family were retainers of the Tayasu Family of descendants of the eighth Tokugawa shōgun, Bunchō inherited samurai status and received a stipend to meet the responsibilities this entailed. In his youth he began studying the painting techniques of the Kanō school under Katō Bunrei (1706–82). After Bunrei's death, Bunchō worked with masters of other schools, such as the literati painter Kitayama Kangen (1767–1801), and developed a wide stylistic range that included many Chinese, Japanese and European idioms. He rose to particular prominence as the retainer of Matsudaira Sadanobu (1759–1829), genetic son of the Tayasu who was adopted into the Matsudaira family before becoming chief senior councilor (rōjū shuza; 老中首座) of the Tokugawa Shogunate in 1787. Bunchō is best known for his idealized landscapes in the literati style (Nanga or Bunjinga).

== Style ==
Unlike most bunjinga painters of his time, however, Bunchō was an extremely eclectic artist, painting idealized Chinese landscapes, actual Japanese sites, and poetically inspired traditional scenery. He also painted portraits of his contemporaries (such as Ono Ranzan and Kimura Kenkadō), as well as imagined images of such Chinese literati heroes as Su Shi and Tao Yuanming. Since travel outside Japan was forbidden under the Tokugawa shogunate, Bunchō was unable to study in China; he spent many years traveling around Japan, studying Chinese, Japanese, and Western art (洋画, Yōga).

Watanabe Kazan, Sakai Hōitsu and Takaku Aigai were among his disciples. One of his pupils was the renowned painter Okuhara Seiko.
