= Tomioka Tessai =

Japanese artist

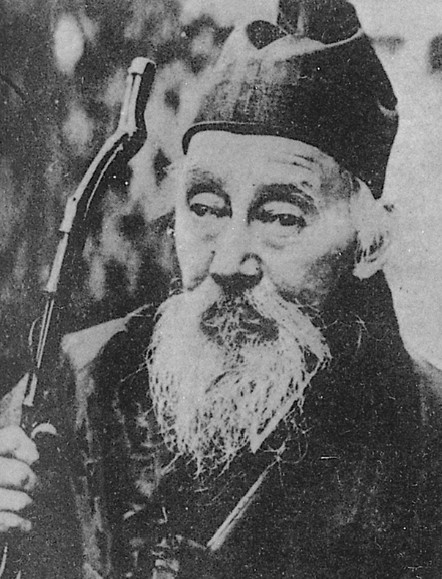
- Tomioka Tessai
- Born: Tomioka Yusuke, Tomioka Hyakuren; January 25, 1836 or January 27, 1837; Kyoto, Japan
- Died: December 31, 1924 (aged 87)
- Known for: Painter, calligrapher
- Movement: Bunjinga, Nihonga

Tomioka Tessai (Note: Japanese pronunciation: [to.mʲiꜜ.o.ka (|) tes.sai, to.mʲiꜜ.o.ka | teꜜs.sai, to.mʲi.o.ka teꜜs.sai]) (富岡 鉄斎; 25 January 1836 or 27 January 1837 – 31 December 1924) was the pseudonym for a painter and calligrapher in imperial Japan. He is regarded as the last major artist in the Bunjinga tradition and one of the first major artists of the Nihonga style. His real name was Yusuke, which he later changed to Hyakuren.

== Biography ==
Tessai was born in either 1836 or 1837 in Kyoto, as the second son of Tomioka Korenobu, who sold sacerdotal robes. Because his hearing was not good his parents decided he should be a scholar, rather than a merchant. He was educated as a scholar in classical Chinese philosophy and literature and the ancient Japanese classics under noted kokugaku scholar Okuni Tadamasa.

Tessai's father died in 1843, when he was only seven. The family fortunes declined, and young Tessai became a page at a Shinto shrine. Twelve years later, he came to be lodged with the now-famous Buddhist poet and nun Ōtagaki Rengetsu, who would become his greatest scholarly mentor and supporter. He developed his own style over the next decade or so, studying under a number of accomplished painters.

In 1861, Tessai opened a private school in Rengetsu's house to teach painting; he went on to become a teacher at the newly inaugurated Ritsumeikan University in 1868. He also did some work for the new Meiji government, contributing maps and topographical charts he created. Throughout the Meiji period, Tessai traveled extensively, visiting famous and scenic places that would later become subjects of his paintings. He was able to see many different sides of the country all the way from Nagasaki to Hokkaidō. He also served as a Shinto priest at a number of different shrines, but ultimately resigned from his final post when his brother died, so that he could look after his mother.

After Tessai settled back in Kyoto in 1882, he championed the old styles of Japanese traditional painting against the new influences of Western art (yōga), then becoming more and more popular, and was thus a participant in the early nihonga movement.

Tessai's early works followed the bunjinga styles of the early 19th century, although he also worked in almost all of the styles associated with Kyoto: Rimpa, Yamato-e, Otsu-e, etc. However, his mature style concentrated on Nanga, or Chinese style paintings based on the late Ming dynasty artists from Suzhou and Jiangsu Provinces, which had been introduced to Japan by Sakaki Hyakusen. Tessai tended towards use of rich colors to portray scenes of people in landscapes, with a composition intended to evoke or illustrate a historical or literary episode. He also sometimes made use of religious imagery, combining depictions of Buddhist bodhisattva with Daoist or Confucian figures to symbolize the unity of Asian religious traditions. Tessai's final works either use very brilliant colors, or else were monochrome ink with dense, rough brushwork and occasional slight jarring touches of bright pigments.

Two Divinities Dancing
- 二神会舞図 (Japanese)
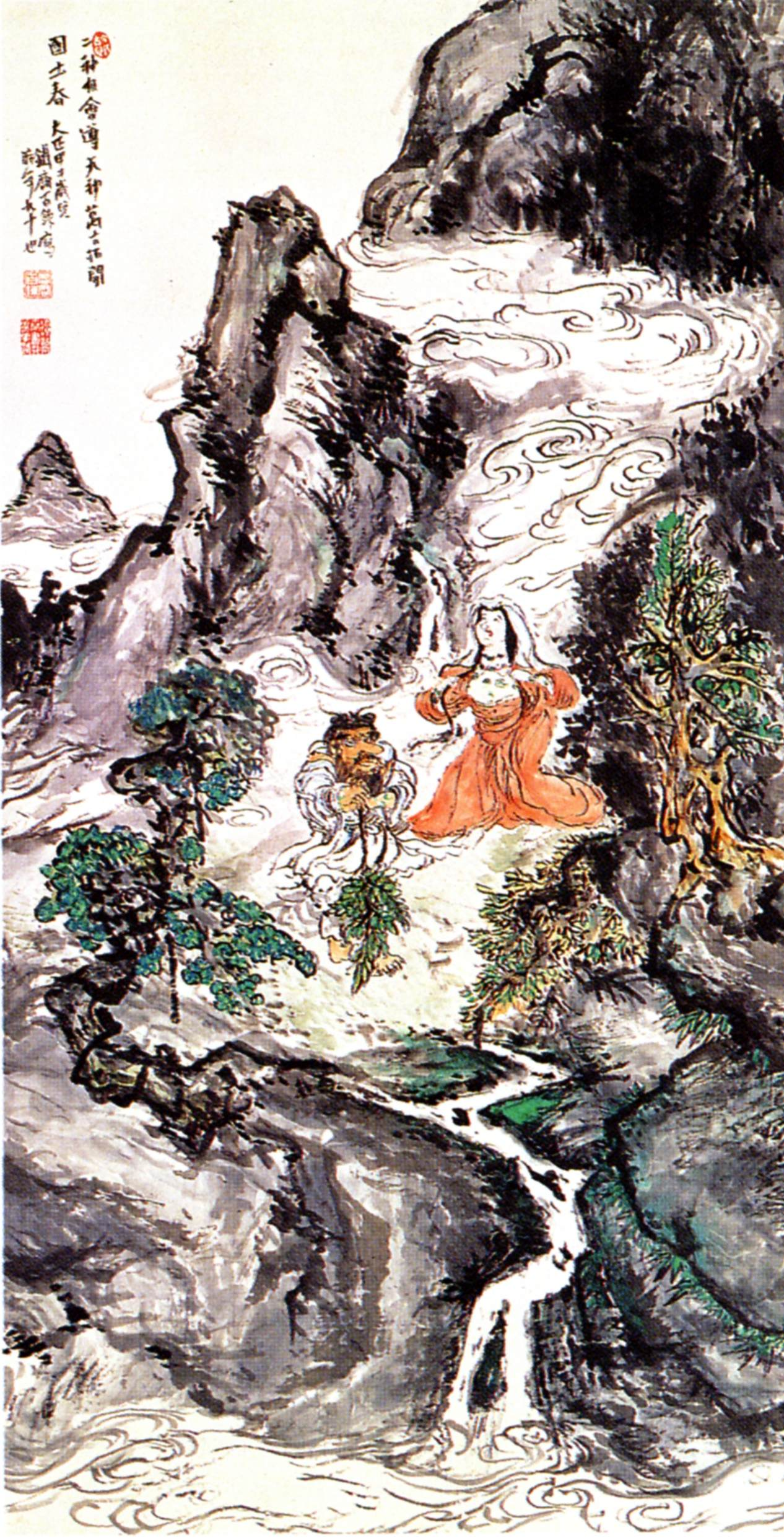
- Artist: Tomioka Tessai
- Year: 1924
- Type: Nihonga watercolor on silk
- Dimensions: 169 cm × 86 cm (67 in × 34 in)
- Location: Tokyo National Museum, Tokyo

In the 1890s, he was appointed a judge of the Young Men's Society of Painting, and became a professor at the Kyoto Fine Arts School soon afterwards. He also took part in the founding of several other art associations, including the Nanga Association of Japan. His mother died in 1895, but Tessai continued to have close relations with his family and gained a granddaughter several years later.

In 1907, he was appointed official painter to Emperor Meiji, who so liked his works that his commission was extended to cover the Imperial Household Agency as a court painter in 1917. He was also appointed a member of the Imperial Fine Arts Academy (Teikoku Bijutsu-in) in 1919.

Throughout his life, Tessai served as a Shinto priest and a scholar. He was an extremely prolific painter, and it is estimated that he painted approximately 20,000 paintings in the course of his career. On one occasion he completed 70 paintings in a single day. Tessai's best works were created in the last years of his life, from age 80 to his death in 1924 at age 88.

The largest collection of Tessai's works is at the Tessai Memorial Museum, a private art museum within the grounds of the Kiyoshikojin Seicho-ji, a Buddhist temple in Takarazuka, Hyogo. His art is also kept in the Princeton University Art Museum, University of Michigan Museum of Art, the National Museum of Asian Art, the British Museum, the Seattle Art Museum, the Metropolitan Museum of Art, the Nelson-Atkins Museum of Art, the Birmingham Museum of Art, the Minneapolis Institute of Art, and the Museum of Fine Arts, Boston.

== Important works ==
- 「阿倍仲麻呂明州望月図」「円通大師呉門隠栖図 (1914, Important Cultural Property) Hakutaka Museum
- 「二神会舞図」Tokyo National Museum
- 「旧蝦夷風俗図」(1896) Tokyo National Museum
- 「不尽山頂全図」
- 「蓬莱仙境図」
- 「弘法大師像図」
- 「蘇東坡図」
- 「武陵桃源図」 (1923)
- 「瀛洲遷境図」 (1923)
- 「阿倍仲麻呂在唐詠和歌図」Adachi Art Museum
