= Nanga (Japanese painting) =

Late Edo school of Japanese painting

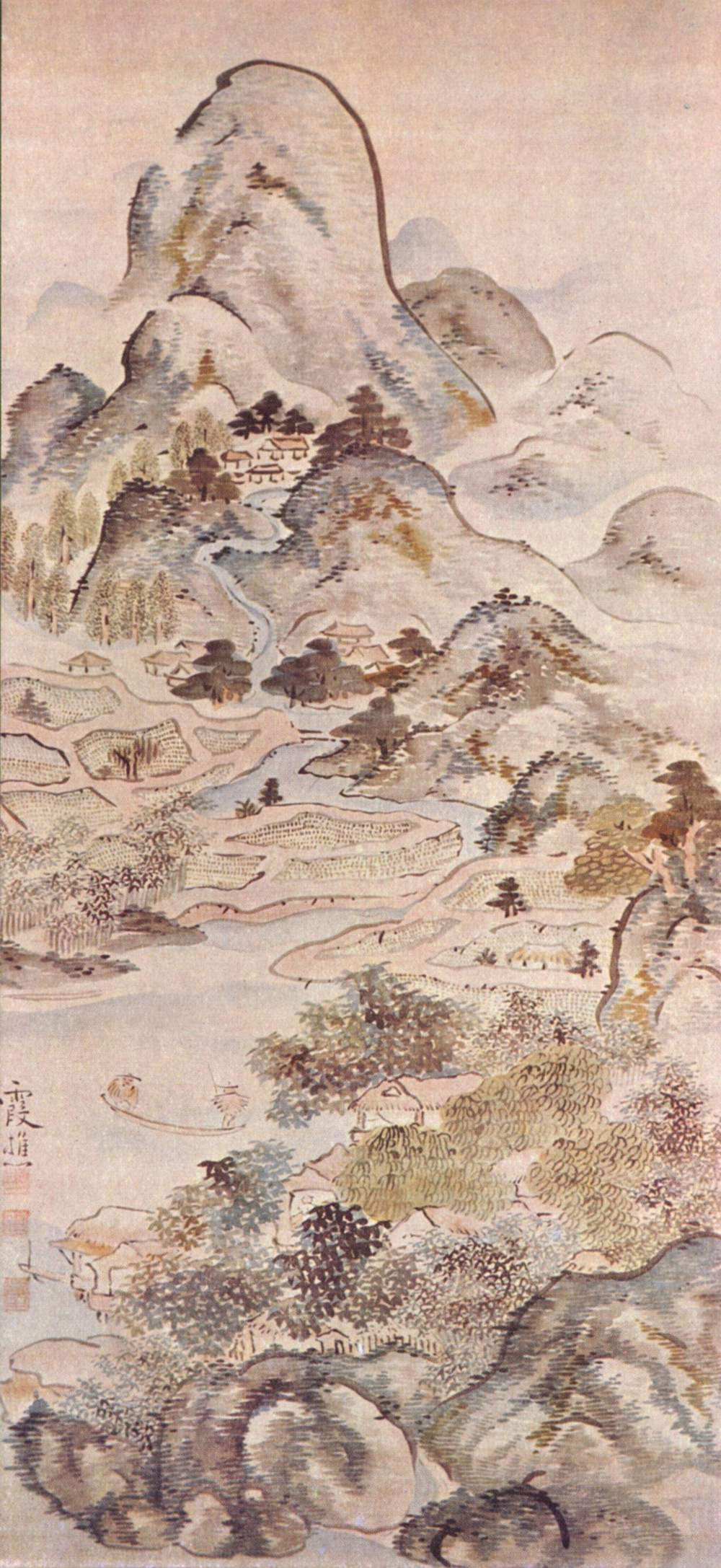
Fishing in Spring by Ike no Taiga

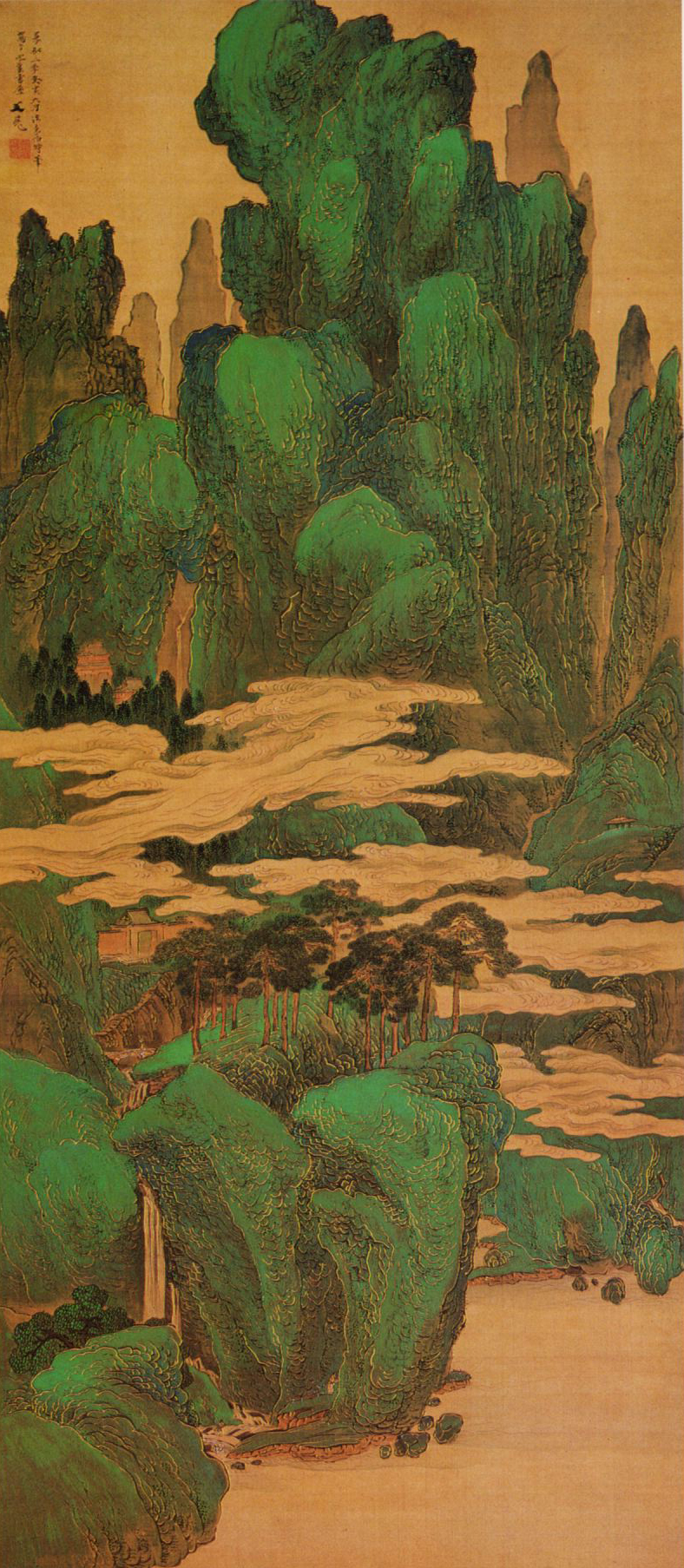
A bluegreen landscape by Tani Buncho, 1807

Nanga (南画, "Southern painting"), also known as Bunjinga (文人画, "literati painting"), was a school of Japanese painting which flourished in the late Edo period among artists who considered themselves literati, or intellectuals. While each of these artists was, almost by definition, unique and independent, they all shared an admiration for traditional Chinese culture. Their paintings, usually in monochrome black ink, sometimes with light color, and nearly always depicting Chinese landscapes or similar subjects, were patterned after Chinese literati painting, called wenrenhua (文人画) in Chinese.

== Etymology ==
The name nanga is an abbreviation of nanshūga, referring to the Southern School (Chinese: 南宗画; pinyin: nán zōng huà) of Chinese painting, which is also called "literati painting" (文人画; wén rén huà).

== History ==
Chinese literati painting focused on expressing the rhythm of nature, rather than the technical realistic depiction of it. At the same time, however, the artist was encouraged to display a cold lack of affection for the painting, as if he, as an intellectual, was above caring deeply about his work. Ultimately, this style of painting was an outgrowth of the idea of the intellectual, or literati, as a master of all the core traditional arts – painting, calligraphy, and poetry.

Due to the Edo period policy of sakoku, Japan was cut off from the outside world almost completely; its contact with China persisted, but was greatly limited. What little did make its way into Japan was either imported through Nagasaki, or produced by Chinese living there. As a result, the bunjin (literati) artists who aspired to the ideals and lifestyles of the Chinese literati were left with a rather incomplete view of Chinese literati ideas and art. Bunjinga grew, therefore, out of what did come to Japan from China, including Chinese woodblock-printed painting manuals and an assortment of paintings widely ranging in quality.

Bunjinga emerged as a new and unique art form for this reason, as well as due to the great differences in culture and environment of the Japanese literati as compared to their Chinese counterparts. The form was to a great extent defined by its rejection of other major schools of art, such as the Kanō school and Tosa school. In addition, the literati themselves were not members of an academic, intellectual bureaucracy as their Chinese counterparts were. While the Chinese literati were, for the most part, academics aspiring to be painters, the Japanese literati were professionally trained painters aspiring to be academics and intellectuals.

Nanga or bunjinga paintings almost always depicted traditional Chinese subjects. Artists focused almost exclusively on landscapes and birds and flowers. Poetry or other inscriptions were also an important element of these paintings, and were often in fact added by friends of the artist, not by the painter himself.

Unlike in other schools of art which have definite founders who pass on their specific style to their students or followers, nanga was always much more about the attitude espoused by the painter and his love of Chinese culture. Thus, as mentioned before, every bunjin artist displayed unique elements in his creations, and many even diverged greatly from the stylistic elements employed by their forebears and contemporaries. As Japan became exposed to Western culture at the end of the Edo period, many bunjin began to incorporate stylistic elements of Western art into their own, though they nearly always avoided Western subjects and stuck strictly to traditional Chinese ones.

Master Kuwayama Gyokushū (1746–1799) was the acutest theorist on Japanese literati painting. In his three books – Gyokushū gashu (Collected works of Gyokushū, 1790), Gaen higen (A Modest Commentary on Painting, 1795) and Kaiji higen (Humble Words on Matters of Painting, 1799) – invited all Japanese literati painters to apply the theories and literati ideals of Dong Qichang (J: Tō Kishō, 1555–1636). According to the scholar Meccarelli, Kuwayama may be considered the ‘Japanese Dong Qichang’, but he mixed both the polychromatic landscapes typical of professional painters and the monochromatic landscapes of literati styles, and he applied a new and more flexible criteria for classification.

Ernest Fenollosa and Okakura Kakuzō, two of the first to introduce Japanese art in any major way to the West, are known to have criticized nanga as trivial and derivative. As a result, the style has only attracted academic attention in the West in recent decades, roughly 100 years later.

== Cultural derivations ==
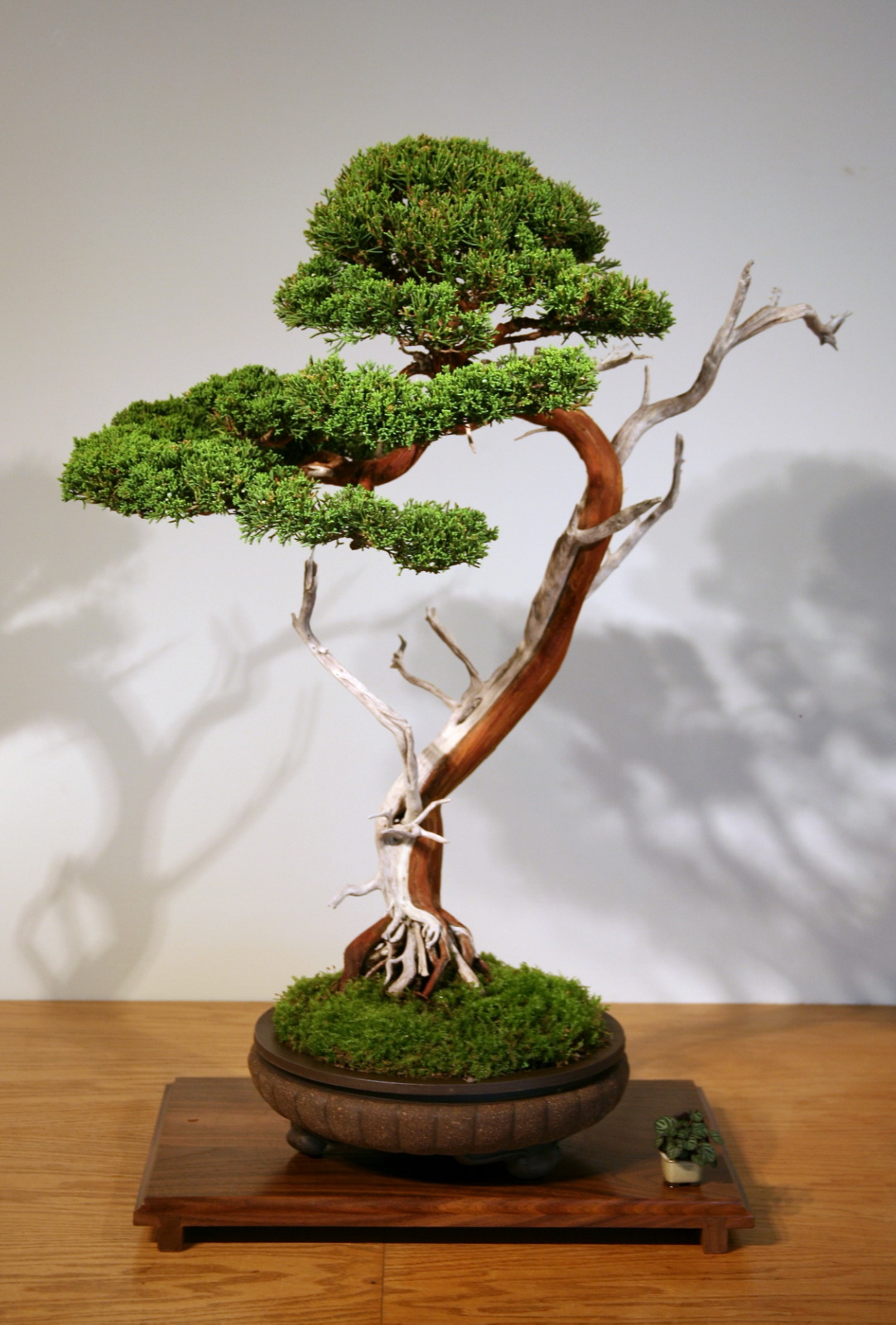
Sargent Juniper arranged in the bunjin style

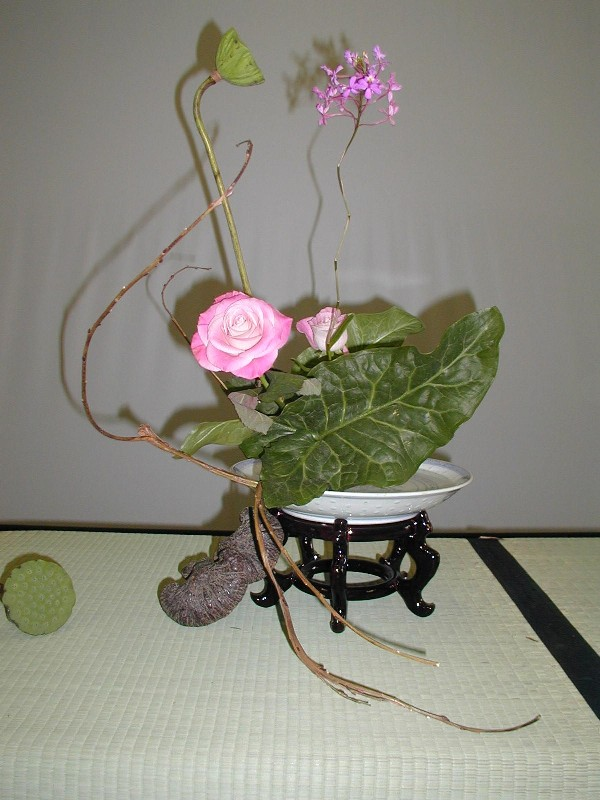
Bunjinbana flower arrangement

A particular style of bonsai is called variously bunjin, bunjingi or "literati" and is intended to look like the trees portrayed in nanga art. Examples of the style are often elegantly elongated and with few branches, being mainly a long slim trunk surmounted by a very small mass of foliage.

The art of flower arrangement ikebana developed the bunjinbana (文人花) style, which was in homage to Chinese landscapes and literati paintings.

== Notable artists ==
- Hanabusa Itchō (1652–1724)
- Yosa Buson (1716–1783)
- Ike no Taiga (1723–1776)
- Kameda Bōsai (1752–1826)
- Tani Bunchō (1763–1841)
- Nakabayashi Chikutō (1776–1853)
- Yamamoto Baiitsu (1783–1856)
- Watanabe Kazan (1793–1841)
- Tomioka Tessai (1837–1924) – widely regarded as the last of the nanga artists

== See also ==
- Nanpin school from Nagasaki
- Southern School
- Senchadō
