= Kyūsu =

Traditional Japanese teapot

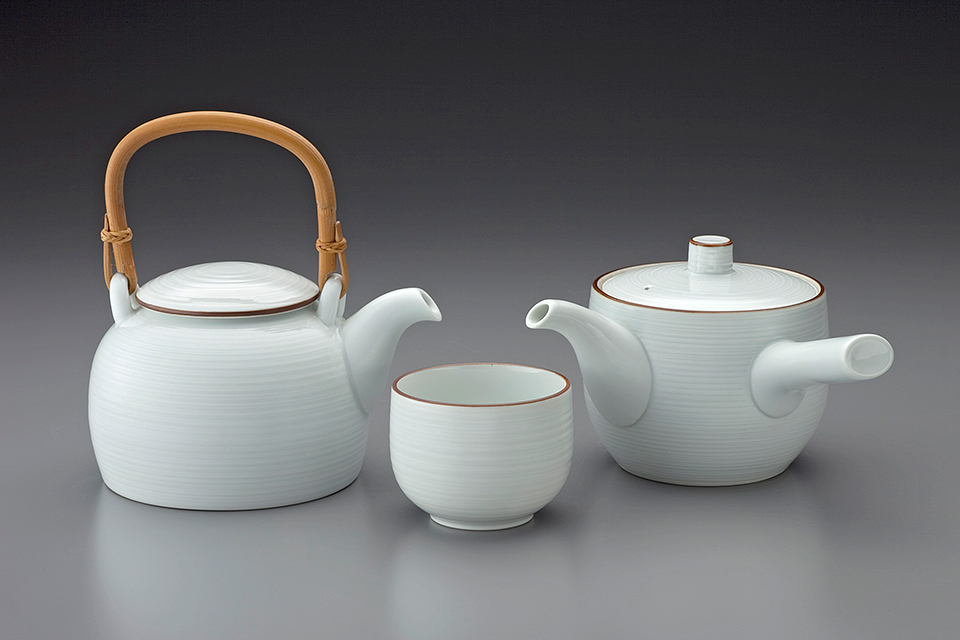
Kyūsu pots with side handle (right) and top handle, design by Masahiro Mori

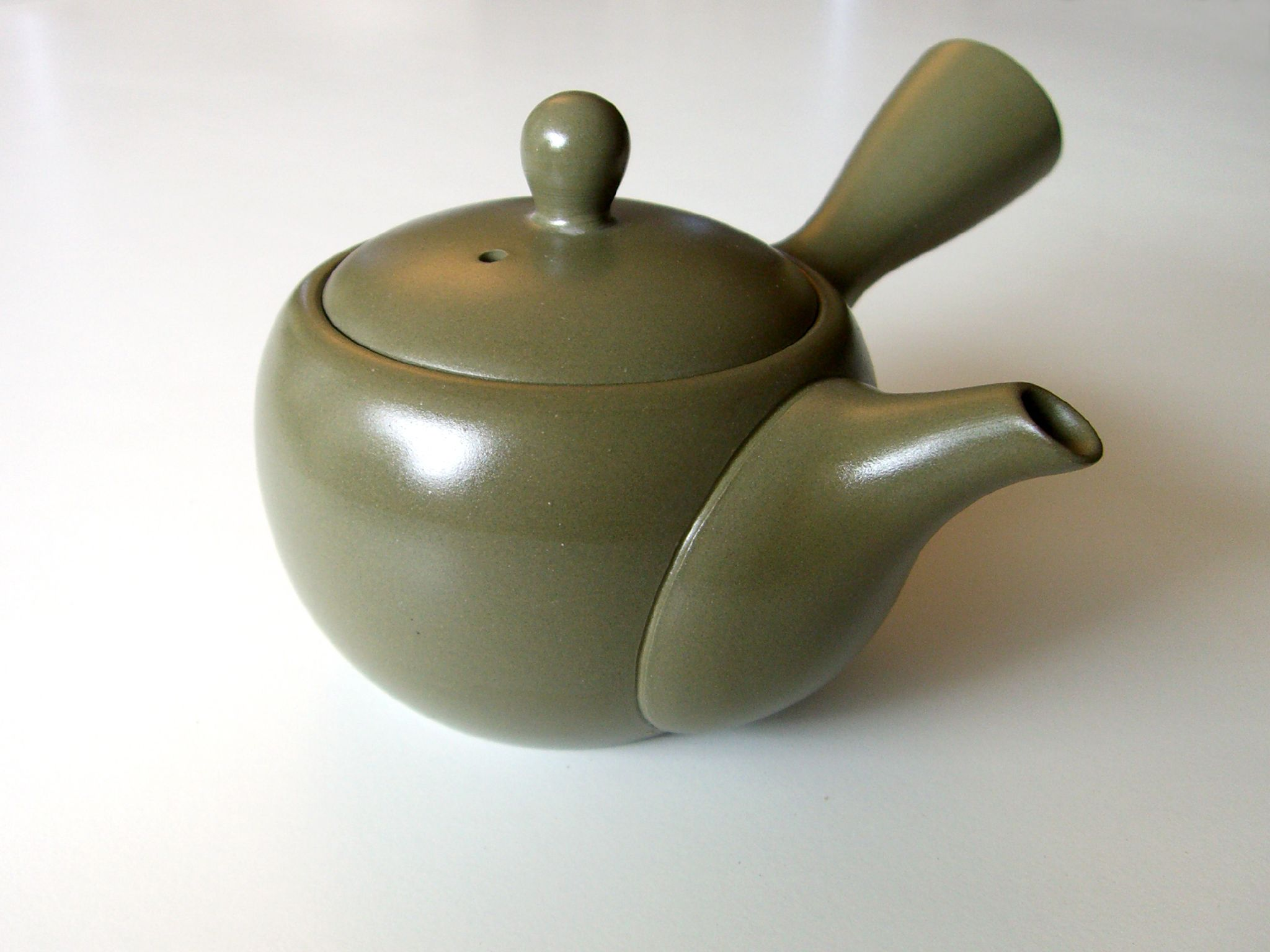
Kyūsu tea pot with side handle

A kyūsu (急須) is a traditional Japanese teapot mainly used for brewing green tea.

The common misconception is that a kyūsu always has a side handle. However, the word "kyūsu" merely means "teapot", even though in common usage kyūsu usually does refer to a teapot with a side handle.

The two most common types of kyūsu are yokode kyūsu (横手急須, side hand(le) teapot), which has a side handle and which is the more common type, and ushirode kyūsu (後手急須, back hand(le) teapot), which has a rear handle, just like teapots in other parts of the world; there are also uwade kyūsu (上手急須, top hand(le) teapot).

Tokoname ware is known for its kyūsu. In smaller types, some of the lids can be crafted in such a way that they will not fall off due to water adhesion. The spout also has to be crafted with an angle that no drops will leak back from it while pouring.

== Gallery ==
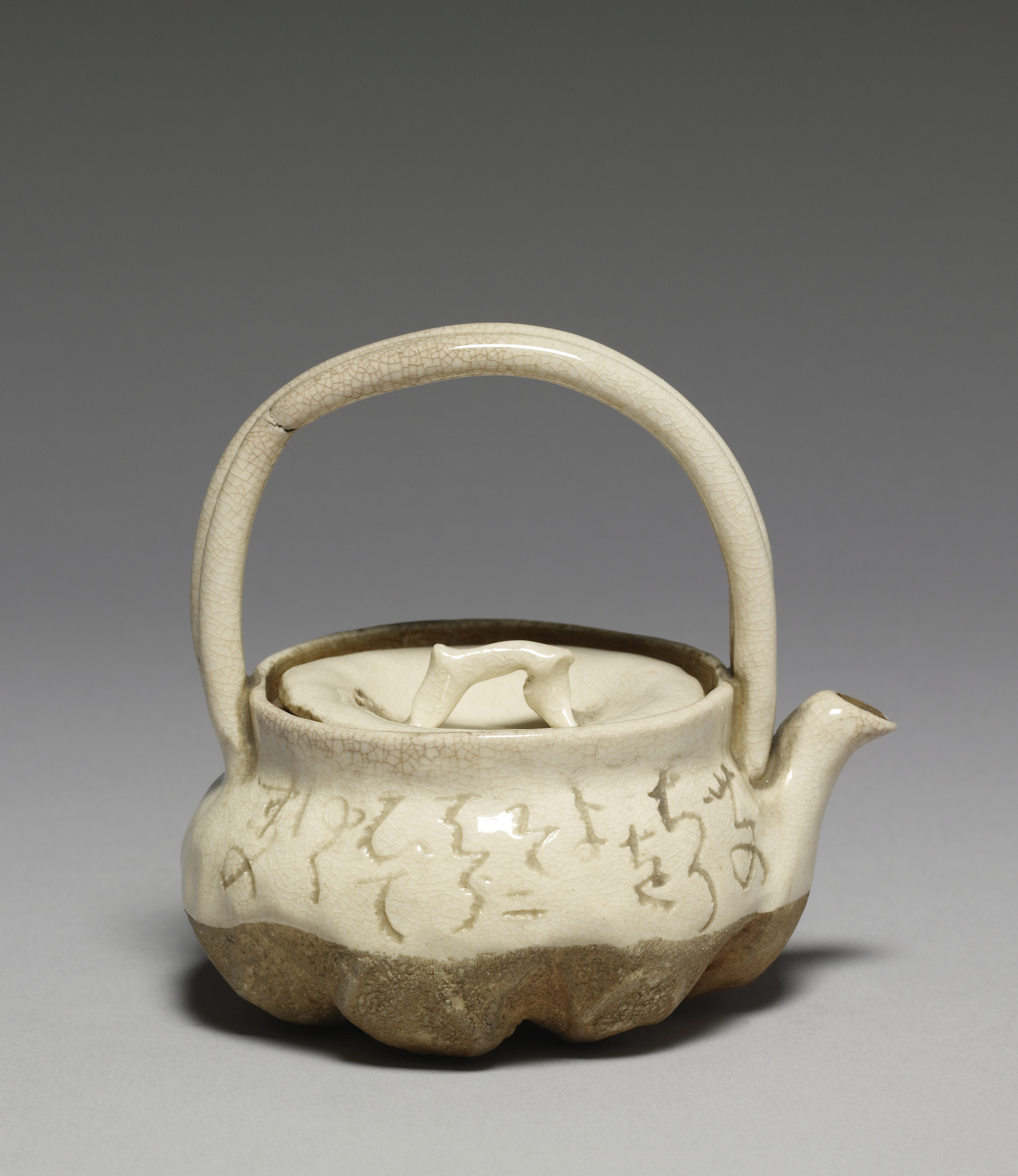
Kyūsu teapot for steeped tea inscribed with a waka poem by Ōtagaki Rengetsu, stoneware with rice-straw-ash glaze, mid-19th century, late Edo period-early Meiji era

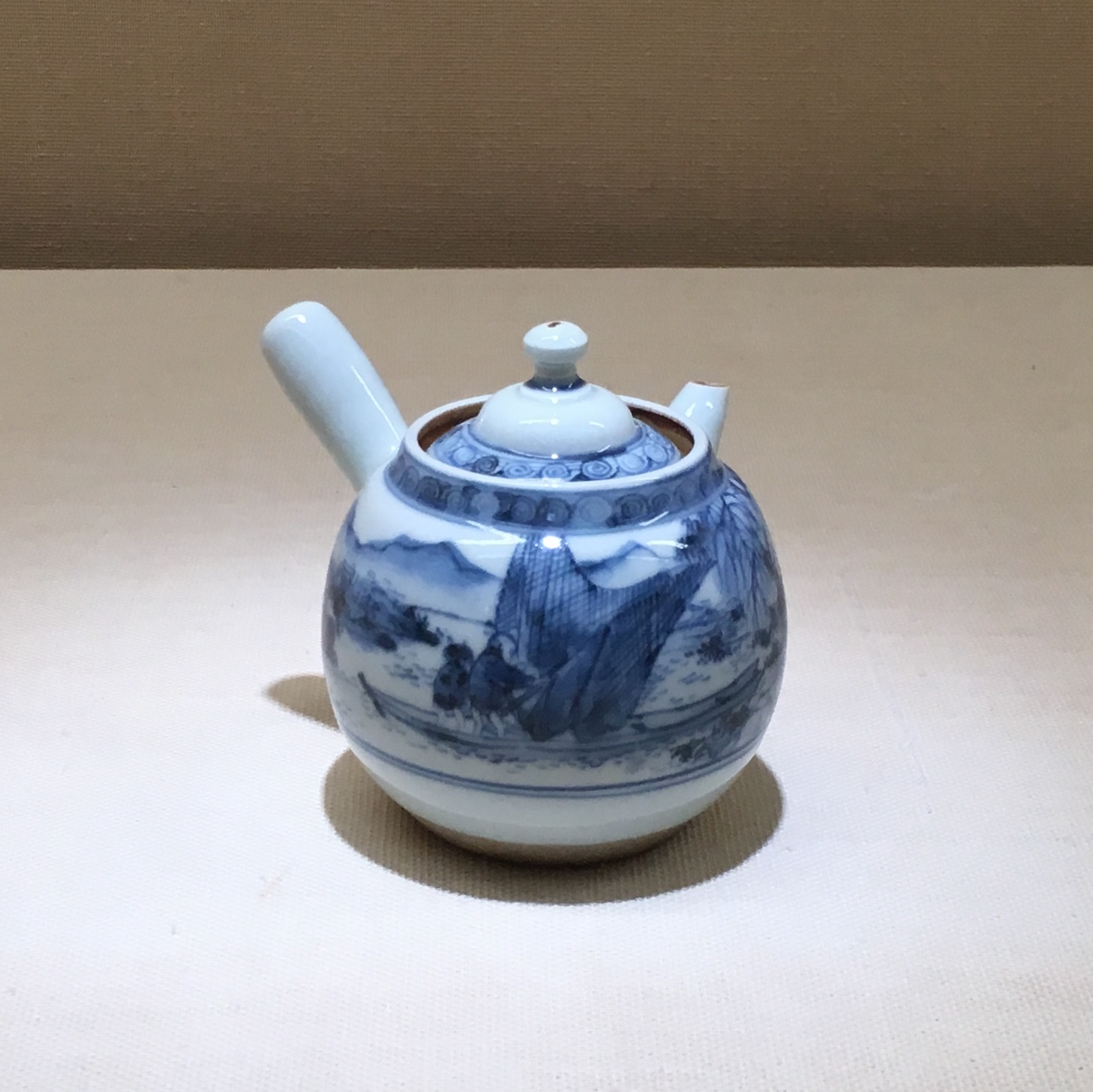
Kyūsu tea pot with sidehandle, design of landscape, underglaze blue, by Mizukoshi Yosobei in Kyoto, late Edo period or the early Meiji era, 19th century

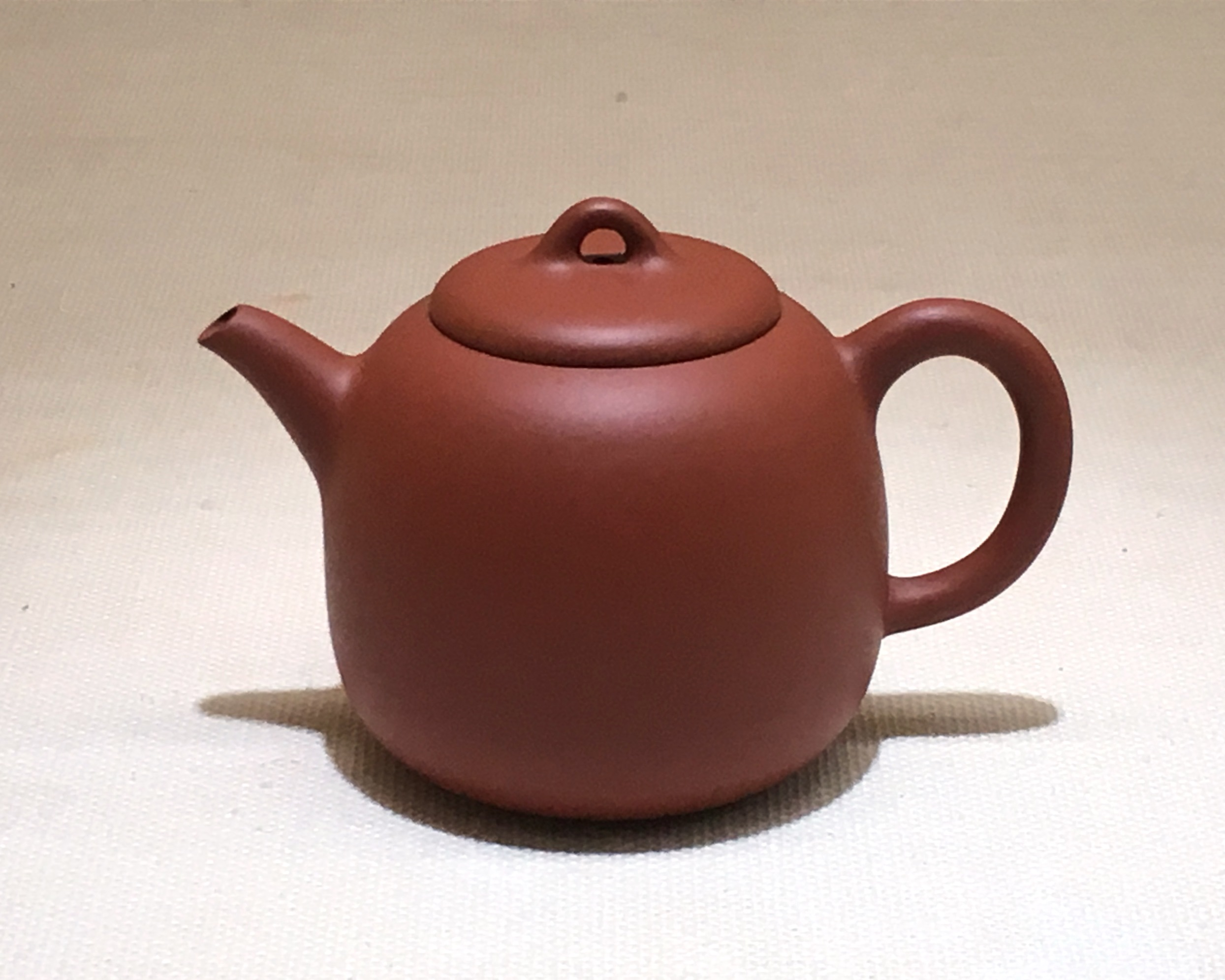
Kyūsu tea pot, Tokoname ware, Taishō era c. 1921 – c. 1925, by Yamada Jozan I

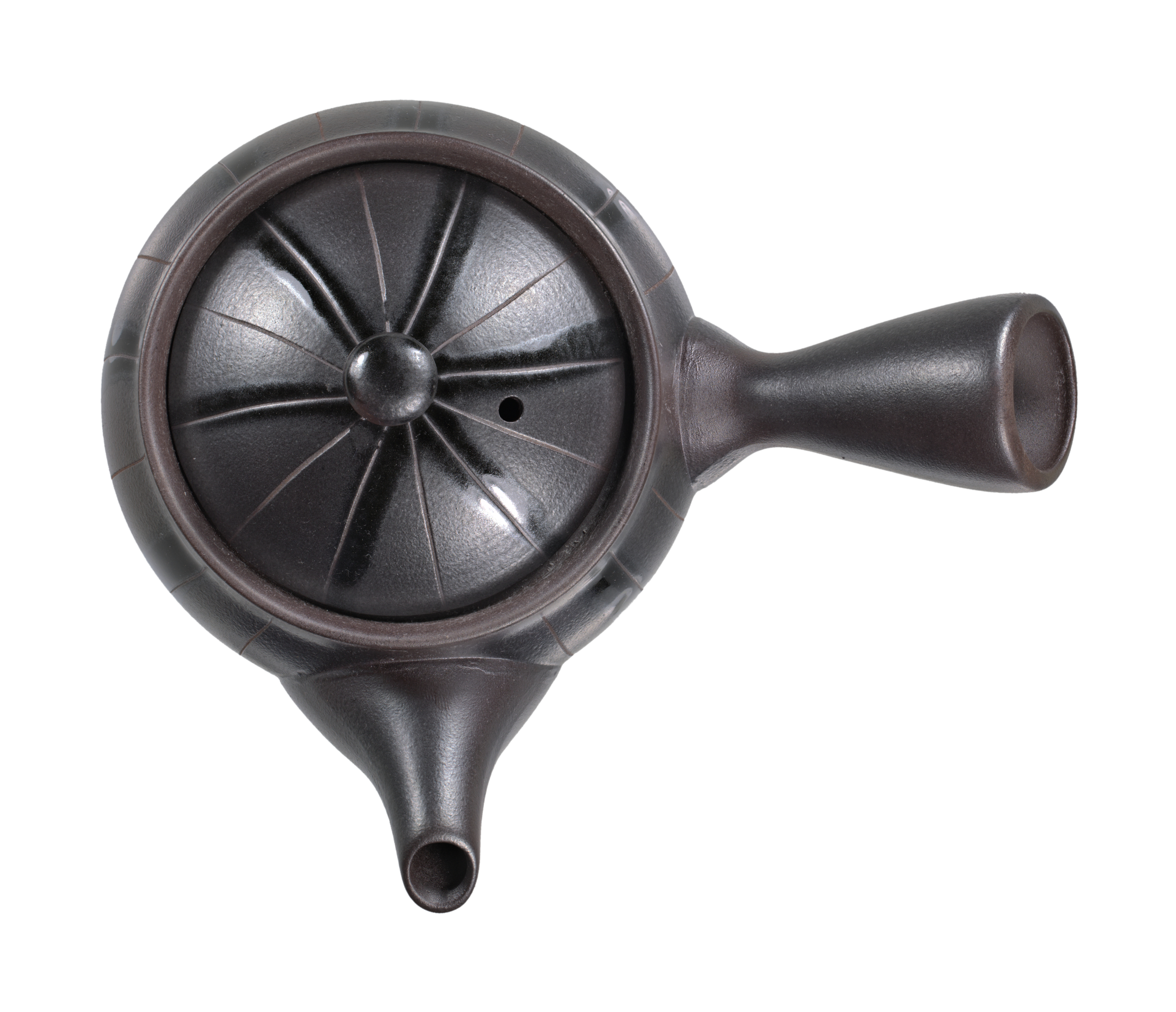
A Kyūsu from above with ...

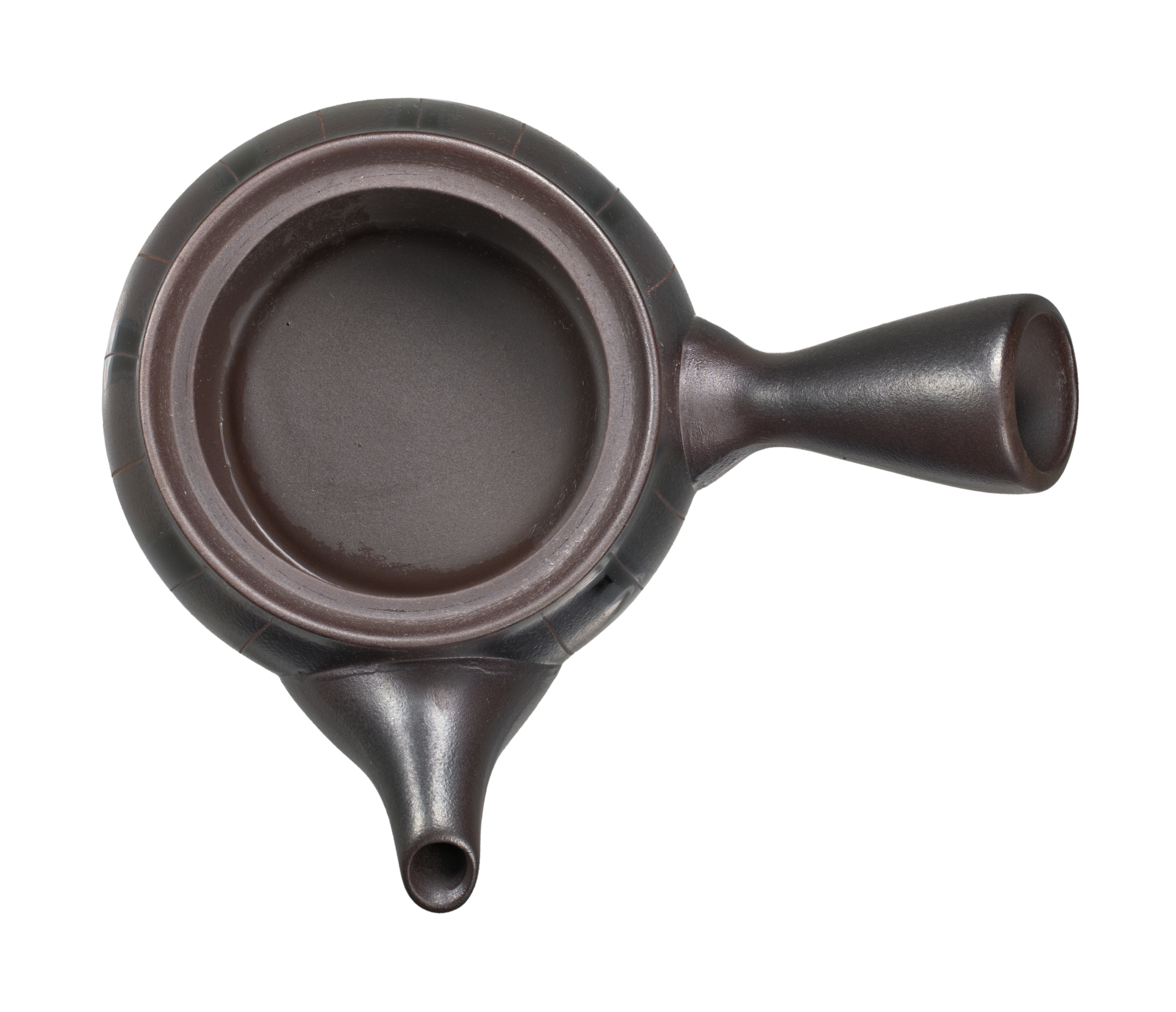
... and without lid

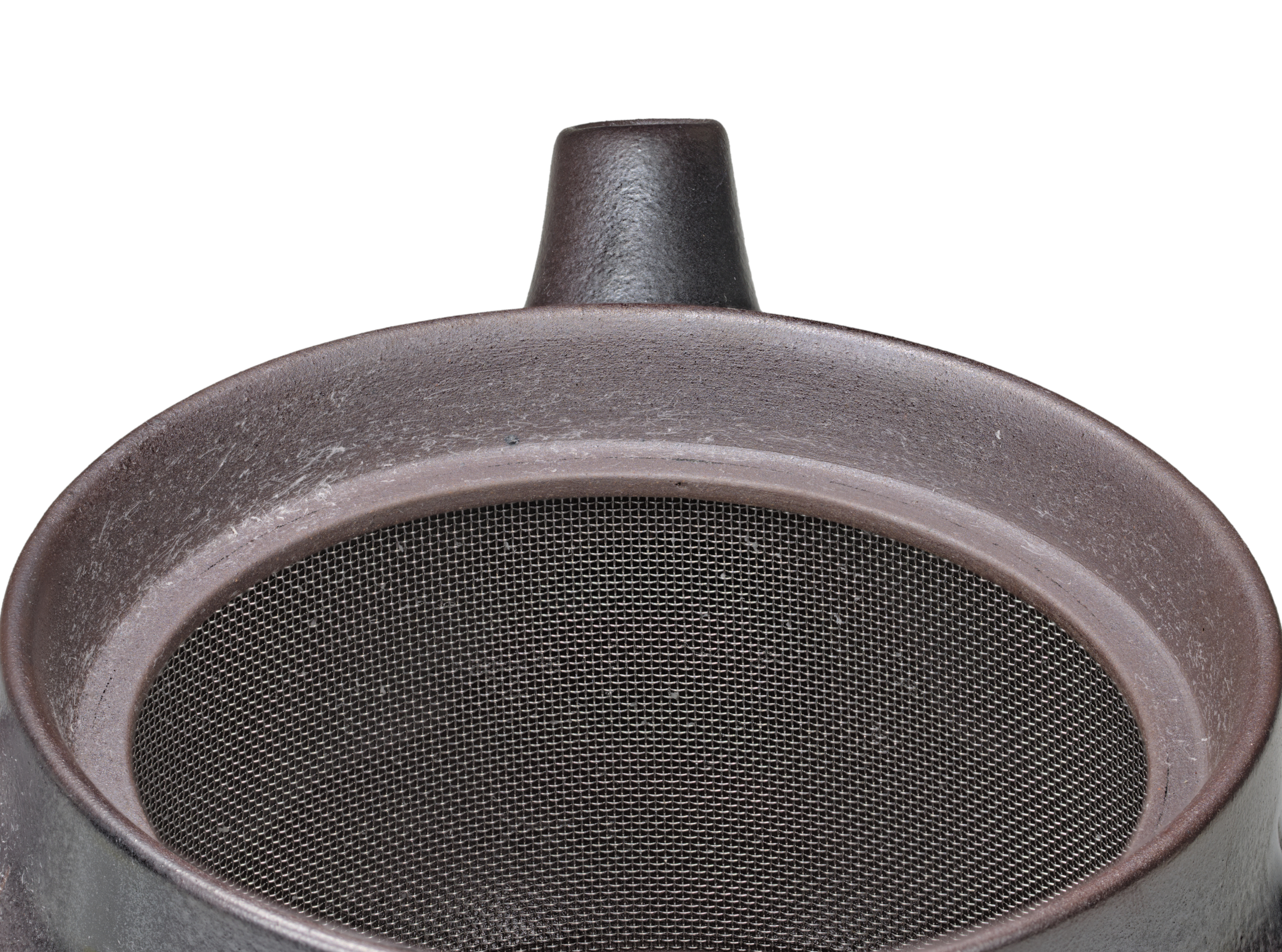
A sieve on the inside of a Kyūsu

== See also ==
- Japanese tea ceremony
- Tetsubin, a cast iron Japanese kettle
