= Yamamoto Baiitsu =

Japanese painter

Yamamoto Baiitsu (山本梅逸) (1783–1856) was a Japanese Edo period painter.

== Biography ==
He was born in Nagoya, son of the sculptor Yamamoto Yumigiemon. His father was in the service of the court of the Tokugawa lords of the Owari Domain.

He was close friends with the painter Nakabayashi Chikuto (1776-1853).

== Works ==
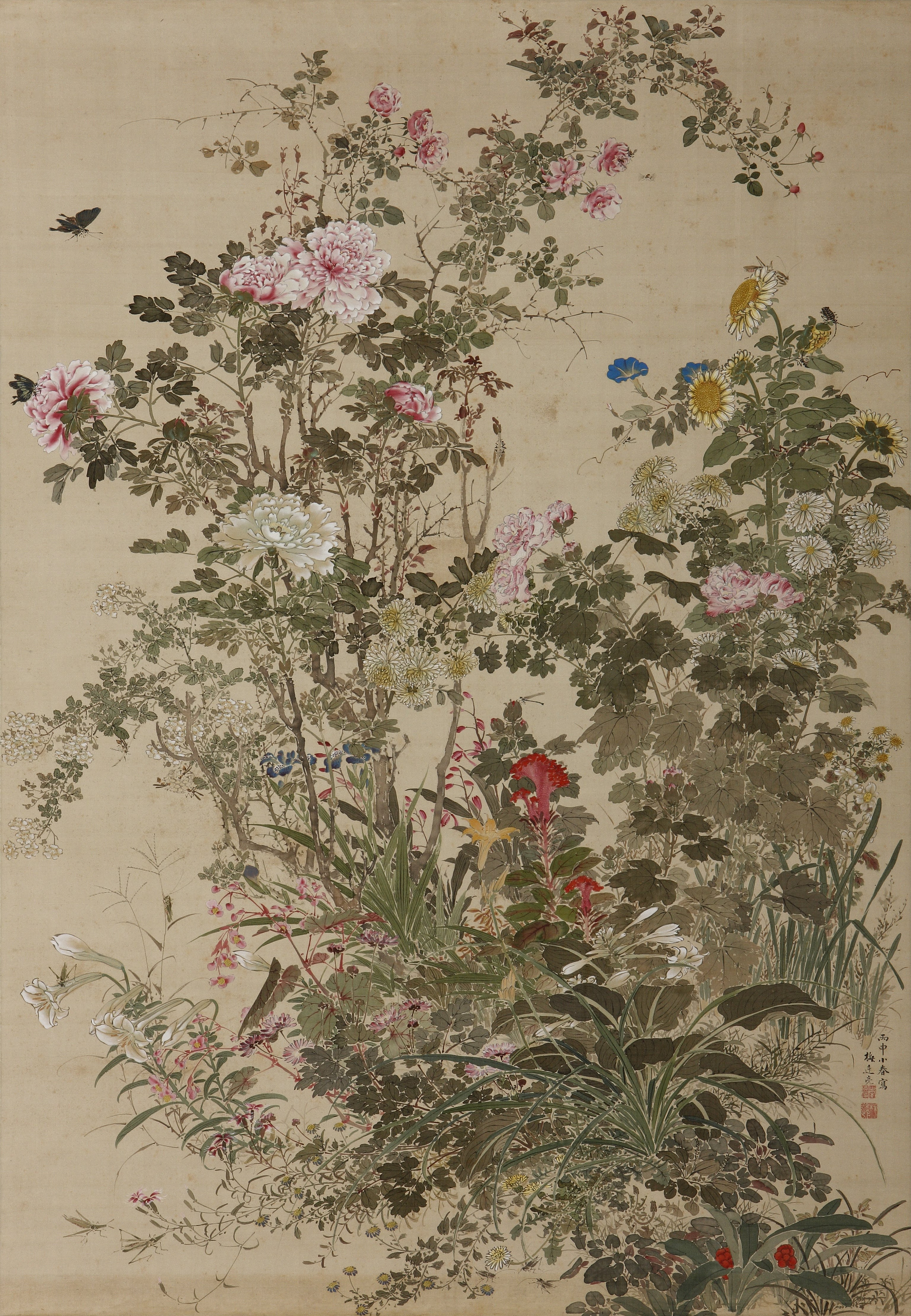
Flowers and Insects, 1836 (Nomura Art Museum)

Two of his paintings have been designated as important cultural property.

His works are held in several museums, including the Metropolitan Museum of Art, the Tokyo Fuji Art Museum, the Minneapolis Institute of Art, the Art Gallery of New South Wales, the Art Gallery of South Australia, the Art Gallery of Greater Victoria, the Denver Art Museum, the Santa Barbara Museum of Art, the Museum of Fine Arts, Boston, the University of Michigan Museum of Art, the Philadelphia Museum of Art, the British Museum, the Portland Art Museum, the Asian Art Museum in San Francisco, the Honolulu Museum of Art, the Walters Art Museum, the Harvard Art Museums, the Fralin Museum of Art, the Cleveland Museum of Art, the Saint Louis Art Museum, the Detroit Institute of Arts, the Phoenix Art Museum, and the Indianapolis Museum of Art.
