= Sinicization =

Assimilation into Han Chinese culture

Chinese name
- Traditional Chinese: 漢化
- Simplified Chinese: 汉化
- Hanyu Pinyin: hànhuà
- Literal meaning: Han-ization
Transcriptions
Standard Mandarin
- Hanyu Pinyin: hànhuà
- Bopomofo: ㄏㄢˋㄏㄨㄚˋ
- IPA: [xân xwâ]
other Mandarin
- Xiao'erjing: هًا خُوَ
Hakka
- Pha̍k-fa-sṳ: Hon-fa
Yue: Cantonese
- Jyutping: Hon3 Faa3
Southern Min
- Hokkien POJ: Hàn-hoa
- Tâi-lô: Hàn-hua

Alternative Chinese name
- Traditional Chinese: 中國化
- Simplified Chinese: 中国化
- Hanyu Pinyin: zhōngguóhuà
- Literal meaning: China-ization
Transcriptions
Standard Mandarin
- Hanyu Pinyin: zhōngguóhuà
- Bopomofo: ㄓㄨㄥ ㄍㄨㄛˊㄏㄨㄚˋ
- IPA: [ʈʂʊ́ŋ.kwǒ xwâ]
other Mandarin
- Xiao'erjing: جوْ قُوَع خُوَ
Hakka
- Pha̍k-fa-sṳ: Chûng-ket-fa
Yue: Cantonese
- Jyutping: Zung1 Gwok3 Faa3
Southern Min
- Hokkien POJ: Tiong-kok-hoa
- Tâi-lô: Tiong-kok-hua

Vietnamese name
- Vietnamese alphabet: Hán hóa Trung Quốc hóa
- Chữ Hán: 漢化 中國化
- Literal meaning: Han-ization; China-ization

Korean name
- Hangul: 한화 중국화
- Hanja: 漢化 中國化
- Literal meaning: Han-ization; China-ization
Transcriptions
- Revised Romanization: hanhwa junggukhwa

Japanese name
- Hiragana: ちゅうごくか
- Kyūjitai: 中國化
- Shinjitai: 中国化
Transcriptions
- Romanization: Chūgokuka

Sinicization, sinofication, sinification, or sinonization (from the prefix sino-, 'Chinese, relating to China') is the process by which non-Chinese societies or groups are acculturated or assimilated into Chinese culture, particularly the language, societal norms, cultural practices, and ethnic identity of the Han Chinese—the largest ethnic group of China.

Areas of influence include diet, writing, industry, education, language/lexicon, law, architectural style, politics, philosophy, religion, science and technology, value systems, and lifestyle.

The term sinicization is also often used to refer to processes or policies of acculturation or assimilation of norms from China on neighboring East Asian societies, or on minority ethnic groups within China. Evidence of this process is reflected in the histories of Korea, Japan, and Vietnam in the adoption of the Chinese writing system, which has long been a unifying feature in the Sinosphere as the vehicle for exporting Chinese culture to other Asian countries.

In recent times, the term "Sinicization" has sometimes been used more narrowly in reference to specific policies of the Government of China towards ethnic minorities as well as the promotion of "ethnic unity".

== Assimilation ==
The assimilation policy is a type of Chinese nationalism aimed at strengthening the Chinese national identity (Zhonghua minzu) among the population. Proponents believe it will help to develop shared values, pride in being the country's citizen, respect and acceptance towards cultural differences among citizens of China. Critics argue that assimilation destroys ethnic diversity, language diversity, and cultural diversity. The historian James A. Millward has claimed that the People's Republic of China has used the concept of sinicization as a means to obscure Han settler colonialism.

In China there are 292 non-Mandarin languages spoken by native peoples of the region. There are also a number of immigrant languages, such as Khmer, Portuguese, and English.

== Sinicizations ==
=== Historical ===
==== Baiyue ====
Before sinicization, non-Chinese indigenous peoples of southern China, collectively termed by the Chinese as Baiyue (Chinese: 百越; lit. 'Hundreds of Yue Peoples'), inhabited the coastline of China from as far north as the Yangtze River to as far south as the Gulf of Tonkin.

As early as the 11th century BC, some of the Baiyue peoples in the Yangtze River Delta started to sinicize, marked by their establishment of the Wu State. These Yue peoples, together with their southerner neighbours who formed the Yue State centuries later, are collectively termed as Yuyue peoples. Over time, the mutual contact between Baiyue peoples and Han Chinese, as well as southward spread of Han Chinese, mostly as war refugees, led to the sinicization of most of the Baiyue populations that remained in southern China, be they in the Yangtze Valley or in coastal areas from the mouth of the Yangtze to the Gulf of Tonkin. The remnants of these peoples who were not fully sinicized are now recognized officially as the ethnic minorities of the People's Republic of China.

==== Mongolic and Turkic peoples ====
Tuoba Wei of northern China was a sinicized empire of Mongolic-Xianbei origin.

Historical Shatuo Turks founded three sinicized dynasties in northern China. Descendants of Buddhist Uyghurs (see also Yugurs, Kingdom of Qocho and Ganzhou Uyghur Kingdom) who migrated to Taoyuan County, Hunan, have assimilated into the Hui population and adopted Chinese culture practice Chinese customs, speaking varieties of Chinese as their language.

==== Han, Jin, and Sixteen Kingdoms period ====
From the late Han dynasty to the early Jin dynasty (266–420), large numbers of non-Chinese peoples living along China's northern periphery settled in northern China. Some of these migrants such as the Xiongnu and Xianbei had been pastoralist nomads from the northern steppes. Others such as the Di and Qiang were farmers and herders from the mountains of western Sichuan of southwest China. As migrants, they lived among ethnic Chinese and were sinicized to varying degrees. Many worked as farm laborers. Some attained official positions in the court and military. The numerous tribal groups in the north and northwest who had been heavily drafted into the military then exploited the chaos to seize power by local Chinese warlords.

During the Three Kingdoms period, Cao Cao initiated the policy of settling Xiongnu nomads away from the frontier near Taiyuan in modern Shanxi province, where they would be less likely to rebel. The Xiongnu abandoned nomadism and the elite were educated in Chinese-Confucian literate culture. The migration of northern Chinese people to the south further settled China as a multi-ethnic empire.

==== Northern and Southern dynasties ====
The Northern and Southern dynasties was a period in the history of China that lasted from 386 to 589, following the tumultuous era of the Sixteen Kingdoms period. Though an age of civil war and political chaos, it was also a time of flourishing arts and culture, advancement in technology, and the spread of Mahayana Buddhism and Daoism. The period saw large-scale migration of Han Chinese to the lands south of the Yangtze. The period came to an end with the unification of all of China proper by Emperor Wen of the Sui dynasty. During this period, the process of sinicization accelerated among the non-Han arrivals in the north and among the indigenous people in the south. This process was also accompanied by the increasing popularity of Buddhism (introduced into China in the first century) and Daoism in both northern and southern China.

==== Tang dynasty ====
During the eighth and ninth centuries in the Tang dynasty, Chinese male soldiers moved into Guizhou (formerly romanized as Kweichow) and married native non-Chinese women, their descendants being known as Lao-han-jen (original Chinese), in contrast to new Chinese people who colonized Guizhou at later times. They still spoke an archaic dialect as of 1929. Many immigrants to Guizhou were descended from these soldiers in garrisons who married non-Chinese women.

==== Yuan dynasty ====
The Mongol-led Yuan dynasty appointed a Muslim from Bukhara, Sayyid Ajall Shams al-Din Omar, as governor of Yunnan after conquering the Bai-led Dali Kingdom. Sayyid Ajall is best known among Chinese for helping sinicize Yunnan province; the promotion of Islam, Confucianism, and Buddhism would be part of his 'civilizing mission' upon the non-Han Chinese peoples in Yunnan, who he viewed as "backward and barbarian."

He founded a "Chinese style" city called Zhongjing Cheng, where modern Kunming is today, and ordered that a Buddhist temple, two mosques, and a Confucian temple be built in the city. The latter temple, built in 1274 and doubled as a school, was the first Confucian temple ever to be built in Yunnan. By incorporating Chinese and consequently Confucian thought in the dynasty, scholars now deem Kublai Khan as an adopted Chinese citizen of Mongol ethnicity, rather than simply being mutually excluded from the definition of fellow Chinese he governed. As such, Sayyid Ajall would be the one to introduce Confucian education, rituals, and traditions into Yunnan, including Chinese social structures, funeral rituals, and marriage customs. He would go on to construct numerous Confucian temples throughout his reign.

Confucian rituals were taught to students in newly founded schools by Sichuanese scholars. The natives of Yunnan were instructed by Sayyid Ajall in such Confucian ceremonies as weddings, matchmaking, funerals, ancestor worship, and kowtow. The native leaders had their "barbarian" clothing replaced by clothing given to them by Sayyid Ajall as well. The governor was praised and described as making "the orangutans and butcherbirds become unicorns and phoenixes and their felts and furs were exchanged for gowns and caps" by He Hongzuo, the Regional Superintendent of Confucian studies.

Sayyid Ajall would also be the first to bring Islam to the area, and thus the widespread presence of Islam in Yunnan is credited to his work. Both Marco Polo and Rashid al-Din Vatvat recorded that Yunnan was heavily populated by Muslims during the Yuan dynasty, with Rashid naming a city with all Muslim inhabitants as the "great city of Yachi." It has been suggested that Yachi was Dali City (Ta-li), which had many Hui people.

Sayyid Ajall's son Nasir al-Din became Governor of Yunnan in 1279 after his death.

Historian Jacqueline Armijo-Hussein has written on Sayyid Ajall's confucianization and sinicization policies in various papers, including in her dissertation "Sayyid 'Ajall Shams al-Din: A Muslim from Central Asia, serving the Mongols in China, and bringing 'civilization' to Yunnan" (1997); and in "The Origins of Confucian and Islamic Education in Southwest China: Yunnan in the Yuan Period" (n.d.) and "The Sinicization and Confucianization in Chinese and Western Historiography of a Muslim from Bukhara Serving Under the Mongols in China" (1989).

==== Ming dynasty ====
During the Ming conquest of Yunnan Chinese military soldiers were settled in Yunnan, and many married the native women.

==== Qing dynasty ====
The rulers of the Qing dynasty were ethnic Manchus who adopted the norms of the Mandate of Heaven to justify their rule. The "orthodox" historical view emphasized the power of Han Chinese to "sinicize" their conquerors, although more recent research such as the New Qing History school revealed Manchu rulers were savvy in their manipulation of their subjects and from the 1630s through at least the 18th century, the emperors developed a sense of Manchu identity and used Central Asian models of rule as much as Confucian ones. There is also evidence of sinicization, however. For example, Manchus originally had their own separate style of naming from the Han Chinese, but eventually adopted Han Chinese naming practices.

Manchu names consisted of more than the two or one syllable Chinese names, and when phonetically transcribed into Chinese, they made no sense at all. The meaning of the names that Manchus used were also very different from the meanings of Chinese names. The Manchus also gave numbers as personal names.

Historical records report that as early as 1776, the Qianlong Emperor was shocked to see a high Manchu official, Guo'ermin, not understand what the emperor was telling him in Manchu, despite coming from the Manchu stronghold of Shengjing (now Shenyang). By the 19th century even the imperial court had lost fluency in the language. The Jiaqing Emperor (reigned 1796–1820) complained that his officials were not proficient at understanding or writing Manchu.

Eventually, the Qing royal family (the Aisin Gioro) gave their children Chinese names, which were separate from the Manchu names, and even adopted the Chinese practice of generation names, although its usage was inconsistent and error-ridden. At the beginning of the nineteenth century, the Manchu royal family stopped using Manchu names.

The Niohuru family of the Manchu changed their family name to Lang, which sounded like "wolf" in Chinese, since wolf in Manchu was Niohuru; thus forming a translation.

Although the Manchus replaced their Manchu names with Chinese personal names, the Manchu bannermen followed their traditional practice in typically used their first/personal name to address themselves and not their last name, while Han Chinese bannermen used their last name and first in normal Chinese style.

Usage of surnames was not traditional to the Manchu while it was to the Han Chinese.

==== Nguyễn dynasty (Vietnam) ====
The Vietnamese Nguyễn emperor Minh Mạng sinicized ethnic minorities such as Khmers, Chams and Montagnards, claimed the legacy of Confucianism and China's Han dynasty for Vietnam. Directing his policies at the Khmers and hill tribes, Minh Mang declared that "We must hope that their barbarian habits will be subconsciously dissipated, and that they will daily become more infected by Han [Sino-Vietnamese] customs." Moreover, he would use the term Han (漢人) to refer to the Vietnamese people, and the name Trung Quốc (中國, the same Chinese characters as for 'China') to refer to Vietnam. Likewise, the lord Nguyễn Phúc Chu had referred to Vietnamese as Han people in 1712 when differentiating between Vietnamese and Chams.

Chinese clothing was also adopted by the Vietnamese people. Variations of them are still being used today.

=== Republic of China ===
==== Ma Clique ====
Hui Muslim General Ma Fuxiang created an assimilationist group and encouraged the integration of Muslims into Chinese society. Ma Fuxiang was a hardcore assimilationist and said that Hui should assimilate into Han.

=== Contemporary ===
==== Xinjiang ====
The Hui Muslim 36th Division (National Revolutionary Army) governed the southern region of Xinjiang in 1934–1937. The administration that was set up was colonial in nature, importing Han cooks and baths, changing the Uyghur-language-only street names and signs to Chinese, as well as switching carpet patterns in state-owned carpet factories from Uyghur to Han.

Strict surveillance and mass detentions of Uyghurs in the Xinjiang re-education camps is a part of the ongoing sinicization policy by the Chinese Communist Party (CCP). Since 2015, it has been estimated that over a million Uyghurs have been detained in these camps. The camps were established under CCP General Secretary Xi Jinping's administration with the main goal of ensuring adherence to national ideology. Critics of China's treatment of Uyghurs have accused the Chinese government of propagating a policy of sinicization in Xinjiang in the 21st century, calling this policy a cultural genocide, or ethnocide, of Uyghurs.

==== Taiwan ====
After the Republic of China took control of Taiwan from the Empire of Japan in 1945 and relocated its capital to Taipei in 1949, the intention of Chiang Kai-shek was to eventually go back to mainland China and retake control of it. Chiang believed that to retake mainland China, it would be necessary to re-Sinicize Taiwan's inhabitants who had undergone assimilation under Japanese rule. Examples of this policy included the renaming of Japanese-named streets with mainland geographical names, the use of Mandarin Chinese in schools and punishments for using other regional Chinese languages, or "dialects" (such as Hakka and Hokkien), and teaching students to revere traditional ethics, develop pan-Chinese nationalism, and view Taiwan from the perspective of China. Other reasons for the policy were to combat the Japanese influences on the culture that had occurred in the previous 50 years, and to help unite the recent immigrants from mainland China that had come to Taiwan with the KMT and among whom there was a tendency to be more loyal to one's city, county or province than to China as a nation.

The process of re-asserting non-Chinese identity, as in the case of ethnic groups in Taiwan, is sometimes known as desinicization. This is an issue in, for example, the Taiwan independence movement and Taiwan localization movements. Australian and Taiwanese scholars argue that the process of nation building in the ROC and the PRC were both Han-centric, but the mainland continues to marginalize minority groups while post-Chiang Taiwan has become more tolerant and inclusive.

==== Tibet ====
The sinicization of Tibet is the change of Tibetan society to Han Chinese standards by means of state propaganda, police presence, cultural assimilation, religious persecution, immigration, population transfer, land development, land transfer, and political reform. According to the U.S. branch of the Offices of Tibet, it has been underway since the Chinese regained control of Tibet in 1951. Sources quoted by Radio Free Asia have stated that in present-day Tibet, traditional Tibetan festivals have "been turned into a platform for propaganda and political theater" where "government workers and retirees are barred from engaging in religious activities, and government workers and students in Tibetan schools are forbidden from visiting local monasteries."

=== Religion ===
In April 2016, CCP general secretary Xi Jinping declared that to "actively guide the adaptation of religions to socialist society, an important task is supporting China's religions' persistence in the direction of sinicization." He later reiterated this plan to the 19th Communist Party Congress saying "We will fully implement the Party's basic policy on religious affairs, insist on the sinicization of Chinese religions, and provide active guidance for religion and socialism to coexist."

Christianity and Islam, alongside with the already sinicized Buddhism, are classified as universalizing religions. This means that their teachings and precepts are not limited to a specific people or culture, and assimilation into new cultures is already something expected in these religious traditions.

==== Protestantism ====
The Three-Self Patriotic Movement (TSPM) of Protestant churches in China has described the Boxer Rebellion and the anti-Christian movement of 1922–1927 as early efforts to sinicize Christianity.

The TSPM and China Christian Council arranged a conference in Shanghai on August 4–6, 2014, commemorating the anniversary of the TSPM. This conference included a seminar on the sinicizaton of Christianity, with Fu Xianwei, chairman of the TSPM, saying "churches in China will continue to explore the sinicization of Christianity [and] ensure Christianity takes root in the soil of Chinese culture, ethnicity, and society... To advance the sinicization of Christianity, churches will need guidance and support from government agencies in charge of religious affairs."

In 2019, TSPM chairman Xu Xiaohong made a pledge to eliminate any Western "imprint" from Chinese faith saying "[We] must recognise that Chinese churches are surnamed 'China', not 'the West'" and "No matter how much effort or time it takes, our resolution in upholding the Sinicisation of Protestantism will never change, and our determination to walk a path that is adapted to a socialist society will never waver."

In December 2023, Wang Huning stated that Christian groups must "adhere to the direction of the sinicisation of Christianity."

==== Catholicism ====
In December 2016, the Ninth National Congress of the Chinese Catholic Representatives reaffirmed their plan for the United Front Work Department's Catholic Patriotic Association to uphold the principle of independence and self-governance, along with the promotion of sinicization.

In March 2018, Archbishop Paul Gallagher, Secretary for Relations with States within the Holy See's Secretariat of State, said that "two expressions or, more precisely, two principles stand out, which should interact with each other, namely "sinicization" and "inculturation." I am convinced that an important intellectual and pastoral challenge arises in an almost natural way from the bringing together of these two terms, which indicate two real visions of the world."

In June 2018, the Bishops' Conference of the Catholic Church in China and the Catholic Patriotic Association issued a "Five-Year Plan on Carrying Forward the Catholic Church's Adherence to the Direction of Sinicization in Our Country". This document calls for Catholics to accept Communist party leadership, love the motherland and obey the state, as well as to embrace the state's directive to implement Chinese cultural integration within Catholicism. Churches in Hebei province and the Yibin Diocese of Sichuan province began holding training seminars immediately.

Cardinal Parolin, the Vatican secretary of state, in a 2019 interview with the CCP-owned Global Times newspaper, claimed that sinicization was a form of 'inculturation', which is a Catholic missionary term that refers to adopting local culture to proclaim the gospel. He cited the 17th century Jesuit missionary Matteo Ricci as an example and pointed out that the Chinese leadership had promised not to undermine the doctrine and nature of each religion. He stated in the interview: "These two terms, "inculturation" and "sinicization," refer to each other without confusion and without opposition: in some ways, they can be complementary and can open avenues for dialogue on the religious and cultural level."

In 2026, a special training session on Sinicization was conducted for representatives from dioceses across China in Beijing. The meeting emphasized the need to implement Xi Jinping thought, rule of law and embrace of Chinese culture within the church. It did not make any reference to Vatican documents or magisterial teachings.

==== Islam ====
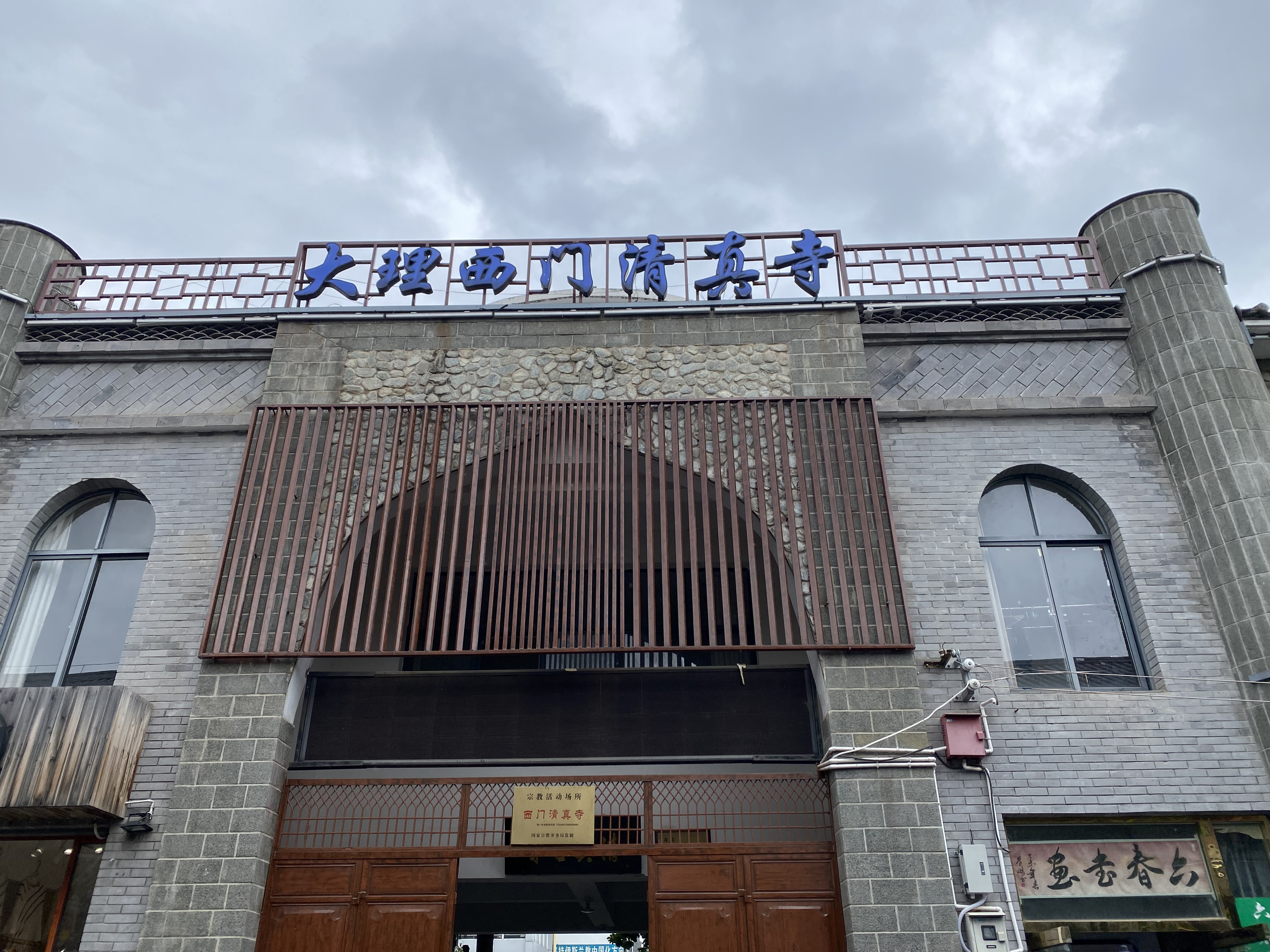
Mosque with dome removed due to sinicization policy

In 2015, CCP general secretary Xi Jinping first raised the issue of "sinicization of Islam". In 2018, a confidential directive was issued ordering local officials to "prevent Islam from interfering with secular life and the state's functions".

Yang Faming, leader of the Islamic Association of China, said in a 2018 speech that "We must allow traditional Chinese culture to permeate Islam and jointly guard the spiritual homeland of the Chinese people." He encouraged Chinese characteristics to be present in religious ceremony, culture, and architecture.

In 2018, over one million Chinese government workers began forcibly living in the homes of Uyghur Muslim families to monitor and assess resistance to assimilation, and to watch for frowned-upon religious or cultural practices. These government workers were trained to call themselves "relatives" and have been described in Chinese state media as being a key part of enhancing "ethnic unity".

As of 2019, it was estimated that Chinese authorities may have detained one and a half million people in secretive re-education camps. The vast majority of those forcibly interned are Muslim Uyghurs but Kazakhs and other minority groups have also been included.

In September 2020, sinicization policies targeted Muslim Utsuls in Hainan province. Restrictions included limiting the size of mosques, requiring a Communist Party member on mosque management committees, forbidding the use of Arabic words on food stalls (such as "halal"), and banning the hijab in schools and government offices.

In June 2023, CNN reported that Chinese authorities had forcibly rebuilt a number of mosques to eliminate traditional Islamic Arabic architecture (e.g. minarets, domes) and replace them with Chinese architecture. In July 2023, the United Front Work Department's Central Institute of Socialism developed a plan to "meld Islam with Confucianism" using the Han Kitab texts as a guide.

== See also ==
- Chinese Rites controversy
- Confucius Institute
- Conquest dynasty
- De-Sinicization
- Ethnic groups in Chinese history
- Little China (ideology)
- New Qing History
- Silk Road transmission of Buddhism
- Sinicization of Tibet
- Sinocentrism
- Sinosphere
- Taiwanese wave
- Zhonghua minzu
- Mongolization
