= Chinese influence on Japanese culture =

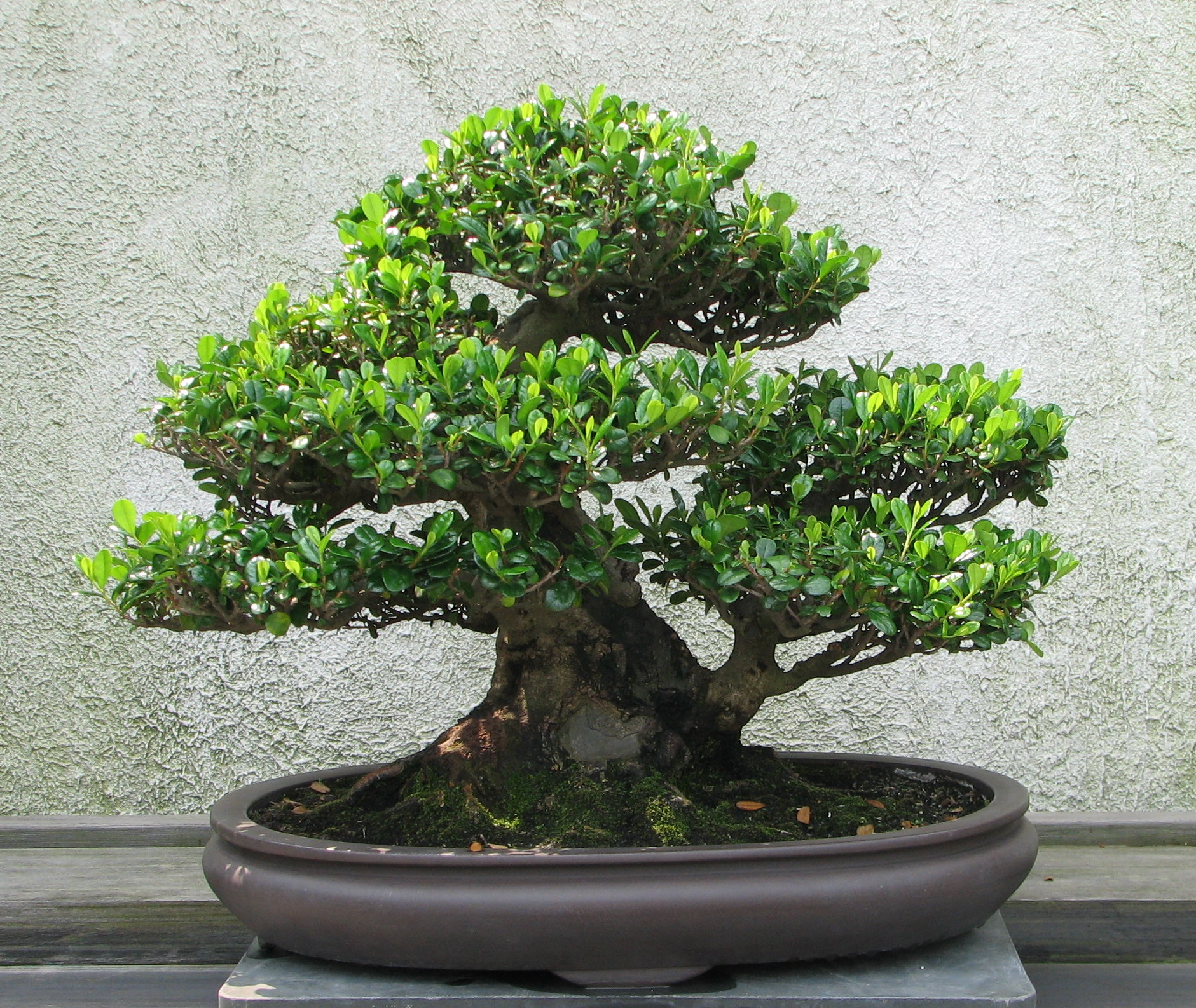
Bonsai, inspired by the Chinese art of penjing

Chinese influence on Japanese culture refers to the historical impact of Chinese culture on Japanese institutions, society, language, political ideologies and rituals as well as other aspects of traditional Japanese culture such as Buddhism and neo-Confucianism, astrology, architecture, literature, art and music, attire and cuisine. Such influences are because as an important part of the Sinosphere, Japan had been profoundly influenced by cultural exchanges with the Chinese Empire, who was the long-running regional hegemon of East Asia, over the course of many centuries until the westernization of Japan since the Meiji Restoration.

== History ==
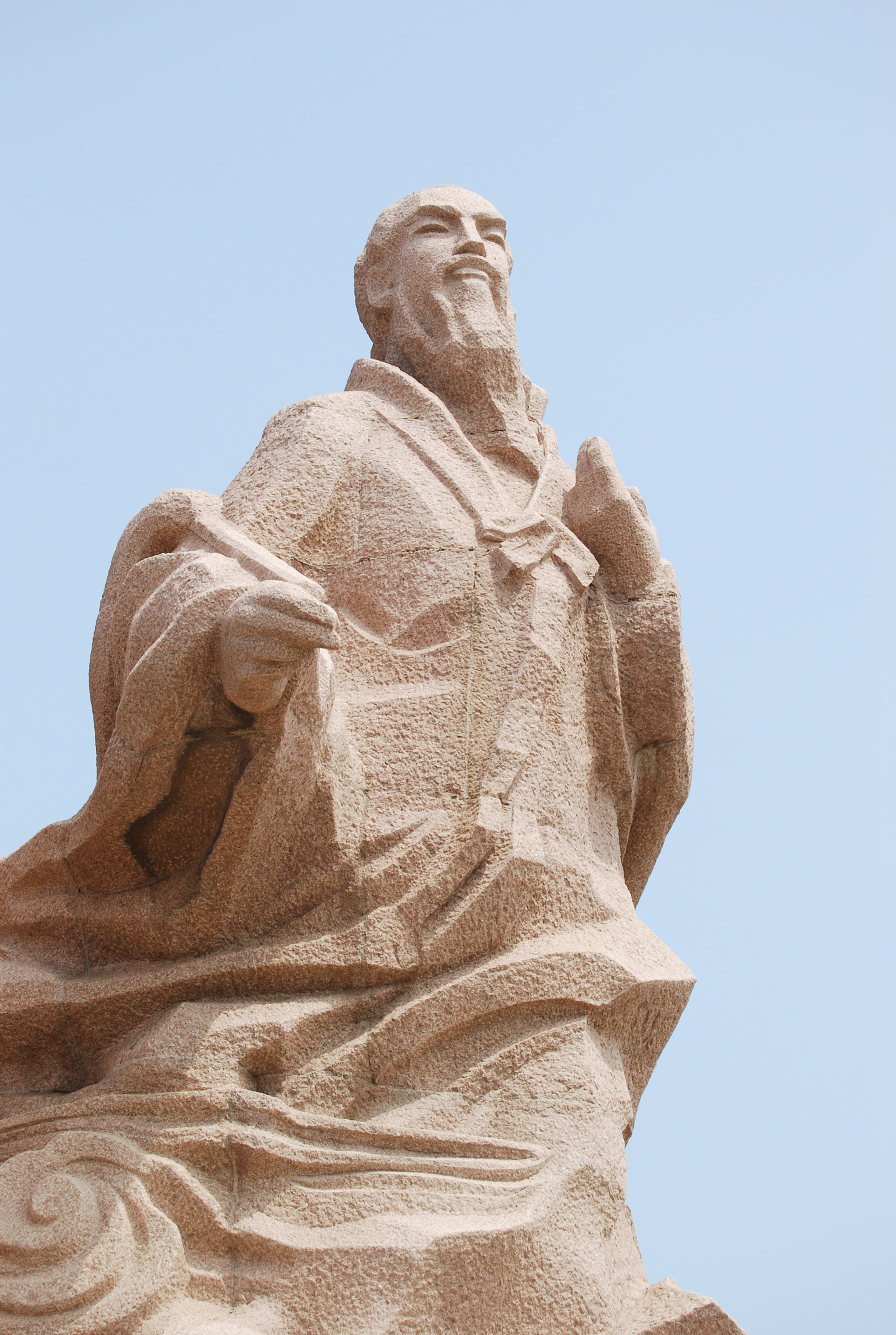
Xu Fu, a legendary Qin dynasty Chinese explorer, was said to have travelled to Japan with an envoy of hundreds of virgin boys and girls in search for the elixir of life, circa 3rd century BCE.

The mass migration into the Japanese archipelago circa 400 BCE from the Asian mainland, more specifically across the Korean Strait from the Korean Peninsula to Kyushu and the Chūgoku region of Honshu, led to conflicts between the indigenous Jōmon people and the immigrant Yayoi people during the later stages of the Jōmon period. These migrations, partly driven by violent wars and regional chaos of the late Eastern Zhou dynasty as well as increasing maritime trade between the East China states and Korean states such as Gojoseon and Jin, brought over "new pottery, bronze, iron and improved metalworking techniques", which helped to improve the pre-existing farming tools and weaponry. This led to a decline of the hunter-gatherer/subsistence fishing lifestyle of the Jōmon period and the rise of more productive wet-rice farming kingdoms of the Yayoi period. Some of these agrarian kingdoms (e.g. Nakoku and Yamatai-koku) later became prominent enough to attempt formalized trade and diplomacy with the great powers on the Asian continent, most notably the now-unified Imperial China, particularly the prosperous Han dynasty (202 BCE–220 AD).

The introduction of Chinese culture, writing system, technologies and religions into Japan was an indirect result of communications and trade with Korea, whose proximity to China proper and the frontier Lelang Commandery allowed it to become the one of first sinicized regions of the Far East along with northern Vietnam (then annexed as the Jiaozhi Commandery). Around the 1st to the 5th century AD, the Three Kingdoms of Korea all had already incorporated major elements of Chinese culture into their own and from there played the middlemen mediating the interchanges between China and Japan.

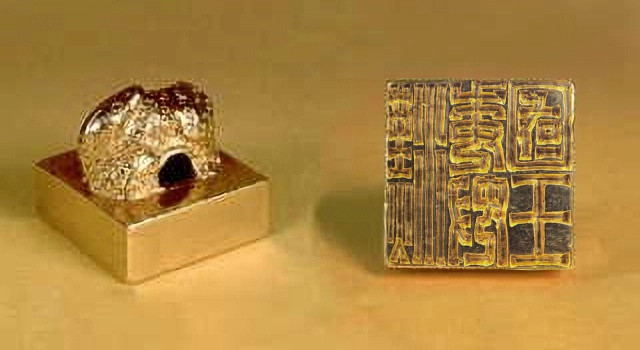
The King of Na gold seal, gifted by the Eastern Han dynasty to the Nakoku kingdom of Yayoi period Japan.

The Book of Han (Han Shu), written in 82 AD, states that the Wa sent envoys and tribute to the Jùn (Chinese commandery) in northern parts of Korea. To expand further, the Wa was a confederation of minor southern and western states of Japan, with an emphasis on the state of Yamatai. According to the Han Shu, this was the first textual reference made to Japan in reference to Sino-Japanese interaction. Another Chinese source that documents Chinese influence on Japanese culture is the Record of Wei (Wei Chih), written in 297 AD, which states that Chinese and Japanese interactions of tribute originates back to 57 and 107 AD. Prominent figures of authority, such as Queen Himiko, sent Japanese ambassadors to parts that belonged to the Chinese in around 189–248 AD. That continued in the Kofun period, as envoys continued to be transmitted from Japan into China. In 502 AD, eleven new envoys were sent to China. That was, according to Mark Cartwright, the emergence of Yamato Japan as an international diplomatic state.

Kentōshi route, the diplomatic sea route from Asuka/Nara period Japan to Tang dynasty China.

The traditional Japanese kimono can be traced back to the 7th century when the Japanese Imperial Court and aristocracy started to wear garments adapted from traditional Chinese clothing. Gofuku, a term for the more high-end silk kimonos, refers to the dress of the ''Go'' (呉, or ''Wu'' in Chinese) style, which refers to the original Wu region.

Like Korea, Japan had cherry-picked and purposefully regulated its intake of cultural influence (or "cultural borrowing") from China. This meant that it "acknowledged the cultural superiority of the Chinese Middle Kingdom" but always held onto its cultural and political independence. In addition to controlling the process of cultural borrowing, Japan also remained very selective in considering the ideas and institutions that it wanted to adopt.

=== Modern influence ===
China's continued influence on Japanese culture can be perceived in modern times perhaps most clearly in the field of gastronomy of which Japanese Chinese cuisine (particularly dishes such as ramen and gyōza) is an example. Influence from Taiwan was also felt with the popularity of bubble tea in the late 2010s.

== Influence on religion ==
=== Daoism/Taoism ===
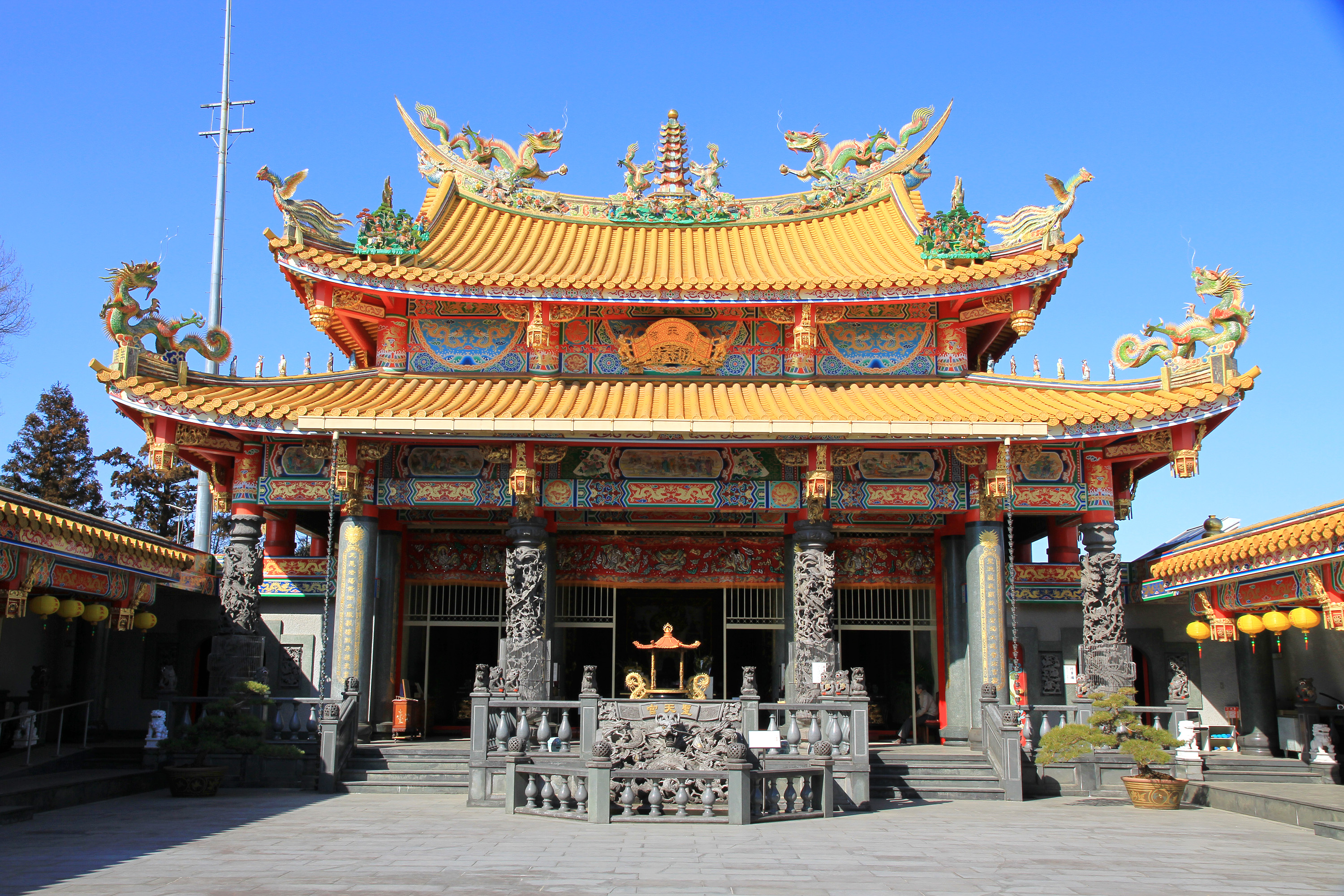
Taoist Temple known as Seitenkyū, located in Sakado, Saitama

Daoism/Taoism is a set of religious and philosophical beliefs that explores the ideas of rituals, scriptures all while the Dao/Tao is considered. It can be traced back to the 3rd century BCE. As a product of Chinese philosophers, it has made its way to Japan and thus was significantly changed as it became in contact with Japanese Culture. Originally, as Daoism developed in China was complex, multifaceted and a continuous recreation of new and old ideas. Its form as it became integrated into Japanese culture was introduced as a part of the ritsuryō state. As a result, through textual pieces, Daoism marketed its way gradually into Japanese culture but differently from its original influence, which was Chinese Daoism.

==== Debates regarding Daoism/Taoism ====
There have been debates regarding which undefined elements of Daoism within "the Japanese religio-political landscape" belongs to history and traditions of China and which are merely an aspect of Daoism itself. Author and research associate Gaynor Sekimori, argues that aspects such as cosmology, yin and yang, Wu Xing (the five phases), divination, astronomy/astrology and the Yijīng were originally a part of Chinese cultural heritage, which thus influenced Daoism.

There has also been a level of uncertainty regarding Daoism on whether it is mostly Chinese culture or was only influenced by Daoism. Jonathan Smith claimed to distinguish what is part of Chinese heritage and that of Daoism itself and that some elements are "Daoist" and "Taoist-flavoured".

Building on the concept, the Japanese philosopher Miura Kunio distinguishes specific elements of Daoism as either belonging to the Chinese culture or as aspects transferred into the Japanese culture after the introduction of Daoism. Kunio further claims that elements that were presented to Japan in the seventh century, such as "calendar-making, astronomy/astrology and divination", belonged to the Chinese culture. Elements such as beliefs of immortality, Daoist scriptures and the Kōshin cult were transferred into Japan as part of Daoism.

=== Buddhism ===
Now one of the largest world religions, Buddhism first emerged from India around 6th century BC. Buddhism has three major branches, which include Theravada ("School of the Elders" Buddhism), Mahayana (or 'Greater Vehicle' Buddhism) and Vajrayana (Esoteric Buddhism or 'Diamond Vehicle'). Buddhism was brought over to Japan through China and Korea in 552 CE.

Furthermore, Buddhism was encouraged by those in power, such as Prince Shōtoku. He argued that Buddhism was essential in "promoting Chinese ideas". Out of the three branches of Buddhism, it was the Mahayana that first became rooted in the Japanese culture. In particular, Chan Buddhism, a Chinese school of Mahayana, spread to Japan as Japanese Zen.

==== Introduction and establishment of Buddhist sects ====
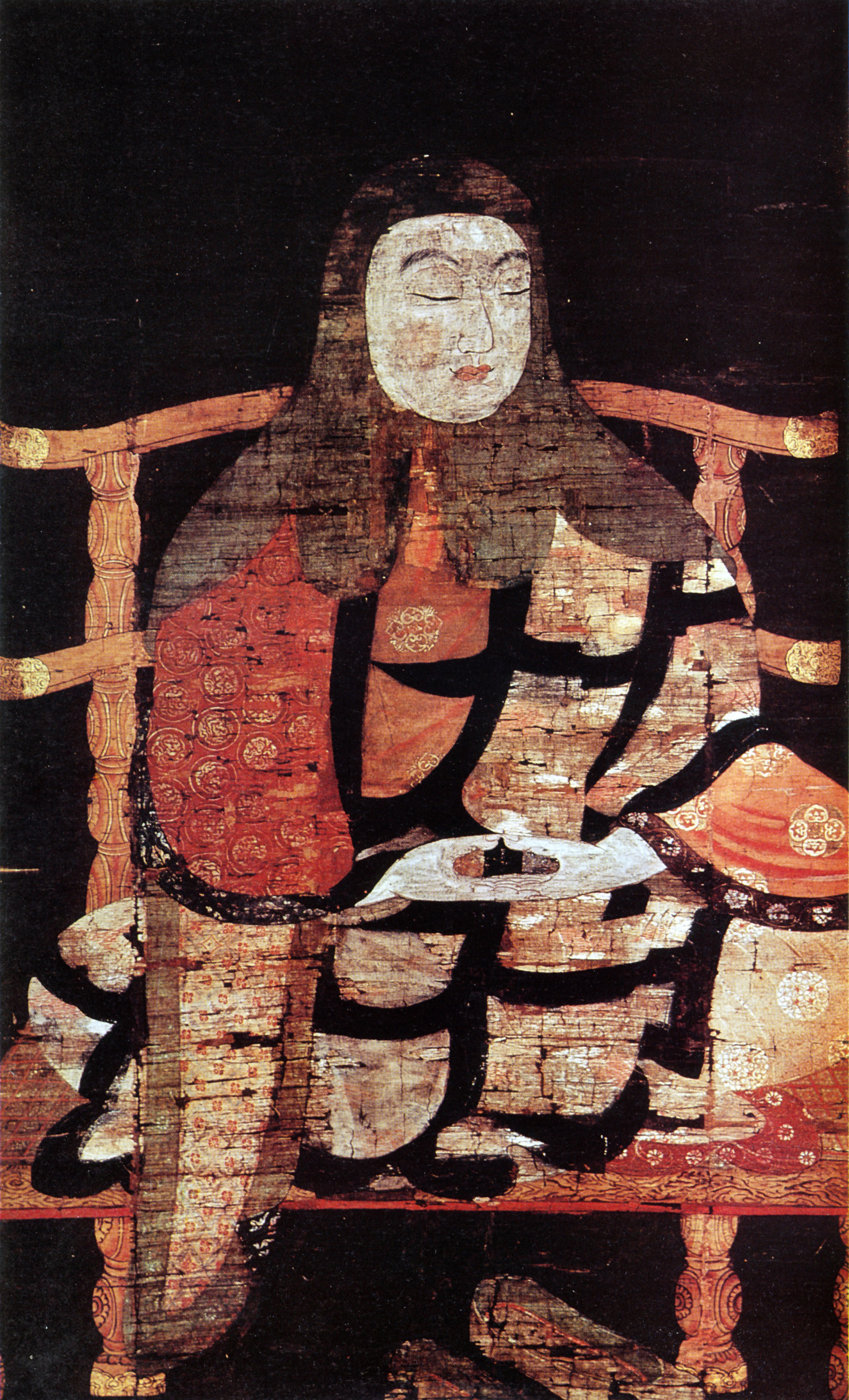
Visual painting of Saichō

Another example of Chinese influence on Japanese religion is the introduction of Vajrayana Buddhism. In the early the Heian period, several Japanese monks who had studied religion in China returned and established Vajrayana Buddhism by the creation of Buddhist sects. Specifically, two scholar monks, known as Saichō and Kūkai, helped to create the Tendai sect and Shingon sect. The Tendai sect was created in 805 by Saichō following his return from the Tang dynasty of China, and he helped to establish Vajrayana firmly.

Saichō then traveled to China for eleven months in 804 on the quest for the T'ien-t'ai (or Tiantai), the Chinese Buddhist School. Saichō wanted to transfer the idea of the T'ien-t'ai Dharma heritage into Japan but to keep the authenticity of the original Chinese-based Buddhist school. In his final month in Ming-chou, Saichō went to Yüeh-chou to gather further religious texts concerning esoteric Buddhism (Vajrayana). There, he essentially met the priest Shun-hsiao, who informed and instructed him on Vajrayana Buddhism. After his visit to Yüeh-chou, Saichō retrieved Buddhist instruments related to rituals, paintings of the goddesses of Vajrayana, and 38 religious texts related to Mikkyō. In accordance to several pieces historical research, "both inside and outside the Tendai school demonstrates that Saichō encounter with Mikkyō in China was rather accidental". Furthermore, according to the Japanese historian Kōyū Sonoda, Saichō's original plan was sending two disciples to do his research on the T'ien-t'ai, but it was changed last minute since Emperor Kanmu was able to persuade Saichō to pursue and lead the journey personally.

From there, Saichō helped to "pave the way" for the Shingon sect to be introduced in 806 by Kūkai. For both founders to benefit from the introduction of Buddhism, Saichō stood behind Kūkai and helped him get the mountain temple of Takaosan-ji, northwest of Kyoto, and make it into the original Shingon School. In return, Kūkai helped educate and train Saichō and his followers Vajrayana rituals. Furthermore, Kūkai also shared his Mikkyō texts, which he had gotten during his final trip to Yüeh-chou, China.

== Influence of Chinese astronomy ==
A professor at Doshisha University, Kazuhiko Miyajima, argues that Japan was heavily influenced by Chinese astronomy and astrology. The Japanese learned about Chinese astronomy first from the Koreans, who had learned it directly from the Chinese. The influence of astronomy took roots in government offices as a direct influence of the Chinese model, which became known as "Onmyo no tsukasa". That office was in charge of specific information related to both astronomy and astrology, the same fields being part of Daoism. The four departments of the office were "divination by celestial omens, calendar-making time-keeping and yin-yan divination". The responsibility of the departments was similar to the Chinese equivalents: T'ai shih chu and T'ai-pu shu.

In terms of cardinal direction, the orientation of the main streets in cities like Naniwa no miya and Heijo Kyo was achieved by "learning the Chinese way of surveying".

In addition, Japanese star maps were influenced by Chinese astronomy, as several star maps in Japan held the same Chinese star names. They were created as direct copies from the Chinese, but only a few still remain popular. Shibukawa Harumi, known as the "first official astronomer of the Edo period", published two kinds of star maps, which were adapted from the traditional Chinese model, which came from Korea. Some star maps were created by Takahashi Kageyasu and Ishizaka Joken and are still inspired by western astronomy, which essentially landed in Japan through China by the book "T'ienching huomen". The book's popularity in China was short-lived because of its simplification, excessive mistakes and inaccuracy, but it was immensely popular in Japan.

== Influence of Chinese Medicine ==
Traditional Chinese medicine (TCM) is a system of theories, diagnosis, and disease treatments, and it was brought to Japan during the Edo Period. Shanghanlun (also known as the Treatise on Febrile Diseases and Miscellaneous Diseases) is a classical TCM text that contains medical treatments and natural materials used for remedies. Through this text and TCM, Japan created kampo medicine which is a simplified version of TCM and focused primarily on herbal medicine, acupuncture, and acupressure. Although both TCM and kampo are considered herbal medicine, TCM focuses on the theories of diseases and not the patient's symptoms like kampo does.

Through the exchange of medicinal knowledge, the Gosei and Koho Schools were founded for research on medicine. Chinese and Korean medicine were analyzed at the Gosei School. Shanghanlun research was conducted at the Koho School. Here, Japanese physicians promoted ancient Chinese learning and combined Confucianism with Chinese and Japanese medicine.

== Language ==
=== Wordstock ===
According to the Shinsen Kokugo Jiten (新選国語辞典) Japanese dictionary, kango comprise 49.1% of the total Japanese wordstock.

=== Kanji: Usage of Chinese characters in Japan ===
Kanji is the term for adopted Chinese characters used in written Japanese. The Chinese writing system influenced spoken Japanese language first and thus "provided key vehicles for intellectual creativity". Its origin in Japan dates back to the Kofun period, and its introduction is believed to have occurred between 300 and 710 AD.

It is believed that the Japanese writing system came under influence by the Chinese through its written language. In the beginning, most writing in Japan was done by immigrant clerks who wrote in Chinese. One individual in particular, known as Wani, helped to introduce the Chinese characters into Japan. Wani was a scholar that had arrived sometime during the late 4th century from one of the Korean kingdoms, Paekche (also known as Baekje). He supposedly brought 11 volumes of Chinese writings with him to Japan. Wani remained in Japan and helped to inspire groups of scribes that later became known as the Fumi-no-obito. Literacy was rare and was limited to immigrant groups and their families during the 5th and the 6th centuries. The act of writing and learning Chinese was instigated in Japan in the early 5th century.

Within the 7th century, Japanese scholar-aristocrats began to learn Chinese reading and writing with the purpose of doing business.

The adoption of Chinese characters was said to be challenging, but its outcome allowed Yamato Japan to establish a bureaucracy. It also helped Japanese authority figures gain control of clans and peasants. Moreover, the introduction of Chinese into Japanese broadened Japan's access to educational texts on ranging subjects, such as science, religion, art, and philosophy. Consequently, as Japanese students began to master Chinese, they could travel to China and thus continue to learn about the language and culture.

It has been said that the introduction of Chinese characters and learning in the 4th century AD highlighted a grand "turning point in Japanese cultural development".

== Government ==
Nakatomi no Kamatari created the clan known as Fujiwara in 645. It stayed in power until the 11th century, when the military class (or the samurai) assumed its position. After the Fujiwara clan, the Taika reforms were created in 646 and helped to create a new system of government, which was influenced by the Chinese model. Land became purchased by the state and thus was to be redistributed fairly to all. The land reform was a gateway for "introducing the new tax system that was also adopted from China".

== Gallery ==
Many cultural items are part of Sino-Japanese heritage: here are a few examples:

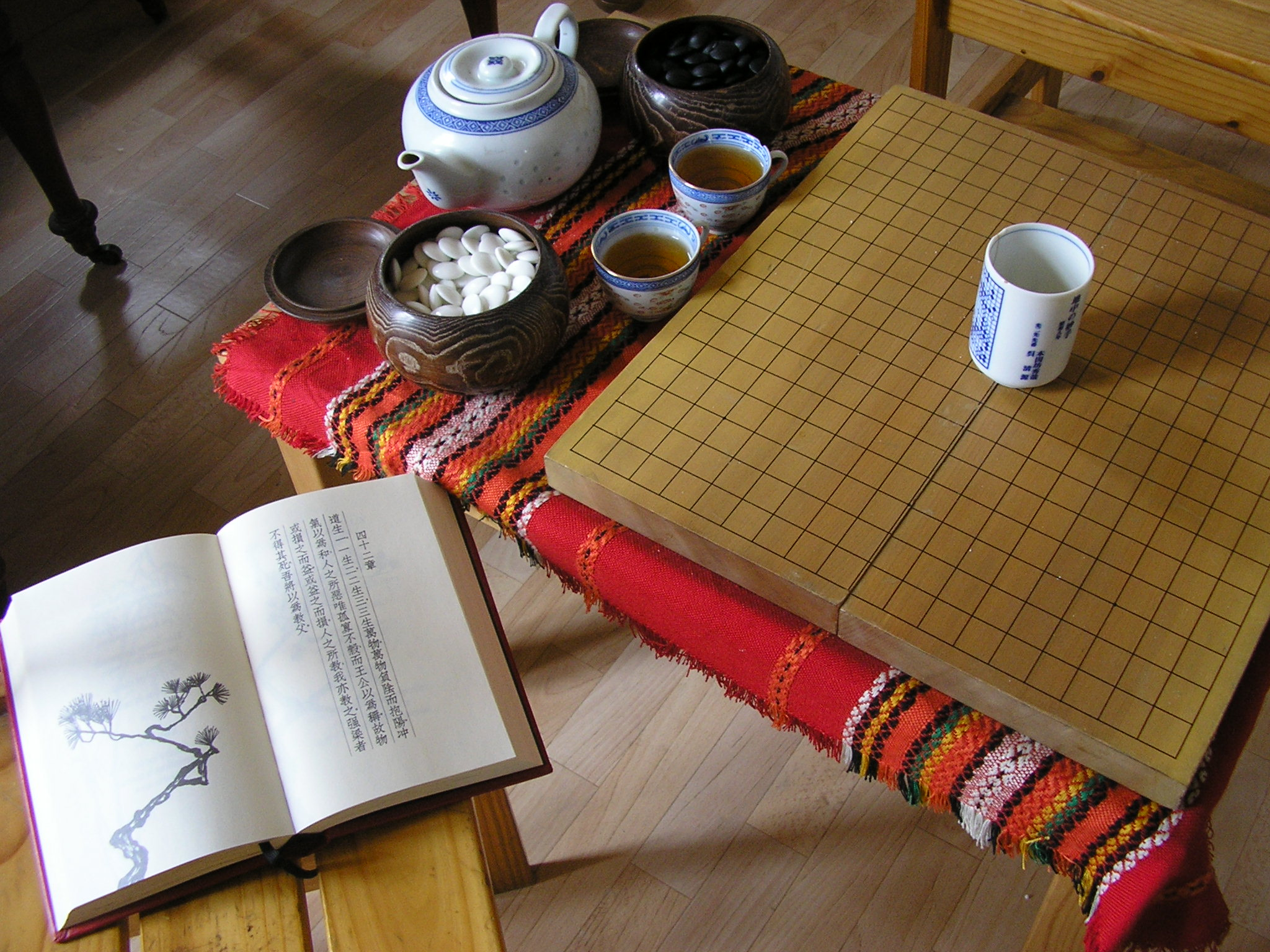
Kanji writing, porcelain, tea and the game of Go

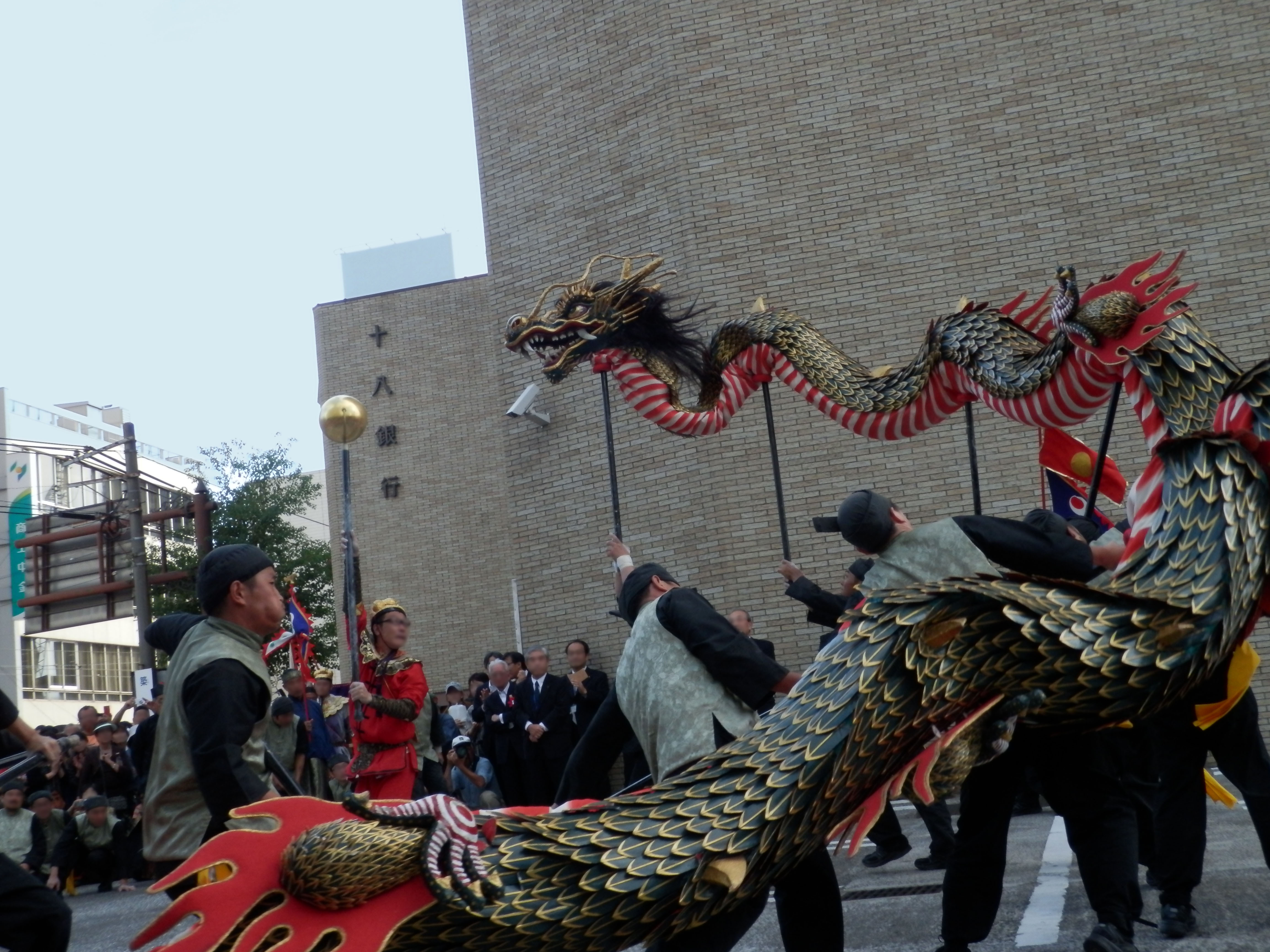
Nagasaki kunchi in Nagasaki, inspired by dragon dance

== See also ==
- Chinese influence on Korean culture
- Japanese influence on Korean culture
- Korean influence on Japanese culture
