= Chinese influence on Korean culture =

Influence of Chinese culture on Korean culture

Chinese influence on Korean culture can be traced back as early as the Goguryeo period; these influences can be demonstrated in the Goguryeo tomb mural paintings. Throughout its history, Korea has been greatly influenced by Chinese culture, borrowing the written language, arts, religions, philosophy and models of government administration from China, and, in the process, transforming these borrowed traditions into distinctly Korean forms.

== History ==
Chinese culture influences can be traced back to the Samhan and Three Kingdoms period. Areas controlled by the Chinese, such as the Lelang Commandery, was a channel for the introduction and spreading of advanced technology and new culture which also influenced the political and the economical development of the Korean peninsula greatly. For example, tomb painting concepts which were found in Goguryeo and the brick paintings found in late Baekje tombs already showed Chinese influences.

=== Goguryeo ===
The Goguryeo tomb murals were primarily painted in two geographical regions: Ji'an (集安) and Pyeongyang.The former is the second capital of Goguryeo while the latter is the third capital of Goguryeo from the mid-fourth to the mid-seventh centuries. While the mural paintings found in regions Ji'an typically shows the characteristics of Goguryeo people in terms of their customs and morals; those from the regions of Pyeongyang typically show the cultural influences of the Han dynasty as the Han dynasty had governed this geographical region for approximately 400 years, including Chinese-style clothing. Goguryeo accepted Sutras and Buddhist pictures from China early on, such as in 372 AD during the Former Qin dynasty period, when they were brought by the envoys of the Heavenly King, Fu Jian.

=== Baekje ===
The Kingdom of Baekje had had early contacts with China and had an especially close relationship with the Southern dynasties of China; It also had frequent cultural exchanges with the Southern dynasties and with the Liang dynasty and would request copies of the Chinese classics, as well as request the dispatch of artisans, painters, and people who were experts in poetry. In 450 AD, during the reign of Yuanjia in the Liu Song dynasty, the King of Baekje requested for the Book of Yi Lin and the Shizhan (式占), as well as waist crossbows, which were all granted by the Emperor. From 534 to 541 AD, it was a frequent occurrence for Emperor Wu of Liang to send Chinese classics to the King of Baekje; he would also send scholars of poetry and rites to Baekje in order to teach the Shijing and the Liji, and he would also frequently send experts and professionals in diverse fields, such as medicine, engineering, etc., in order to distribute these imported skills and knowledge to Baekje. A ruler of Baekje had also requested Emperor Wu of Liang for Buddhist sutras, medical practitioners and painters in 541 AD. The ruling class of Baekje and enjoyed reading the Chinese classics and histories and were proficient in reading Chinese. They also appointed official educators who were well-verse in the Chinese Five Classics, medicine, and astronomy.

=== Silla ===
The Silla Kingdom was sinicized more slowly compared to both Baekje and Goguryeo. However, it studied Chinese Buddhism which was already introduced in the Three Kingdom periods deeply.

Cizang (慈藏), a Silla monk, studied Vinaya in China and when he returned to Silla, he promoted Dharma in 643. Cizang also contributed to the change of Silla's imperial or official dress for the customs of the Tang, which also marked the beginning of Chinese clothing rituals in Silla. During the reign of Queen Jindeok, Kim Chunchu adopted the Tang dynasty dress and encouraged the Silla kingdom to adopt Chinese administrative practices. The danryeong was thus introduced from the Tang dynasty by Kim Chunchu in the second year of Queen Jingdeok's rule.

By the mid-7th century, the ruling class of the Silla Kingdom attached great importance to Chinese culture having inherited this tradition from the previous dynasties. They decided to send envoys to the Tang dynasty to buy Chinese books and acquire Chinese essays; they also sent their people to the Tang dynasty to learn the Tang dynasty culture and to further study Chinese Buddhism and/or to further practice the Chinese ritual systems. The Silla court also sent envoys to the Tang dynasty to request poetry and essays in 686 AD. In the late 7th century during the Unified Silla period, most of the Buddhist sects of the Sui and Tang dynasties had been imported to Korea.

In 837 AD alone, there were 217 students from Silla studying in the schools of the Tang dynasty. By having Silla people studying in the Tang dynasty, they intended to import the Tang dynasty systems related to education, rites, and policy. And thus, these students imported many Chinese books upon their return to Silla and implemented Chinese ideology, legislation and education system in Silla.

The elites of the late Silla became deeply sinicized; the courtiers of Silla wore Chinese dress; the aristocrats wrote in Chinese and also followed Chinese fashions in food and drink culture, as well as music; they also imported all kind of luxurious items which were necessary for their dressing as they were high-born in status.Towards the end of later Silla period, it was Chan Buddhism which became popular and played a key role in developing the regional culture; this period also marked the deepening of the understanding of Confucianism.

It is unknown how far cultural influences from the Chinese had impacted the society, but it is likely that the interest in Chinese culture was largely exclusive to the elites of Silla.

=== Goryeo ===
Goryeo started to imitate imperial examination system of China in the early Song dynasty.

== Dancheong ==
The Korean dancheong was imported from China, known as caihua, along with Buddhism before being developed and modified to have its own distinctive Korean characteristics. The first Korean dancheong was found on a mural in an ancient tomb built in 357 AD during Goguryeo. Dancheong can be traced back to the late Warring State period (c. 3rd century BC) in China. It is not clear when in history the Korean dancheong first started. Although dancheong can be traced back to China, it has become a distinctive characteristic of the Korean tradition and has a long tradition in Korea.

== Architecture and urban planning ==
Korean wooden-frame architecture was introduced from China during the Han dynasty and has continued to the modern era. Other Chinese concepts to influence Korean architecture include yin and yang, the five elements, Chinese geomancy, Taoism and Confucianism.

Chinese cultural influence around the turn of the common era formed the basis for the early Korean architecture in the Three Kingdoms period. This influence is attributed to Lelang Commandery, a Chinese colony in what is now northwestern Korea, which was founded in 109 BCE.{ Baekje in particular adopted heavy Sinitic influence.{

The broad avenues planned in grid pattern found in the capital of Kyongju was built in an imitation of the capital city of Changan of the Tang dynasty.

Chusimp'o (a type of column-head bracketing) is a Korean adaptation of Tang dynasty architecture while the tap'o (a more elaborate system of bracketing) were introduced in Korea from the Tang and Song dynasty respectively.

Later, during the Koryŏ period, further artistic and architectural influences from Song and Liao were absorbed in the peninsula. The wooden building style of this period also seems to have been influenced by that of Fujian in southern China.

=== Free-standing kitchens ===
Free-standing kitchens and kitchen culture of Korea were introduced from China and appear as early as the Goguryeo period.

== Food and drink culture ==
=== Food ingredients ===
Some ingredients which originated from ancient China were also introduced in Korea, including: rice, soybeans were introduced during the Qin dynasty from Northern China, soy sauce.

=== Tea culture ===
Chinese culture has influenced the tea culture in Korea in terms of materials, spiritual and aesthetic forms. In the end of the 8th century, Buddhist monks who had gone to study in the Tang dynasty returned to Silla kingdom with Chan Buddhism, as well as tea culture, as tea played a significant role in the practice of meditation. Green tea was the first type of tea which was introduced in Korea during the reign of Queen Seondok of Silla.

== Fashion and textiles ==
Chinese influences can also be found in the clothing style, accessories, and headgear worn in Korea through the import of clothing or through the adoption of certain Chinese culture elements. These influences can be traced back to Goguryeo, which was founded in 37 BC, and can be observed in the tomb murals of Goguryeo. The Goguryeo tomb murals from the regions of Pyeongyang typically show the cultural influences of the Han dynasty, including painting figures who are dressed in Hanfu-style, as the Han dynasty had governed this geographical region for approximately 400 years. Hanfu-style clothing can also be found in the Goguryeo Gamsinchong tomb dating in the early 5th century, which includes the two maids who dressed in attire which looks similar to the style worn in the Wei, Jin, and Northern and Southern dynasties, Sui, and Tang dynasties.

=== Imported clothing attire system, garment items, and headwear, and its derivatives ===
==== Clothing attire system and single garments ====
Comparison table
Sources of influences or equivalent			Receptor of Chinese influences	
Name	Description	Images	Names	Images
Jiaoling youren pao	Chinese-style po (paofu) was introduced in Korea since the Han dynasty. The ancient durumagi originated from long coat worn by the northern Chinese to fend off cold weather.		Ancient durumagi	
Zhiduo			Buddhist jangsam	
Diyi	Jeokdui (diyi) was bestowed to the Joseon queen along with jeokgwan (diguan 翟冠), baeja, hapi (xiapei), pyeseul.		Jeokdui	
Mianfu			Myeonbok	
Shenyi			Simui	
Lanshan			Namsan	
Lanshan			Aengsam	
Daopao/ zhiduo			Dopo	
Yuanlingpao	The danryeong was imported from the Tang dynasty by Kim Chunchu in the second year of Queen Jingdeok's rule and was worn an official outfit for the government until the end of the Joseon dynasty.		Dallyeongpo	
			Wonsam	
Gunlongpao			Goryeongpo	
Banbi			Banbi	
			Jangui (장의/長衣)	
Daxiushan			Daesam/ daehong daesam	
			Husu (후수/後綬)	
			Chipogwan (치포관/緇布冠)	
			Chungjeonggwan (충정관/沖正冠)	
Futou	Futou was imported since the Tang dynasty		Bokdu	
			Gong jeongchaek (공정책 空頂幘)	
			Jeongjawan	
Zaju chuishao fu				

==== Chinese influences on certain elements in hanbok ====
Chinese version		Influences on Korean clothing		Description
Names	Images	Names	Images	Description
Qixiong ruqun		Chima		The chima was influenced or likely derived from the Tang dynasty Qixiong ruqun; the high-waist skirt was introduced in Silla and Balhae
Jiaoling youren		Jeogori		the change of direction in jeogori closure (i.e. from left to right) is a Chinese influence through the imitation Chinese jackets.
		Unlined jeonbok		Unlined jeonbok was influenced by a Chinese coat.

==== Garments believed to have been derived from Chinese clothing ====
- Dangui.
- Neoul (originated from Mong-su in Goryeo, which is itself believed to have originated from the Tang dynasty)

Garments believed to have been derived from Chinese clothing

- Changbaeja: believed to be a Ming dynasty clothing influence,
- Hwarot

== Paintings ==
=== Buddhist paintings ===
The buddhist paintings of Goryeo were heavily influenced by the drawing techniques of the Song dynasty. In the buddhist paintings of Goryeo, the secular and mythical figures were depicted in the form of worshippers or patrons who were in an audience for the sermons of Buddha, who were witnessed of the heavenly realm or who were ritual participants. These figures were possibly the donors of the paintings and were mostly part of the royalty and aristocratic class who are depicted wearing Chinese clothing; their clothing and headgear typically follow the official dress code of the Song dynasty. The Goryeo painting Water-Moon Avalokiteshvara, for example, show the Chinese and Central Asian pictorial influences; however, the textual and pictorial sources used as prototypes for the iconography are primarily Chinese. The clothing worn in the Yuan dynasty however rarely appears in the Buddhist paintings of Goryeo.

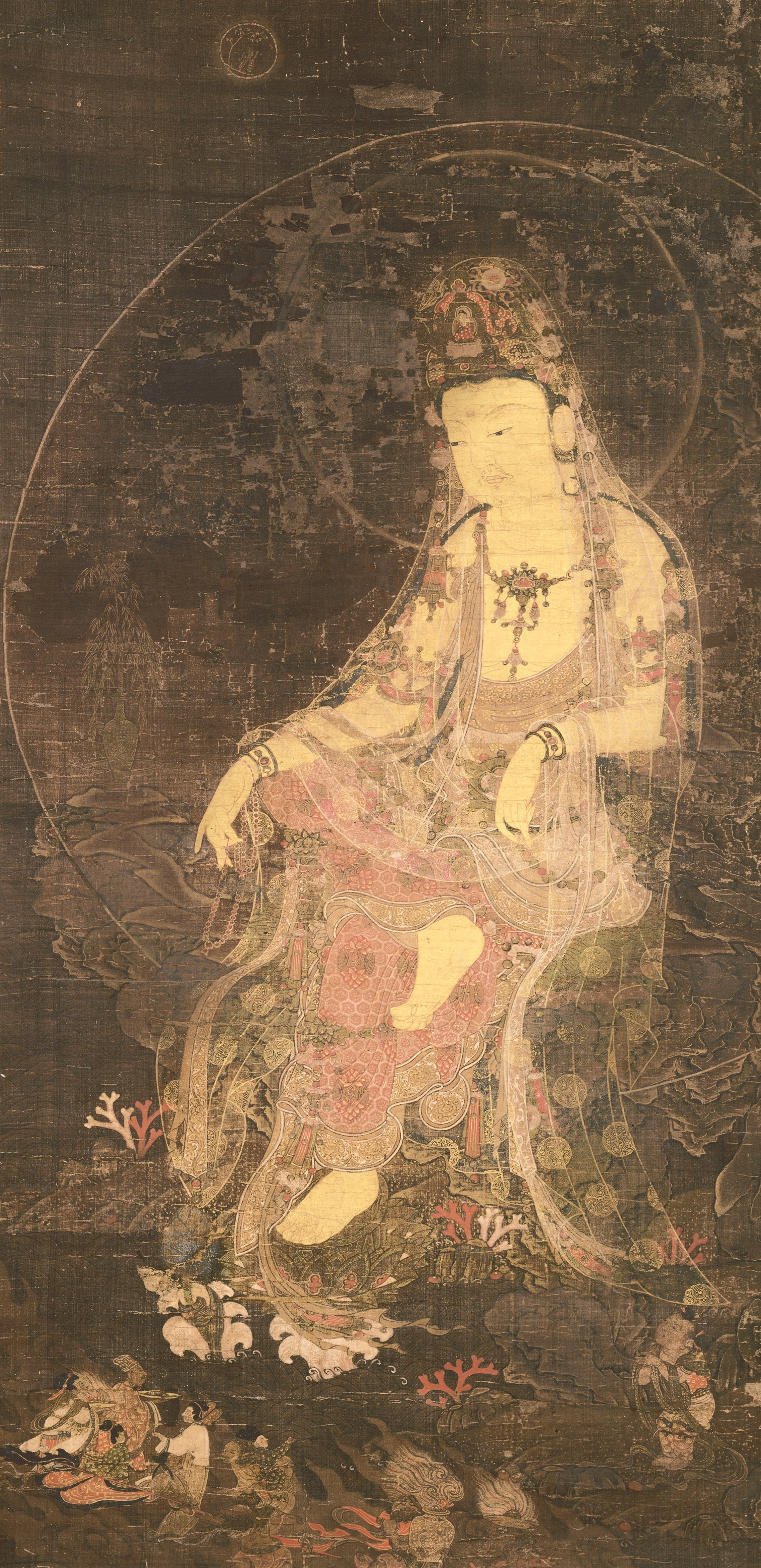
The Water-Moon Avalokiteshvara painting, Goryeo

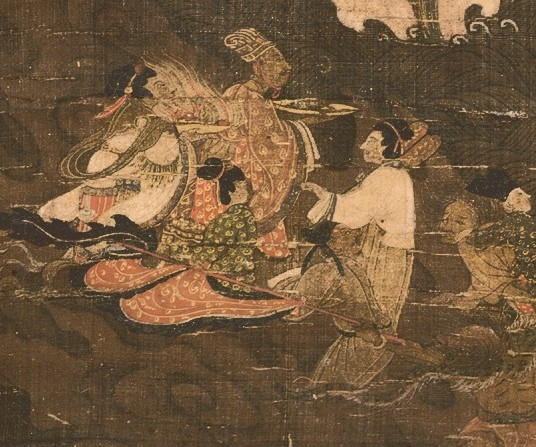
Details of the Water-Moon Avalokiteshvara painting shows a group of nobles (possibly the donors) dress in court clothing, Goryeo.

=== Landscape paintings ===
In Goryeo, landscape paintings started to develop through the cultural influence continuum of the Song dynasty, Yuan dynasty, and early Ming dynasty. Early Goryeo landscape painting were strongly influenced by the Northern Song (960 – 1127 AD) Chinese landscape painting. In the later 11th century and in the early 12th century, many Northern Song landscape paintings were introduced in Goryeo. By the first half of the 12th century, Goryeo painters also started to paint landscape paintings scenes which depict actual places in Korea. However, it is unlikely that those Goryeo landscape paintings had any direct relationship on the development of true-view landscape painting which was developed in Joseon as the true-view landscape painting of Joseon was stylistically based on the Southern School of Chinese painting.

==== True-view landscape paintings ====
The first true-view landscape painting was created by Chinese painters and appeared in the world art history during the Song dynasty in the 10th century showing the pastoral scenes in Southern China. True-view landscape painting depicting South China scenery then spread to Korea, Vietnam, and Japan. In Korea, true-view landscape paintings was first introduced by diplomatic envoys during the Goryeo in the 13th century and the imported original Chinese paintings were then copied. It is only in the 18th century Joseon that jingyeong sansu (i.e. 'true-view landscape painting') were developed and when Korean painters started to paint their native Korean pastoral scenes instead of copying the South China landscapes which they have never seen.

== Sculpture and Ceramics ==
=== Pottery ===
Korea's pottery culture has been influence by China as early as 2000 B.C.

=== Goryeo Celadon ===
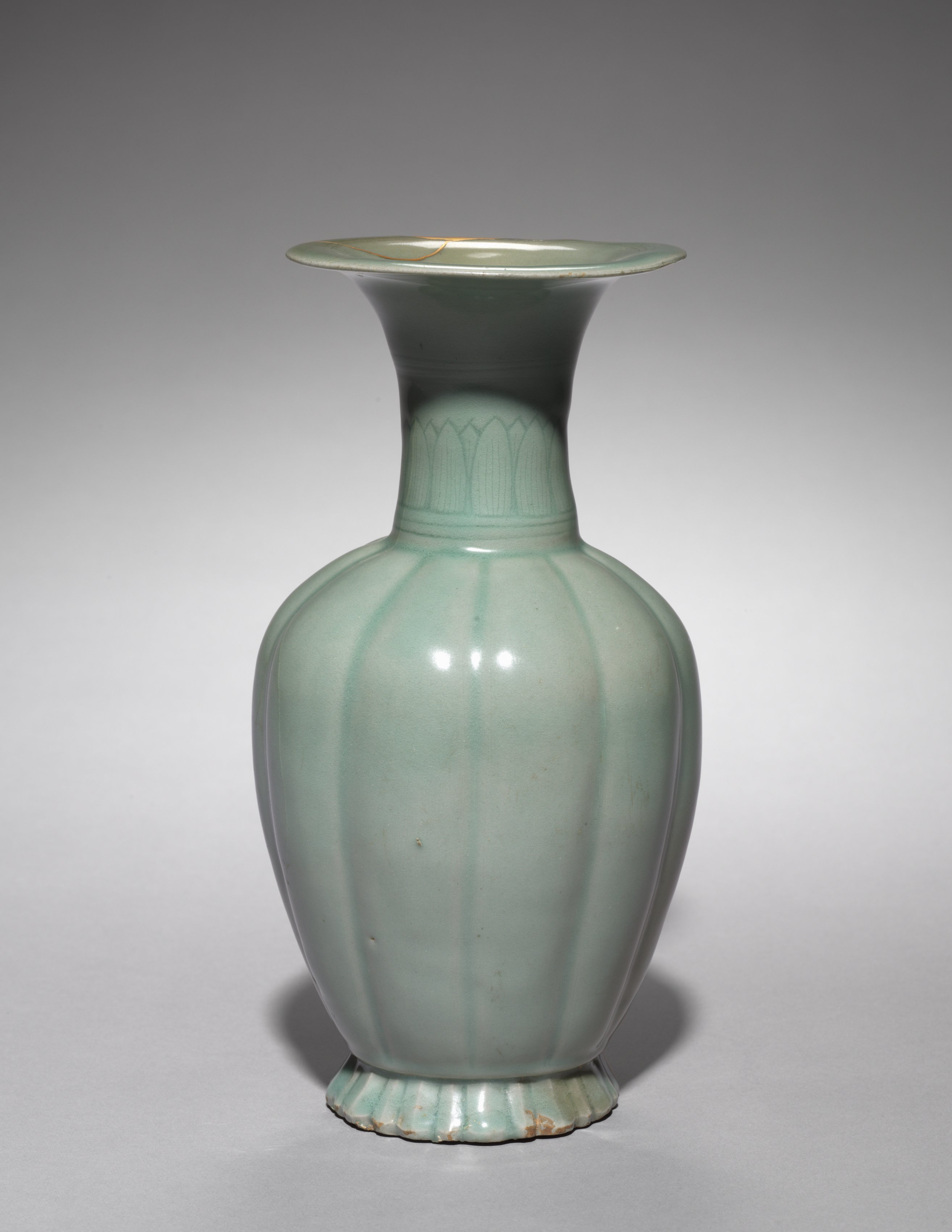
Vase in the form of a melon, Goryeo celadon, d. 1100. This vase shows the stylistic influence of the Qingbai ware.

Some early Goryeo potters were themselves Chinese. Chinese potters who left their homeland due to political upheaval brought new ceramic technologies and styles to the local Goryeo potters who then managed to make their own Goryeo-style celadon. Goryeo celadon was one of the main types of ceramics produced in Korea during the Goryeo period; it first appeared in Goryeo between the 9th and 10 centuries. The Goryeo celadon was influenced by the ceramic-making skills in Zhejiang Province, China. The celadons manufactured in Zhejiang province were known for their best quality since the Tang dynasty. The celadon glaze technology and the kiln structure (i.e. various Chinese kilns were prototypes for Goryeo potters) technology was also adapted from China. The Goryeo potters also learnt their technical expertise from the Song dynasty celadon traditions and imitated certain styles from Chinese wares which included the shapes of bottles, bowls and standard decorative motives (e.g. lotus, peonies, flying parrots, and scenes of waterfowl by the pond). Goryeo celadons were influenced by Chinese wares and kilns:

- Yue ware and kilns located in present-day Zhejiang province: decoration motifs on Goryeo celadons were inspired by the decorations found on Yue ware. Long-neck bottles (which were later elongated by Goryeo potters and given more bulging body) have originated from Chinese Yue kiln.
- Qingbai ware from the Northern Song period from the late 1000s: New shapes of bowls, dishes, cups, vases, bottles were produced under the diplomatic relations between Goryeo and the Northern Song dynasty; the shapes and decorations were then adjusted to reflect the aesthetics taste of Goryeo but some Goryeo celadon shows the influence of the qingbai ware (bluish-white porcelain) which is produced by the Chinese Jingdezhen kilns.
- Maebyeong (prunus vase; meiping in Chinese): The Goryeo maebyeong shows the integration of Chinese elements by Goryeo potters; the shape of the prunus vase was influenced by the Chinese wares produced by the Ru, Ding, Jingdezhen, Yaozhou, and Cizhou kilns which existed during the Northern Song dynasty.
- Jingdezhen ware: Having become part of the Yuan dynasty, the goryeo celadon vases adopted the style of the blue-white porcelains which were produced by the Chinese Jingdezhen kilns.

== Music and dance ==
=== Musical instruments ===
While a vast majority of Korean musical instruments clearly have some Sinitic ancestry, most of these imported instruments have never been widely used in Korean music, and many are now obsolete. The qin (Korean kŭm), for instance, is almost never played outside of the semi-annual Sacrifice to Confucius (Korean sŏkchŏn). The comparatively popular kayagŭm and kŏmun'go, although they are reputed to have originated in China, have been independent for centuries, and have been modified significantly from the Chinese originals.

=== Music ===
Chinese music was introduced in Korea and was performed at the Korean court during the Tang and Song dynasties. The traditional genre of tangak (literally "music of Tang") was imported from China, probably mostly during the Goryeo period. The aak genre, by contrast, was developed in Korea in the fifteenth century based on Chinese written sources from an earlier period, as the style had already fallen out of fashion in China. Examples of tangak include the Nakyangchun (Chinese: 洛阳春; pinyin: Luòyángchūn) and the Boheoja (Chinese: 步虛子; pinyin: bùxūzi) are two Song dynasty ci poetry which were introduced during the Goryeo period and are still being performed in present days Korea. Despite Korean claims to aak retaining its "pure" Chinese form it bears marks of alteration after being imported to Korea.

== Writing and literature ==
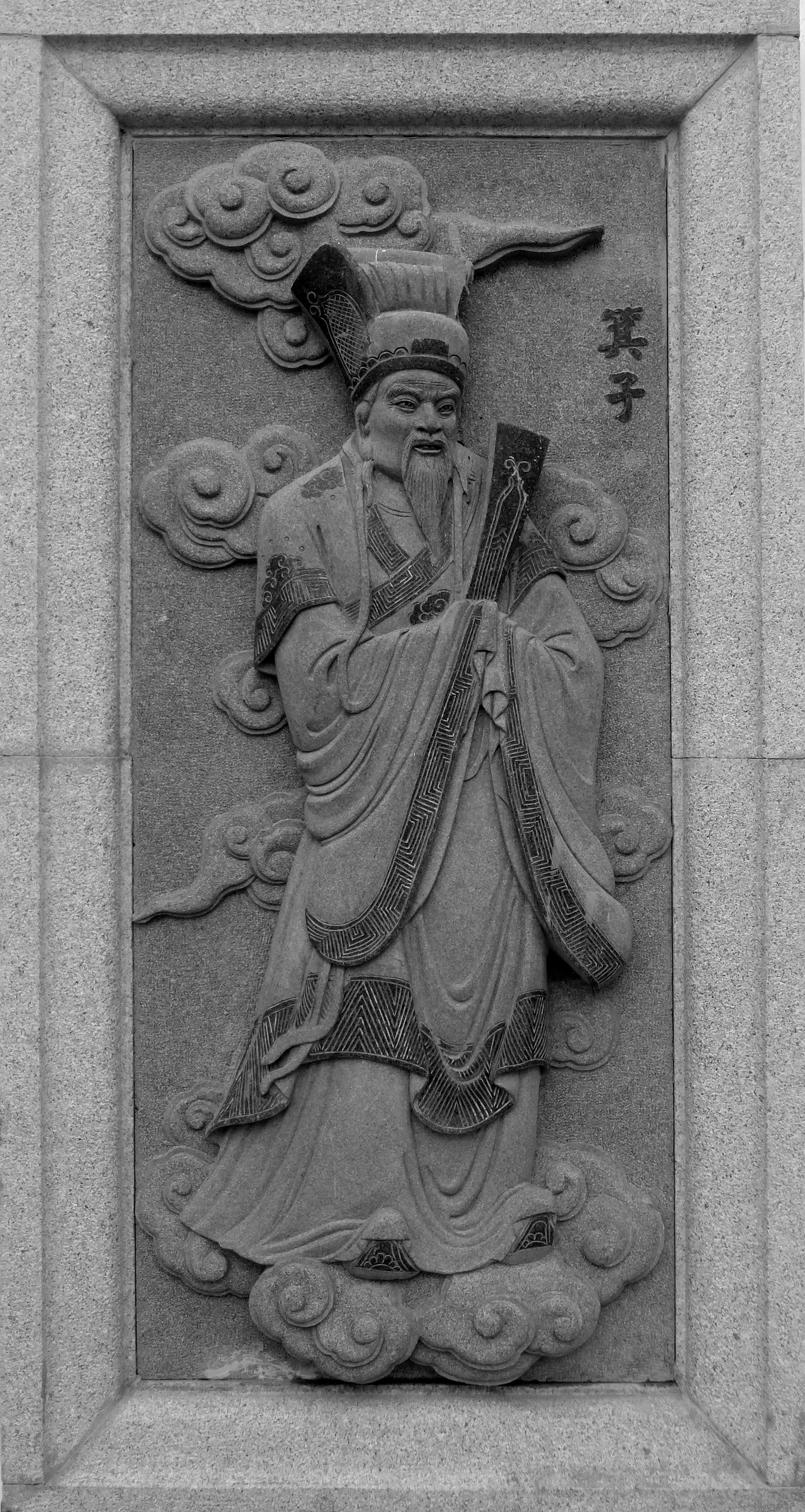
The Chinese scholar Jizi is credited by ancient sources with introducing written language to Korea. However, recent archaeological excavations have confirmed that he never settled in Gojoseon.

The majority of literature produced in the Korean peninsula before the twentieth century was written in Classical Chinese; the reason for this is that the indigenous writing system, hangŭl, only developed relatively late (the fifteenth century) and was not widely accepted as a means of writing intellectual discourse until the late nineteenth century.

Extant Korean poetry in Chinese goes back to the Koguryŏ period. Later, under Unified Silla and Koryŏ, poetic and prose compositions continued to closely follow forms originating in China and characteristic of the Six Dynasties period. The Wen Xuan was extremely influential in China during the Tang dynasty, and the Korean literati of the period followed suit. Tang poetic principles also appear to have influenced poetic composition the peninsula during the Koryŏ period.

Several important poets of the ninth and tenth centuries, including Ch'oe Ch'i-wŏn (born 857) and Ch'oe Sŭng-no (927–989) studied in China.

All scriptural and commentarial writings composed by pre-modern Korean Buddhists were written in literary Chinese (Korean hanmun).

== Scholarship ==
The historian Kim Pusik (1075–1151), a Confucian, adopted the historiographic style of Sima Qian in compiling his Samguk Sagi.

== Religion and philosophy ==
=== Chinese religion and symbolism ===
In the Anak tomb murals of Goguryeo, for example, the crows which were depicted on the roof ridges show the influence of Chinese culture. The crow was a symbolism of the Sun God in ancient China and was an emblem of the dynastic rulers. This tradition was later adopted by the people of Baekje.

=== Buddhism ===
To ignore the greater northeast Asian context in discussing Korean Buddhism is to distort Korean Buddhism. Buddhism was introduced to Korea in the fourth century, during the Three Kingdoms period. The Samguk sagi records that Buddhism was first introduced to Koguryŏ around 372 by the monk Sundo/Shundao, who was summoned to the Chinese state of Former Qin by its king Fujian, and that the Indian monk Mālānanda brought Buddhism from the Eastern Jin to Paekche around 384.

All schools of Korean Buddhism have their roots in earlier Chinese innovations, in both doctrine and soteriology. While Korean monks training in China often played a critical part in some of these developments, (Note: Buswell (2010 : 44–46) emphasizes the mutual interchange of influence between Chinese Buddhism and the traditions of other "peripheral" regions such as Korea, Japan, Vietnam and Tibet.) China's size and its geographical position on the Silk Road (which gave it stronger ties to the older Buddhist traditions of India and Central Asia) allowed it to pioneer the majority of trends in East Asian Buddhism.

The monk Wŏnch'ŭk studied in China under Xuanzang and developed his interpretation of Yogācāra Buddhism derived from Xuanzang's New Yogācāra. Sŏn Buddhism, a Korean form of Chan Buddhism, began with the seventh century Silla monk Pŏmnang, who studied in China with the Fourth Patriarch of Chan Buddhism, Daoxin. Sŏn monks followed Pŏmnang's example studying this new form of Buddhism in China for the next century and a half, and most of the founders of Nine Mountains school of Sŏn traced their lineage to Mazu Daoyi of the Hongzu sect. Two other examples of Korean sects with Chinese roots were Ch'ŏnt'ae, founded by Ŭich'ŏn based on the Chinese Tiantai, and Hwaŏm (Ch. Huayan. Though Ŭich'ŏn only established Ch'ŏnt'ae as a separate school of Korean Buddhism in the eleventh century, Korean Buddhists had been studying Chinese Tiantai as early as the seventh century.

The eleventh-century Korean Tripiṭaka that would later become a reference point for the twentieth-century Japanese Taishō Tripiṭaka were based on the Chinese Buddhist Tripiṭaka completed in the tenth century.

== Law and government ==
Pre-modern Korea's dynastic governmental systems were significantly indebted to China.

Starting in the Three Kingdoms period, Korean government officials were trained with a Chinese-style Confucian examination system. This examination system continued into the Chosŏn period, but unlike in China the examination was only open to members of the aristocratic upper class.

The national flag of South Korea is derived from the Chinese philosophy yin-yang and the Chinese divination text I Ching.

== Names ==
Korean surnames use Chinese characters. Typically, Korean names use one character for the family name and two for the given name, in close resemblance to Chinese names.

== New Year ==
The annual Korean Seollal is a unique Korean tradition, influenced by China, that is based on the lunar cycle. It is closely associated with the 12-year cycle of the Chinese zodiac that follows in the order of rat, ox, tiger, rabbit, dragon, snake, horse, sheep, monkey, rooster, dog, and then pig. Such a fixed order of animals comes from an old Chinese folklore about the sequence of animals that were invited to bid farewell to the dying Buddha.

== See also ==
- Japanese influence on Korean culture
- Chinese influence on Japanese culture
- Korean influence on Japanese culture

== Cited works ==
- Buswell, Jr., Robert E. (2010). "Thinking about "Korean Buddhism": A Continental Perspective". Journal of Korean Religions. 1 (1–2 Taylor Gilbert). Seoul: Institute for the Study of Religion [Sogang University]: 43–55. doi:10.1353/jkr.2010.0012. JSTOR 23943285. S2CID 143561986.
- Keown, Damien; Prebish, Charles S., eds. (2010). Encyclopedia of Buddhism. New York: Routledge. ISBN 978-0-203-49875-0.
- Mair, Victor H., ed. (2001). The Columbia History of Chinese Literature. New York: Columbia University Press. ISBN 0-231-10984-9. (Amazon Kindle edition.)
- Provine, Robert C. (1987). "The Nature and Extent of Surviving Chinese Musical Influence on Korea". The World of Music. 29 (2). Berlin: VWB – Verlag für Wissenschaft und Bildung: 5–18. JSTOR 43562732.
