= Japanese influence on Korean culture =

Japan has left an influence on Korean culture. Many influences came from the Japanese occupation and annexation of Korea in the 20th century, from 1910 to 1945. During the occupation, the Japanese sought to assimilate Koreans into the Japanese empire by changing laws, policies, religious teachings, and education to influence the Korean population. In addition, Korean nationalism continued to rise after the Japanese colonial rule ended and played a large part in the rapid economic development of South Korea.

Since the late 20th century, Japanese influence has mainly involved popular culture. In 1998, Kim Dae-Jung, the then president of South Korea, visited Japan and gradually lifted a cultural ban that had been imposed on Japan. South Korea and Japan have reached a consensus to open up a policy of accepting the culture of the other. Since then, Japanese popular culture has become more popular among young people in Korea, with a noticeable boom in recent years.

== Physical culture ==
=== Sports ===
Baseball, which was initially introduced to a significant extent by Americans, became a major part of Korean culture during Japanese rule, as the game became a conduit for Korean nationalism and a way to participate in Western modernity.

=== Martial arts ===
The Korean martial art known as Hapkido derives from Japanese Aikido, which in turn is a modernized version of Japanese Daitō-ryū Aiki-jūjutsu, whose teachings were compiled by Shinra Saburo Minamoto Yoshimitsu during the 11th century.

The Korean martial art of Kumdo derives from Japanese Kendo. In 1896, the Dai Nippon Butoku Kai expanded to Korea as the Dai Nippon Butokukai - Choson-bu (Korean Branch), and Kendo was made a compulsory subject in Korean schools in 1939, eventually diverging into Kumdo after the Second World War.

It is believed that taekwondo's closest ancestors were Shotokan karate. Today's taekwondo is based on karate and has developed to fuse taekkyeon and other traditional martial arts.

== Educational culture ==
=== Changes in the Korean official language ===
During the Japanese colonial period, the Japanese government forced Korean students to study in Japanese for more than 35 years by forcing them to use textbooks written in Japanese. Almost all of technical and scientific terms in the Korean language have been borrowed or taken directly from Japanese coined-terms based on Chinese characters (which in Japan are called Kanji).

The 1939 revision of the Korean Civil Ordinance allowed Koreans to adopt Japanese-style surnames. There is controversy over whether or not the adoption of a Japanese surname was effectively mandatory, or merely strongly encouraged.

== Cultural belief ==
In August 1915, the Regulations on the Propagation of Religion were issued. They indicate that the three major religions recognized in Korea at the time were Buddhism, Shinto and Christianity. The regulations made that religious activities must comply with the government-general, and that religious leaders must follow government decisions regarding expression of religion.

=== Buddhism under Japanese occupation ===
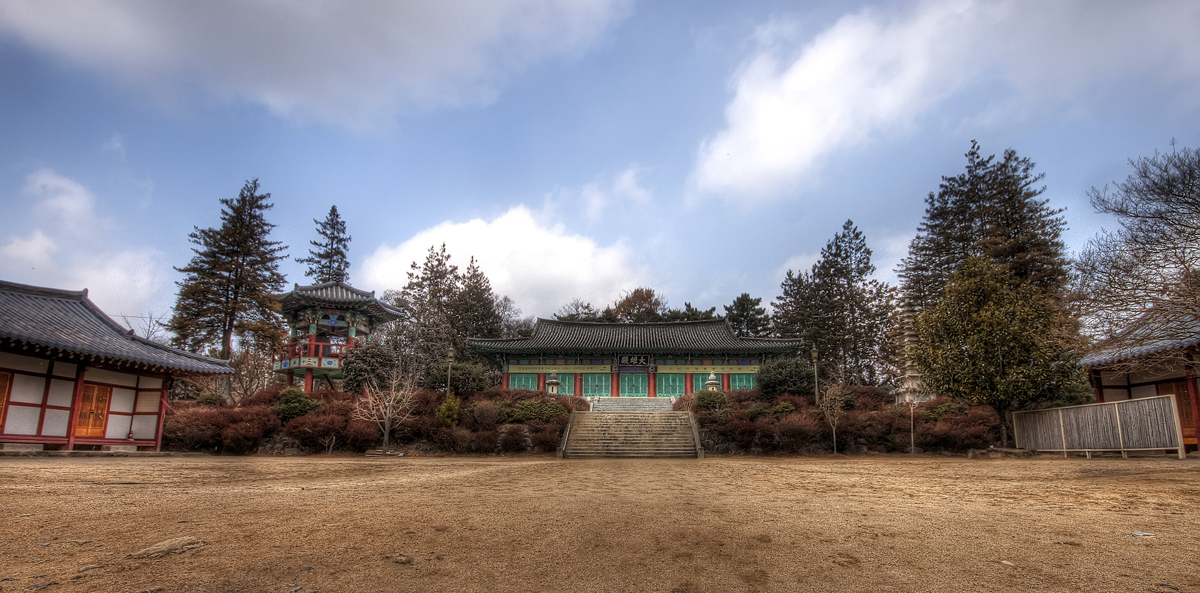
Buddhist Korean Temple

In 1910, Japan occupied Korea, and to cope with the growth of Japanese missionaries, Korea proposed an auxiliary relationship and used Korean temples as branches of the Japanese denomination.

In June 1911, the government tried to centralize the control of Korean Buddhism by establishing themselves in the temple administration and proposed the Temple Ordinance, which cut off the contact between Korean clergy and Japanese clergy by institutionalizing and bureaucratizing Korean Buddhism. According to the Temple Ordinance, the government re-examined each temple and select 30 Korean temples to become representatives of Korean Buddhism, and the Buddhist abbots would have important administrative powers. After that, the relationship of the remaining 1300 temples will be formalized, but the content spread by the temple need to be approved by the government. This regulation has caused the abbots to be obsessed with power and caused a fierce battle for status and causing public grievances.

In 1912, the government proposed temple regulations to the administrators of each temple. Those days associated with modern imperial ideology, such as National Foundation Day (Kigensetsu) and the birthday of Emperor (Tenchosetsu) are inseparable from the temple rituals, Korean Buddhism became Japanization. The Japanese colonists promoted the Japanization of Korean Buddhism to eradicate the inherent religious habits and beliefs of Korea to establish a national and cultural identity with Korea to solve the ruling crisis.

In August 1919, the third governor, Saito Makoto, tried to change the overall structure of the government and put in pro-Japanese elements. Also, recognized that Koreans have human rights. This is called the assimilation policy and it also trains pro-Japanese people among religious people.

In 1926, Korean Buddhist believers under Japanese rule were allowed to legally marry, leading temples to bear additional costs of childcare and reducing adherence to monasticism. Some monks claimed these changes violate the rules of Buddhism. Therefore, although the number of Buddhist believers doubled during the Japanese rule, disputes within the temple arose.

=== Christianity under Japanese occupation ===
After Korea became a Japanese protectorate, Western powers also followed. At this time, in the face of Japanese colonial occupation, Christian community leaders resisted by organizing and establishing religious schools, spreading an ideology of Korean nationalism.

The Japanese promulgated a decree to hinder Korean Christianity. It hoped to weaken anti-Japanese sentiment by controlling public opinion, fully assimilating Koreans, and stipulating Japanese as the official language of Korea. However, Christian churches organized and spread anti-colonial sentiment. After the end of Japanese occupation, Christianity is still highly influential in Korean society.

== Popular culture ==
As a major economic power, Japan has played an influence on Asia for a long time. Especially after the spread of Japanese pop culture in East Asia, Japanese comics, Anime, pop music and TV dramas have become very popular. Japan has found that the commercial value of the pop culture industry is constantly improving, and it can provide a lot of help for the accumulation of capital. Therefore, Japan began to try its best to promote the popular culture industry. Despite the fact that Japan had invaded some of these countries, many people have strongly resisted Japan, and those who have not experienced the cruel aggression of the Middle Ages have no feeling about it. Asian adolescents are defined as one of the most audiences in this industry, and their enthusiasm for new things is not too much of a concern, and they will not delve into the source and history of such consumer goods. Therefore, the Japanese pop culture industry has had a great impact among Asian teenagers.

Since its liberation from Japanese colonial rule in 1945, South Korea has banned Japanese Pop culture and adopted a policy of blocking Japanese popular culture. In 1965, after the establishment of diplomatic relations between South Korea and Japan, the two countries only made frequent economic exchanges, South Korea still banned Japanese culture. After the president of South Korea, Kim Dae-Jung visited Tokyo in 1998, South Korea proposed four steps to gradually lift the ban on Japan. From October 1998 to June 2000, the Japanese culture was implemented in an open policy in three steps. It is expected to complete the fourth ban to accept the spread of Japanese TV programs and popular music, when South Korea and Japan jointly hold the FIFA World Cup in 2002

In 2001, the relationship between South Korea and Japan gradually improved. In the same year, the Japanese ministry of Education passes an application submitted by the Japanese imperialist Association, saying that Japanese textbooks were too self-critical, self-tortured, and degraded for Japanese imperialism. The textbook should be revised to cultivate Japanese national pride. This action angered China and South Korea. Since then, Japan has not changed the textbook anymore. South Korea said they will not implement the last step to lift the ban on Japanese culture in 2002 until the problem is solved.

=== Comic and animation ===
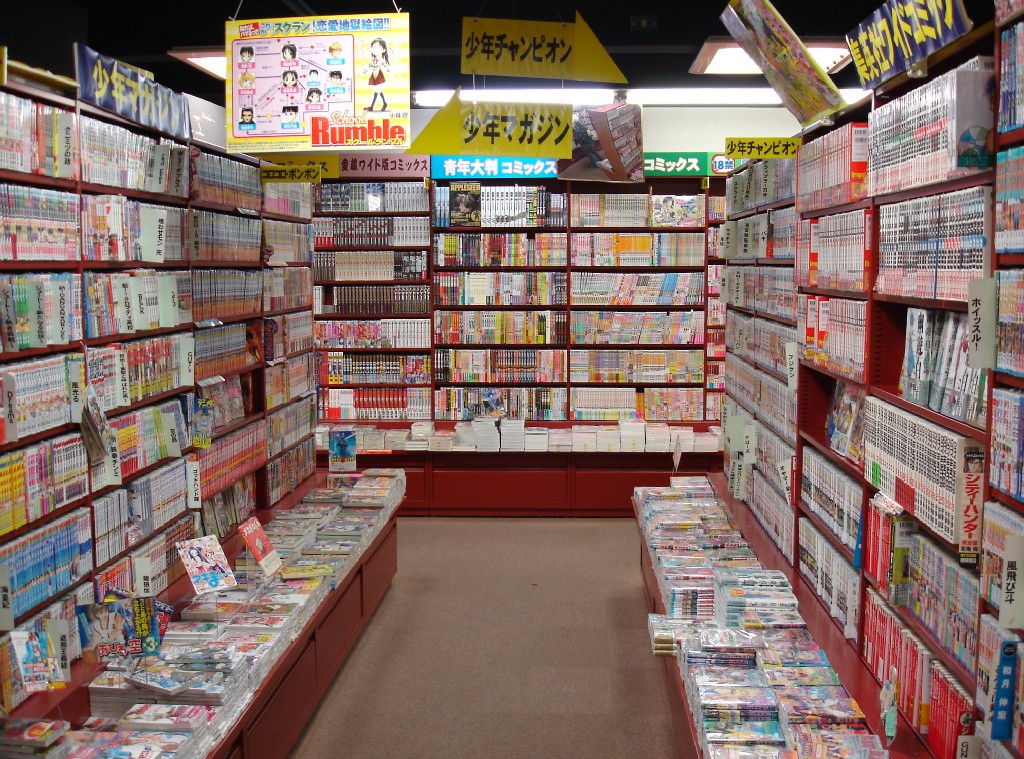
Comic and anime store

In 1998, Korea lifted the ban on Japanese pop culture, and Japanese animation officially legalized in Korea. Japan and Korea achieved a low price on television through the co-production of comics. In the late 1980s, Korea learned the technical know-how of Japanese manga through cooperation, and the level of television animation increased rapidly. By reducing the Japanese flavor of animation and adding Korean local elements, Korean comics have been created and arranged into TV animations. Animation are consumed as a lifestyle, and not only for children and teenager, but also for young people and even older.

=== Movies and TV drama ===
When Korea began to accept Japanese culture gradually, not all Japanese films were allowed to spread in Korea. Only the world's four major international film festivals (Cannes Film Festival, Venice Film Festival, Berlin Film Festival, American Academy Awards) won works or Japan-Korea joint production (more than 20% of Korean funding) can be allowed to spread. In addition, in the case of a Korean director or a Korean protagonist is also required, and only movies recognized as global art can be released in Korea.

In 1999, Japanese film director Shunji Iwai’s movie “Love Letter” was broadcast in South Korea. As the first film released in Korea, it received a great welcome in Korea. The heroine often said, “How are you” which became a popular sentence for Korean youth. Japan has also launched a family TV series to Korea such as The Queen's Classroom. Japan has changed the Korean's views on Japan by beautifying TV dramas. The Koreans have more understanding of daily life and Japanese families and have improved their impression of Japan .

=== Novels ===
Young Koreans ceased to be forced to learn Japanese after their country became independent, Japanese novels are often translated into Korean. In 1970, Yomaoka Sohachi's novel “Tokugawa Ieyasu” was translated into Korean, and sold more than 400,000 copies, becoming an unprecedented bestseller. Gyoho Bunko, a large book store in South Korea, has a corner only for Japanese books and is always thriving. The top ten bestsellers in novels, as published annually by “Gunpo Bunko”, include works by Japanese artists. Many Japanese artists such as Haruki Murakami, Kaori Ekuni, Banana Yoshimoto, Akira Higashino and Hideo Okuda are popular among young Koreans

=== Music ===
Pink Lady participated in the World Song Festival held in Seoul in South Korea in 1980, and were the first Japanese musicians to perform in a concert in Seoul. As of 2024, J-pop has become popular in South Korea. In 2023, imase reached number 17 on the Melon chart, and was the first Japanese musician to enter the top one hundred of that chart. Between 2023 and 2024, the streaming of J-pop in South Korea increased by 40% on Spotify and 93% on Genie Music. A Yoasobi concert in South Korea sold out almost immediately. As of 2024, Showa retro music has become popular in South Korea, including the Showa era music of Akina Nakamori, Seiko Matsuda and others. Showa retro music is included in the television programme Korea-Japan Top Ten Show broadcast by MBN since May 2024. A performance in Tokyo in 2024 of a cover version of Matsuda's "Aoi Sangoshou" (1980) by Korean band NewJeans went viral in South Korea, and pushed the song up the Melon chart.

== Korean response ==
In response, Koreans began to view rejection of and resistance towards Japan and its culture as patriotic. Many Korean nationalists today still harbor anti-Japanese sentiment.

In 2018, Iz*One's song "Suki ni natchau daro?" was banned on KBS and SBS. The song's lyrics are composed in Japanese language, which is believed to be the reason. In Japan, there were suspicions that KBS's actions were racism.

== See also ==
- Korea under Japanese rule
- Chinese influence on Korean culture
- Chinese influence on Japanese culture
- Korean influence on Japanese culture
- Japanese influence on Chinese culture
- Culture of Japan
- Culture of Korea
