= Goryeo Buddhist paintings =

Korean art form

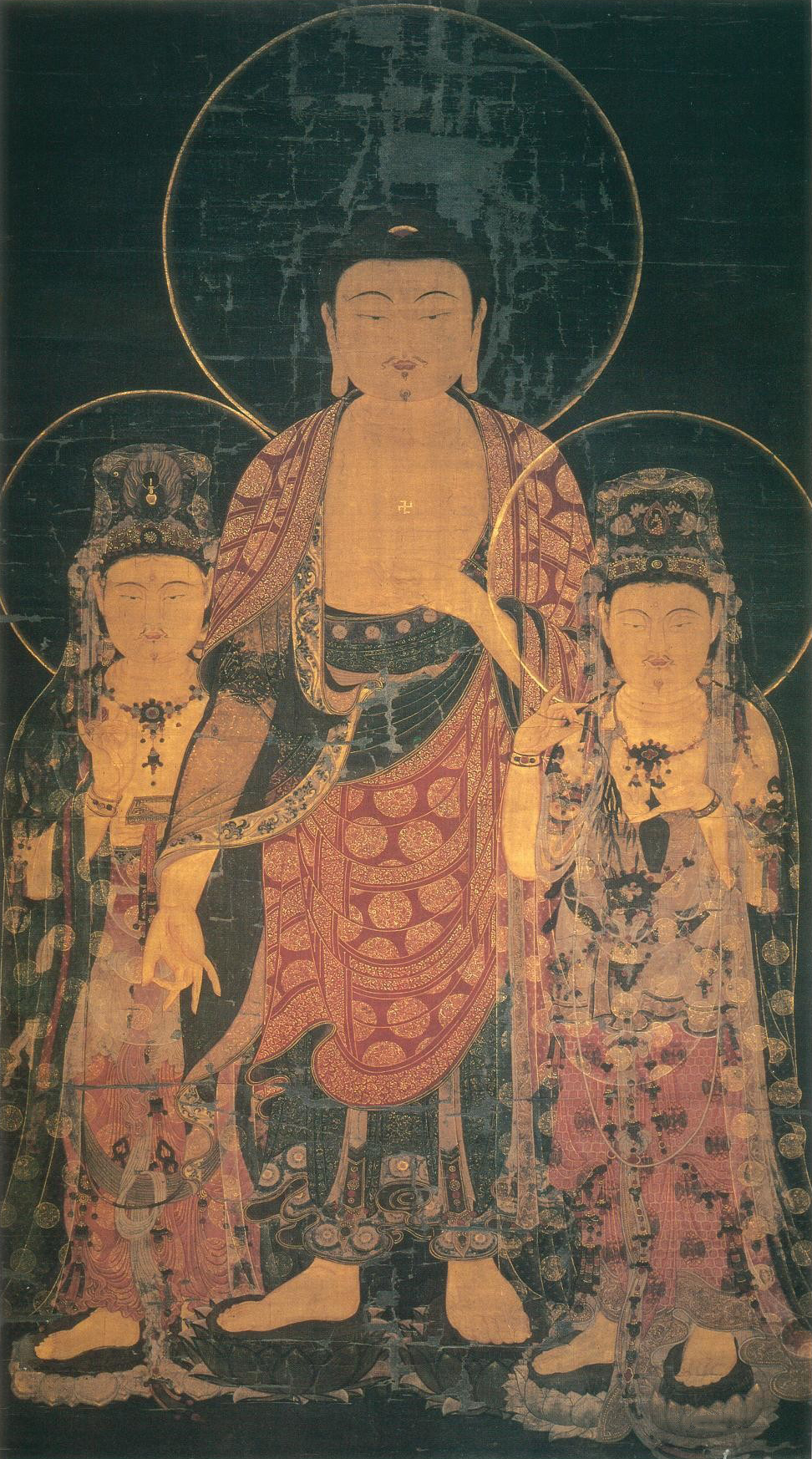
Amitabha Triad (Senjuji Tsu), late Goryeo

Goryeo Buddhist paintings and architecture are prominent Korean art forms that are said to have originated in the 13 and 14th centuries. Known for their intricate depiction of Buddhist icons typically in the form of large hanging scrolls, artists made use of vibrant colors and adorned the patterns with gold. As Buddhism flourished as the official religion of the Goryeo Dynasty, various Buddhist artworks were produced under royal patronage and utilized for the purposes of state-sponsored ceremonies and funerary rituals. These paintings reflect not only the beliefs, but the taste and refine of the Goryeo royalty and nobility. Illustrations and decorative architectural styles often reflected the messages of Pure Land Buddhism or Amidism featuring Buddhas and Bodhisattvas; for instance, Avalokiteśvara, amongst others, were worshipped by their devotees to achieve the goal of rebirth in the ‘Pure Land’ or paradise.

As one of the consequences of years of war, the majority of the paintings are no longer found in Korea. The tradition of Goryeo paintings was forgotten for a very long time and regained significance in the recent decades when scholars started studying the techniques and attributes that are commonly seen in these artworks. Currently, numerous of these paintings are preserved by Japanese collectors, who attained them either through trade or as a result of the Japanese colonial period from 1910-1945. To this day, scholars have been successful in identifying only less than 160 paintings throughout the world.

== Theme ==
At present, 133 Goryeo paintings have been found and preserved worldwide and a large percentage, 110 paintings to be specific, have illustrations of the Sukhāvatī (서방극락정토; Seobang Geungnak Jeongto) which roughly translates to the ‘Western Heaven’. Pure Land Buddhism is a branch of Mahayana Buddhism enjoys immense popularity in East Asian Countries as the most followed tradition. Some of the most renowned painting depicts ‘Amitābha (아미타불; Amitabul) who is believed to be the “Lord of the Western Paradise” either in alone or often accompanied by Bodhisattva Avalokiteśvara and Mahasthamaprapta which are Sanskrit names of Gwanseuum Bosal (관세음보살) and Daeseji Bosal (대세지 보살) respectively. Amitabul was also featured as surrounded by the Eight Great Bodhisattvas. Bodhisattva Ksitigarbha (지장보살; Jijang Bosal) was also worshiped and portrayed in several scroll paintings. These paintings also communicated how one can join them in paradise.

== Materials ==
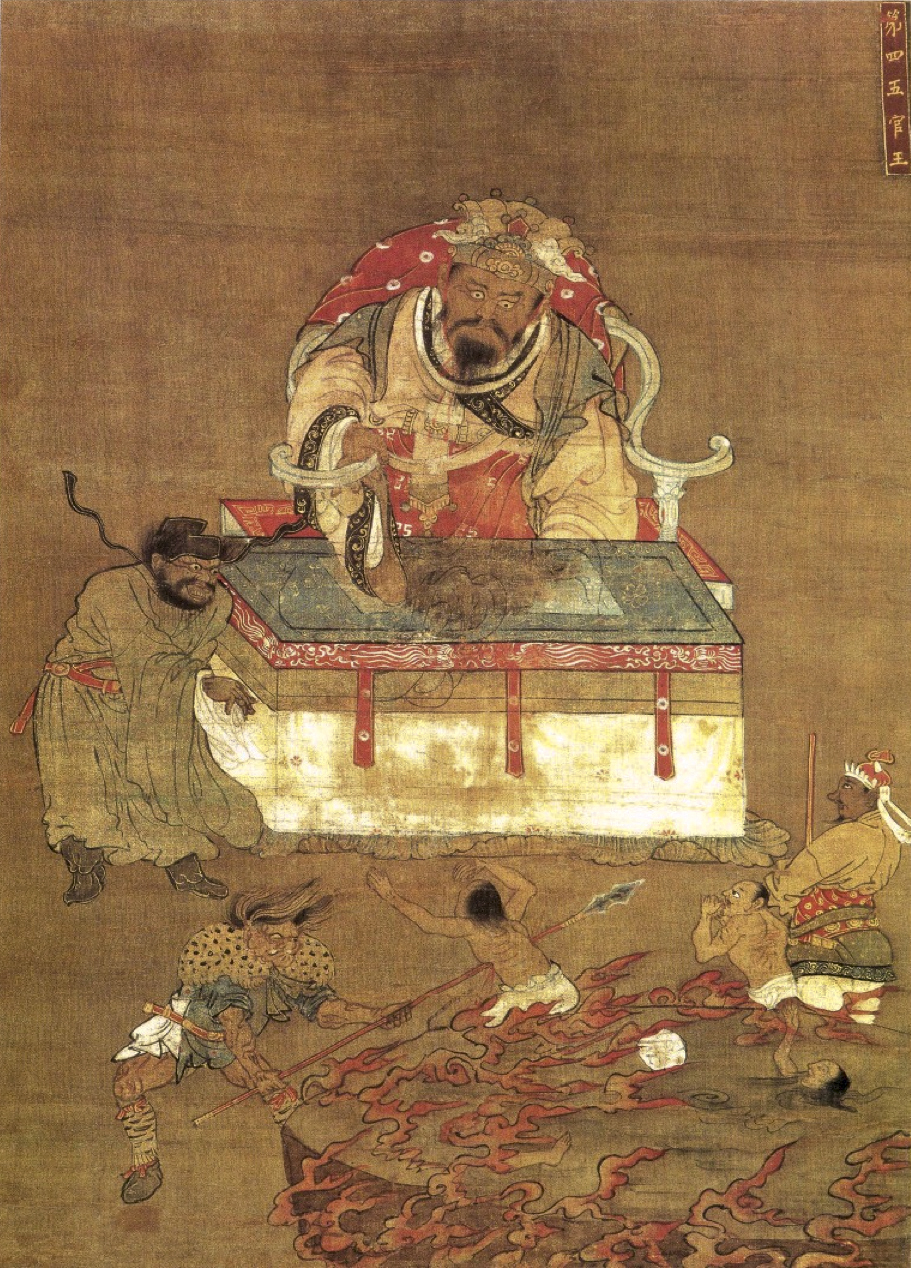
One of a set of the Ten Kings of Hell (No.4)

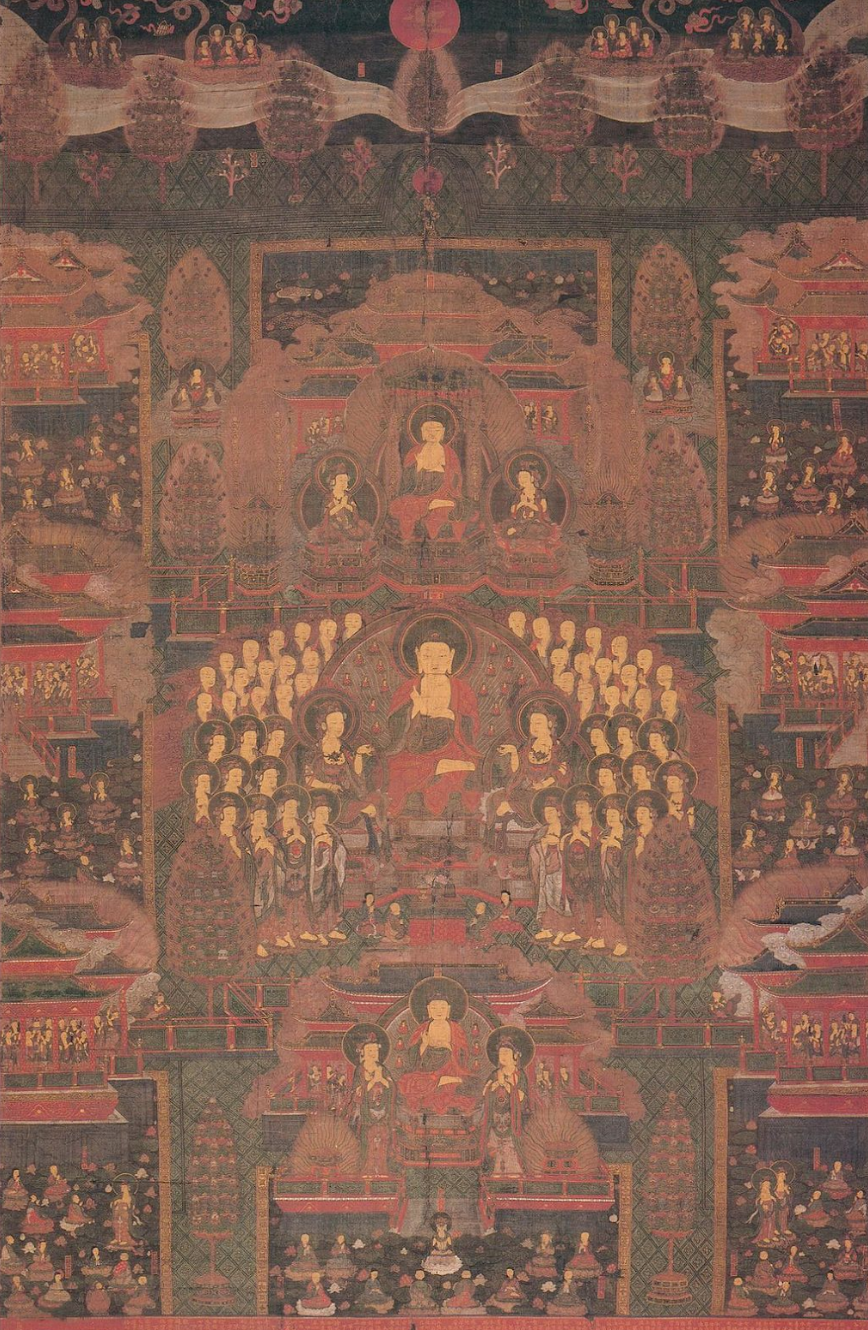
Transformation Tableau of the Visualization Sutra. Goryeo, fourteenth century. Hanging scroll, color on silk. 202.8 x 129.8 cm. Saifukuji. Tsuruga-shi, Fukui-ken, Japan.

A study of the paintings show that these paintings have been created by trained experts who utilised premium quality paints as well metallic paint including gold and silver. These paintings are characterised by exquisite and minute aspects like facial features, embroidery on the garments and jewellery design amongst other precise details. This group of paintings commonly feature figures wearing delicate garments drawn in a manner that give the illusion of transparency. The durable condition of the surface has been attributed to the use of a thin base-coat of lead which was applied onto the bodies which was followed by the application of exquisite jewels, veils, pendants and medallions along with other materials. Not only do the use of gold details show that these paintings could only be afforded by royal commissions, but the naturalism of the clothing illustration provides evidence for refined techniques which could only be achieved with centralized support for Buddhist art via the king’s personal engagement or aristocratic support entrusting Buddhist art with the protection of the nation, thus ensuring the patronage of ritual artworks. Owing to the quality, cost of expensive art material and that these artworks were commissioned by the royals and nobles of the Goryeo society show that there is a very high probability that the masses may not have seen these paintings. Commoner exposure was likely through large-scale public means such as through temples, sculptures, or national festivals. The quality of the Goryeo paintings made it only affordable to the royal families and the aristocracy.

A hierarchy is illustrated in the Transformation Tableau of the Visualization Sutra and Meditation Sutra Bianxiangtu. Numerous layers and divisions can be observed in both these paintings when viewed from top to bottom, which could indicate a cultural standard for the hierarchy of rebirth: rebirth in the superior class for bodhisattvas, rebirth in the middle class for monks and nuns, and rebirth in the inferior class for lay people. It can thus be drawn that most of Korean society at this time still maintained a hierarchy of social status and access points to religion- though it was sanctioned by the state, not everyone had the same access.

== Key Paintings ==
=== Amitabha (first half of the 14th century) ===
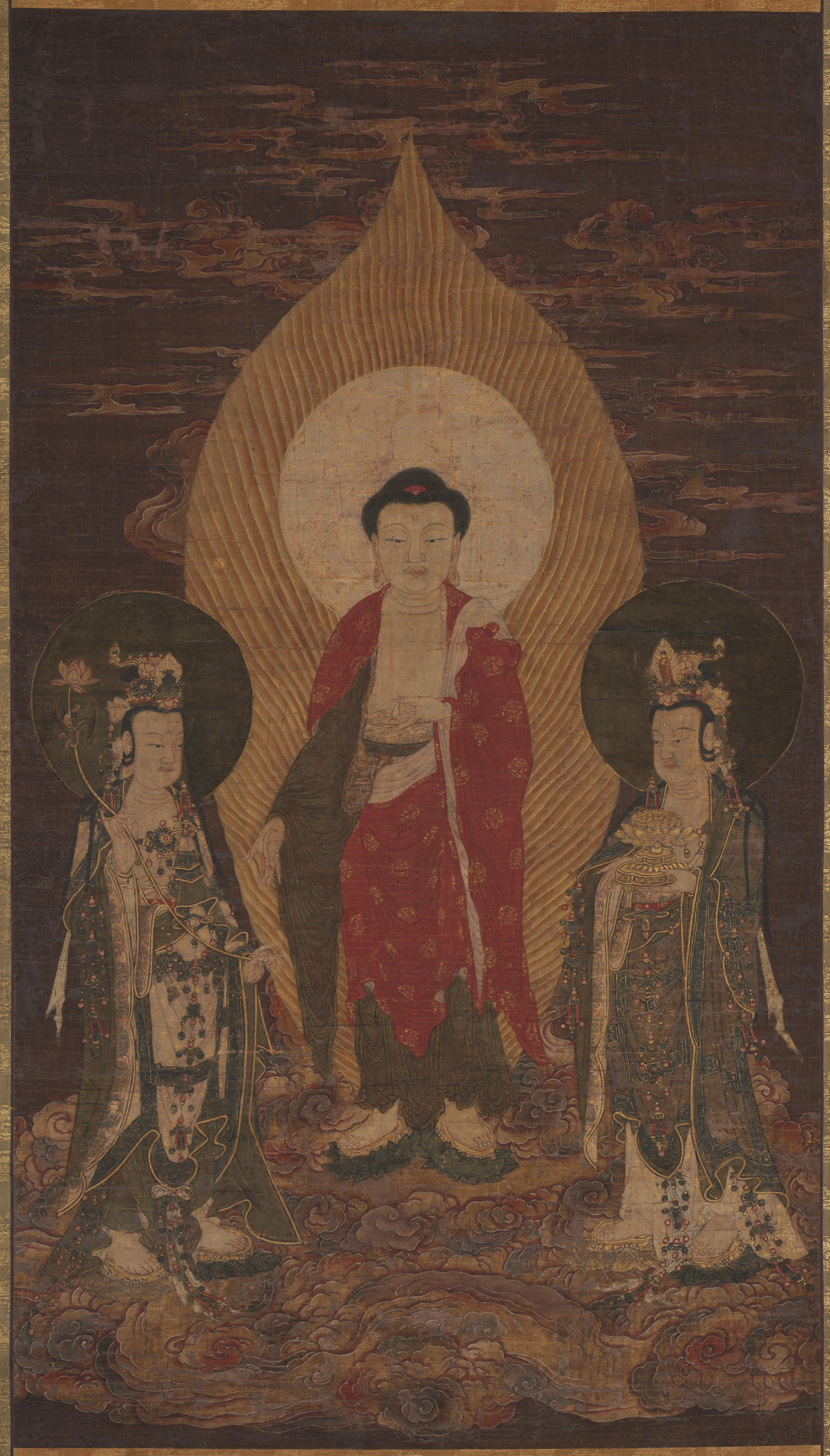
Welcoming Descent of the Amitabha Triad. 15th c. H. 119.1 cm, w. 53.3 cm. Cleveland Museum of Art.

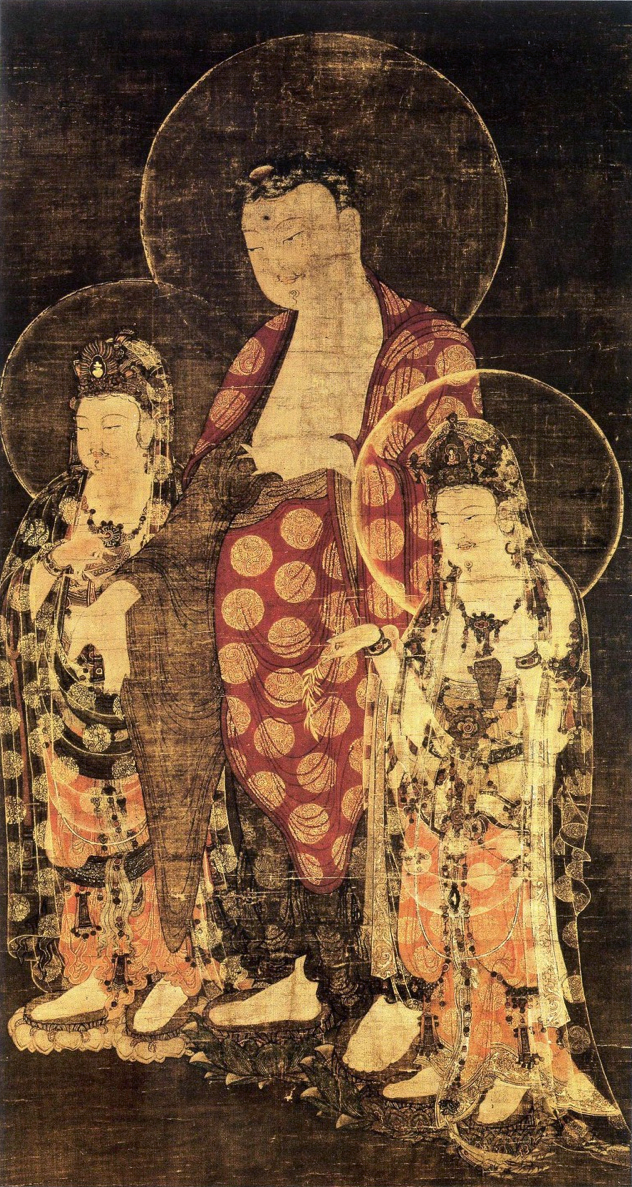
Amitabha Triad (MOA Museum of Art)

During the Unified Silla period preceding the Goryeo dynasty, there was a rise in popularity of “Pure Land Buddhism” due to anxiety and unrest over the hierarchical instability and Mongol invasions. Thus, themes of the afterlife, salvation, and enlightenment became a major focus of the art being produced. Pure Land Buddhism taught that rebirth in paradise was accessible to anyone who committed good deeds and believed in Amitabha, compared to previous forms of Buddhism where enlightenment required long periods of study that were not realistically attainable. The main deity, Buddha Amitabha, was commonly depicted in Goryeo art in an “Amitabha triad” along with the bodhisattvas Avalokiteshvara and Ksitigarbha or any other two bodhisattvas. This depiction is also known as a representation of “the Welcoming Descent”. The two works Welcoming Descent of the Amitabha Triad, currently housed in the Cleveland Museum of Art, and The Welcoming Descent of the Amitabha Triad in the Museum of Art in Atami, Japan, are both primary examples of this subgenre. Within these triads, Amitabha Buddha is in the center while flanked by a bodhisattva on either side. In The Welcoming Descent of the Amitabha Triad, all of the deities are standing in a three-quarters stance which is typical of most Goryeo Welcoming Descent art, and this is interpreted as an implied movement toward an imaginary dying believer outside of the frame and viewing the image as part of a deathbed ritual. This type of Welcoming Descent painting is hypothesized to have originated from the Ningbo area of China in the fourteenth century before being imported to Japan. During this period, trade between Korea, Japan, and China via the port of Ningbo made it likely that such a full representation of the Welcoming Descent was also imported into Goryeo and even reproduced there as well. In Welcoming Descent of the Amitabha Triad, however, the central Buddha Amitabha is uniquely depicted from a frontal point of view looking out from the painting directly at the viewer, which has the effect of strengthening the emotional relationship between the worshiper and the art. Frontal representations of the Welcoming Descent were popular in Japan during the late Kamakura period from 1185-1333. When adapted to Korean Buddhist iconography, the Japanese influence on Buddha Amitabha representations resulted in a greater capacity of the paintings to evoke visual empathy because the simple composition occupying the whole pictorial space helps the viewer concentrate on the deities; the image simulates the moment of meeting with Amitabha face-to-face.

=== Kshitigarbha (first half of the 14th century) ===
A compassionate bodhisattva who rescues sentient beings from descending into hell or purgatory, Kshitigarbha became enormously popular during the Goryeo period. A key figure in Pure Land Buddhism, Kshitigarbha was often depicted singly and in the guise of a monk—with a shaved head, or wearing a headscarf. He is clad in a formal robe (samghāti) and is adorned with jewelry, including a necklace and wrist band or bangles, similar to other bodhisattvas. In most Goryeo Buddhist paintings, he is shown holding a cintāmani, a wish-granting crystal ball, and/or a monk’s staff. This exquisite scroll and artwork is a well-preserved example of Goryeo Buddhist painting; some of its hallmarks are the deity’s graceful facial features and slender figures, the red and green colors of the robe, and the sumptuously elegant gold decoration. Kshitigarbha appears in various compositions: as a single figure, as part of a triad, or accompanied by heavenly being and the Ten Kings of Hell. Among these, the most frequent arrangement is of the bodhisattva standing alone (as seen here), as if looking directly at the devotee. The Kshitigarbha Bodhisattva is a leading deity responsible for the salvation of all sentient beings in the Buddha-less time between the nirvāna of Śākyamuni, the historical Buddha, and the advent of Maitreya, the future Buddha yet to be born. As a primary bodhisattva in the Six Paths of Incarnation, into which a sentient being would be reborn according to the karma it has accumulated, Kshitigarbha has also popularly been called Lord of the Underworld and has long been worshipped in East Asia. Kshitigarbha’s ability to rescue individuals who had been sent to hell and thus to ensure the well-being of deceased relatives and oneself after leaving this world was greatly appealing to the public. Hence, this deity became one of the most frequently painted—and one of the most significant—Buddhist icons of the Goryeo period. Very few Korean paintings made prior to the 14th century survive; Buddhist paintings of the Goryeo dynasty are renowned for their delicacy and refinement. Most, if not all, were commissioned by members of the royal family and the aristocracy and were painted by monk painters or professional court painters.

=== Water-Moon Avalokiteśvara, first half of the 14th century ===
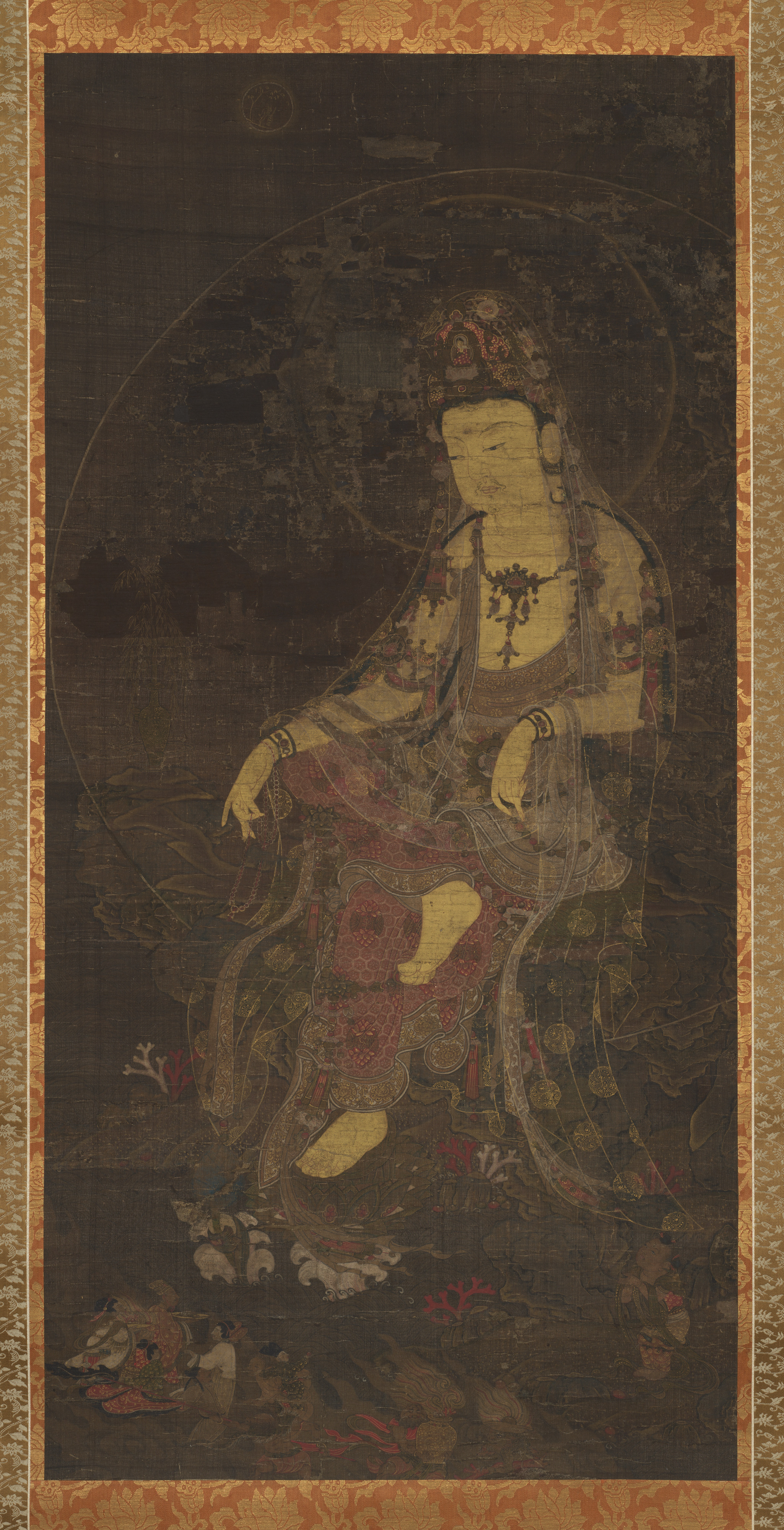
Water-Moon Avalokiteshvara, first half, 14th century

The Water-Moon Avalokiteśvara (Suwol Gwaneum) is an iconographic type that was widely popular during the Goryeo Dynasty. This painting depicts the resplendently attired bodhisattva in a three-quarter view, seated on a rocky outcrop protruding from the sea in his mountain-island abode, Mount Potalaka, where water flows from numerous springs, and the landscape is populated by fragrant grass, flowers, marvelous trees, and coral. At the top is a diminutive moon, in which a hare pounds the elixir of immortality. At the bodhisattva’s feet, the dragon king leads a group of elegantly dressed miniature figures—behind them follow sea monsters bearing precious gifts. In the lower right-hand corner of the painting, the boy pilgrim Sudhana, who travels to seek enlightenment and wisdom, appears in a pose of adoration. The Avalokiteśvara sits with her right leg crossed and her left foot placed on a lotus-flower support, holding a crystal rosary in her hand. The delicate and intricate gold-painted design on the robes of the deities is a noteworthy trademark of Goryeo Buddhist paintings. The garments are exquisitely drawn and developed through the ample use of mineral pigments accented with gold, and illusionary effects are seen in the depiction of semitransparent veils. In the lower portion of this artwork, long transparent veils extend from the Avalokiteśvara’s crown to the pond, adorned with patterns of white hemp leaves or white medallions filled with flower patterns and plant scroll designs. This use of flowers and nature is further exemplified through the presence of the willow tree, whose motif may symbolize the cleansing and healing power of the deity (and happens to be closely related to Chinese Buddhist paintings of the Western Xia dynasty). Goryeo Buddhist paintings were uniquely made by applying color to both the front and back of the silk canvas. By utilizing the reverse side of the canvas, artists creating Buddhist artworks were able to create subtle effects, intensifying and contrasting with the primary colors painted on the front. Gold was extensively used to delineate figures and accentuate the decorative patterns on robes and jewelry. Goryeo Buddhist paintings also frequently included secular and mythical figures, depicted as worshippers or patrons. They are often members of the royalty, aristocrats, or donors of paintings, wearing elegant court dress and elaborate hairdos decorated with jewelry and gold. These depictions allow the viewer a glimpse into the taste for luxury and splendor amongst the ruling class in Goryeo Society.

== The dragon king and his retinue, detail of Water-Moon Avalokitesvara, color on silk ==
For instance, in this Water-Moon Avalokiteśvara painting, a group of worshippers is shown in the lower corner of this painting, kneeling and holding their hands together in a gesture of courtesy. They are identified as the mythical dragon king of the Eastern Sea, his queen, his royal entourage, and monsters bearing offerings of incense, coral, and pearls to the deity. Despite their small scale in proportion to the rest of this painting, these figures play an important role in the painting as well as the Buddhist ritual context, acting as intermediaries between the secular and sacred worlds and inviting the viewer to the scene. This idea of ‘sacredness’ is further exemplified when considering the hare pounding the elixir or immortality in the first Avalokiteśvara painting discussed, a Daoist motif frequently found in tombs of the Han dynasty and Koguryeo kingdom, yet also appearing in Goryeo Water-Moon Avalokiteśvara paintings. This is an interesting example of how a myth predating Buddhism was incorporated into Buddhist paintings without particular textual references, blurring boundaries between folklore and sacred content in Goryeo Buddhist art. Motifs from indigenous myths, miraculous stories, and folklore predating Buddhism were also incorporated in depictions of this deity to highlight his spiritual power. For instance, the blue bird, the dragon king, the rosary, and the pair of bamboo stalks in the Water-Moon Avalokiteśvara are related to stories about the famous Korean monks Ŭisang and Wonhyo and their miraculous encounters with Avalokiteśvara. A rabbit pounding the elixir of immortality under a laurel tree in the moonlight is another motif derived from a myth of ancient pre-Buddhist China, which tells of a rabbit (whose image can be seen on the face of the moon) who uses a mortar and pestle to prepare a life-giving potion for the Moon Goddess. Painted in vibrant colors of red, green, and blue with gold pigments, exquisite Goryeo Water-Moon Avalokiteśvara paintings represent the religious fervor of ardent believers in Pure Land Buddhism, as well as the splendid material culture of upper-class Goryeo society.

== Goryeo Buddhist Architecture ==
Founded under the Goryeo Dynasty at the start of the 11th century, and named for the Buddhist deity Samantabhadra, this temple flourished as one of the greatest centers of Buddhism in the north of Korea, and became a renowned place of pilgrimage. Although Goryeo Buddhist temples have many features in common, each one is unique, affected by the location where the temple was built, in addition to the purpose for which it was used. One common element is that all temples are built following principles of geomancy, considering the topography of the land on which the temple is built. The overall layout of the temple should depict an image of the Buddhist paradise; very often, the approach to the front gate of the main temple compound is a winding path that crosses a stream. Arriving at the end of the path, there presents a series of gates reflecting Buddhist teachings. The first gate of Pohyonsa (called Jogye Gate) is built with just two posts, and thus will appear to be only one post when viewed from the side. This stylistic choice represents the unity of mind that is needed to enter the temple. The second gate (called Haetal Gate) protects the temple. This gate houses four statues of guardians carved from wood; the guardians represent the power of wisdom over ignorance. The third gate (called Chonwang Gate) is seen afterward and represents the non-duality of all things in Buddhist teaching. This gate is elevated and directly faces the temple’s main hall. As one passes from gate to gate, one may also pass large polished stones called ‘Stele’ recounting the temple’s history, or names of those who donated to the temple’s construction. There are also ‘pubo’, large stones, sometimes adorned with hats, where the remains of revered monks are located. Entering the temple, the main Buddha hall—where ceremonies are held—presents itself immediately. In front of the main hall, there are one or two pagodas and stone lamps. The pagoda represents the Buddha and the teaching, and houses some important symbols—a relic of the Buddha, an important sutra, or other religious artifacts. In addition to the principal pagoda in front of the main Buddha hall, there are also pagodas in other places in the compound; small shrines to different Bodhisattvas are also present. Furthermore, there are small halls on each side of the main compound, named for the Buddha enshrined inside—these may include: Daeungjeon (for the historical Buddha Sakyamuni), Daejeokgwangjeon (for the cosmic Buddha Vairocana), and Kungnakjeon (dedicated to the Buddha of Infinite Life and Light).

== Modern Impact ==
Far-reaching influences of Goryeo Buddhism can still be observed in modern Korea and beyond. For instance, most of the remaining collections today are in Japan where the artpieces were illegally collected by Japanese collectors during the Japanese Occupation of Korea. One of the main iconographies in Goryeo paintings, the Bodhisattva Ksitigarbha, began to be worshiped as an independent deity during the Joseon dynasty (1392-1910). A modern interpretation of Ksitigarbha as a deity by Korean artist Kim Seok-gon maintains clear aspects of Goryeo Buddhist elements, including a plain background, the use of primary colors, and a similar visual layout to the Amitabha triad. Moving away from the original use of such Buddhist art, Kim wanted to “reflect contemporary values in the traditional artwork and shed overtly religious images”, according to his 2021 interview in The Korea Times. The initial Pure Land Buddhism beliefs that produced art which worshipers could project into to achieve salvation have now evolved in modern Korea into a greater emphasis on universal identification by any person, regardless of their goals or beliefs.

== Conclusion ==
The growing discourses regarding the significant Buddhist paintings from the Goryeo period has resulted in increasing academic interest amongst both the researchers and the common people. Goryeo Buddhist paintings had a profound impact on how Koreans of the time perceived rebirth and salvation, and these beliefs had roots from a variety of other cultures. The unique Korean impact combined with the preexisting overlap of global influences make Goryeo Buddhism a powerful motivator of contemporary art as the traditions and core beliefs of Goryeo Buddhist paintings are constantly being adapted to fit the changing needs of modern society.

In order to provide easy access to the paintings, a website was launched in 2019 Presented by the Freer and Sackler galleries and the Cultural Heritage Administration, the digital catalogue is titled “Goryeo Buddhist Painting: A Closer Look”. Interested viewers can go through this website and gain access to 16 paintings owned by galleries such as, Metropolitan Museum of Art, Asian Art Museum, Freer and Sackler, Harvard University Art Museums, Museum of Fine Arts, Boston, Cleveland Museum of Art, Arthur M. Sackler Museum, Rhode Island School of Design Museum. In addition to this resource, books such as, “Buddhist Paintings of Goryeo” by Moon Myung-Dae also provides detailed description of the paintings along with the background history, stylistic, thematic aspects and commentary on the exquisite use of colours.
