= Korean influence on Japanese culture =

Korean influence on Japanese culture refers to the impact of continental Asian influences transmitted through or originating in the Korean Peninsula on Japanese institutions, culture, language and society. Since the Korean Peninsula was the cultural bridge between Japan and China throughout much of East Asian history, these influences have been detected in a variety of aspects of Japanese culture, including technology, philosophy, art, and artistic techniques.

Notable examples of Korean influence on Japanese culture include the prehistoric migration of Korean peninsular peoples to Japan near the end of Japan's Jōmon period and the introduction of Buddhism to Japan via the Kingdom of Baekje in 538 AD. From the mid-fifth to the late-seventh centuries, Japan benefited from the immigration of people from Baekje and Gaya who brought with them their knowledge of iron metallurgy, stoneware pottery, law, and Chinese writing. These people were known as Toraijin. The modulation of continental styles of art in Korea has also been discerned in Japanese painting and architecture, ranging from the design of Buddhist temples to smaller objects such as statues, textiles and ceramics. Late in the sixteenth century, the Japanese invasions of Korea produced considerable cross-cultural contact. Korean craftsmen who came to Japan at this time were responsible for a revolution in Japanese pottery making.

Many Korean influences on Japan originated in China, but were adapted and modified in Korea before reaching Japan. The role of ancient Korean states in the transmission of continental civilization has long been neglected, and is increasingly the object of academic study. However, Korean and Japanese nationalisms have complicated the interpretation of these influences.

== Prehistoric Korean peninsular influences on the Japanese archipelago ==
Between 800 and 600 BC, new technology and cultural objects began appearing in Japan, starting in Kyushu. Gradually the Jōmon culture was supplanted across Japan by the Yayoi culture that practiced wet-rice farming. According to the historians Gina Barnes and Satoru Nakazono, this represented a cultural flow from southern Korea to Kyushu. By contrast, Charles T. Keally argues that wet-rice farming, which was originally practiced in China, could also have come to Kyushu directly from China.

The result was rapid growth in the Japanese population during the Yayoi period and subsequent Kofun period. Japanese people also began to use metal tools, arrowheads, new forms of pottery, moats, burial mounds, and styles of housing which were of peninsular origin. A significant cause of these dramatic changes in Japanese society was likely an influx of immigrants from southern Korea. Historian Hiroshi Tsude estimated that as many as 1.8 million Koreans immigrated to Japan during the Yayoi period. According to Satoru Nakazono, this period was "characterized by the systematic introduction of Korean peninsula culture".

According to Japanese historian Tadashi Nishitani, the Yoshinogari site, an archeological site in Kyushu dating from the late Yayoi period, appears virtually identical to villages in the Korean peninsula of the same period. By contrast, the burial mounds at Yoshinogari show signs of influence from the Chinese Lelang Commandery. During this period Japan imported great numbers of peninsular mirrors and daggers, which were the symbols of power in Korea. Combined with the curved jewel known as the magatama, Korea's "three treasures" soon became as prized by Japan's elites as Korea's, and in Japan they later became the Imperial Regalia.

== Korean influences on ancient and classical Japan ==
With the beginning of the Kofun period around 250 CE, the building of gigantic tomb called kofun indicates the emergence of powerful warrior elites, fueled by more intensive agriculture and the introduction of iron technologies. Contact with the continental mainland increased, as Japan undertook intensive contacts with the southern Korean littoral ruling groups, in pursuit of securing supplies of iron and other material goods, while sending emissaries to China (in 238, 243 and 247). A pattern developed of intense military and political dealings with peninsular Korean powers that continued for four centuries. For Hyung Il Pai, there was no clear Korean and Japanese national distinction for the period around the 4th century CE.

Cultural contact with Korea, which at the time was divided into several independent states, played a decisive role in the development of Japanese government and society both during the Kofun period and the subsequent Classical period. Most innovations flowed from Korea into Japan, and not vice versa, primarily due to Korea's closer proximity to China. Though many of the ideas and technologies which filtered into Japan from Korea were originally Chinese, historian William Wayne Farris notes that Korean peninsular peoples put "their distinctive stamp on" them before passing them on to Japan. Some such innovations were imported to Japan through trade, but in more cases they were brought to Japan by peninsular immigrants. The Yamato state that eventually unified Japan accomplished this partly due to its success at gaining a monopoly on the importation of Korean peninsular culture and technology into Japan. According to Farris, Japanese cultural borrowing from Korea "hit peaks in the mid-fifth, mid-sixth, and late seventh centuries" and "helped to define a material culture that lasted as long as a thousand years".

=== Immigration from ancient Korea to Japan ===
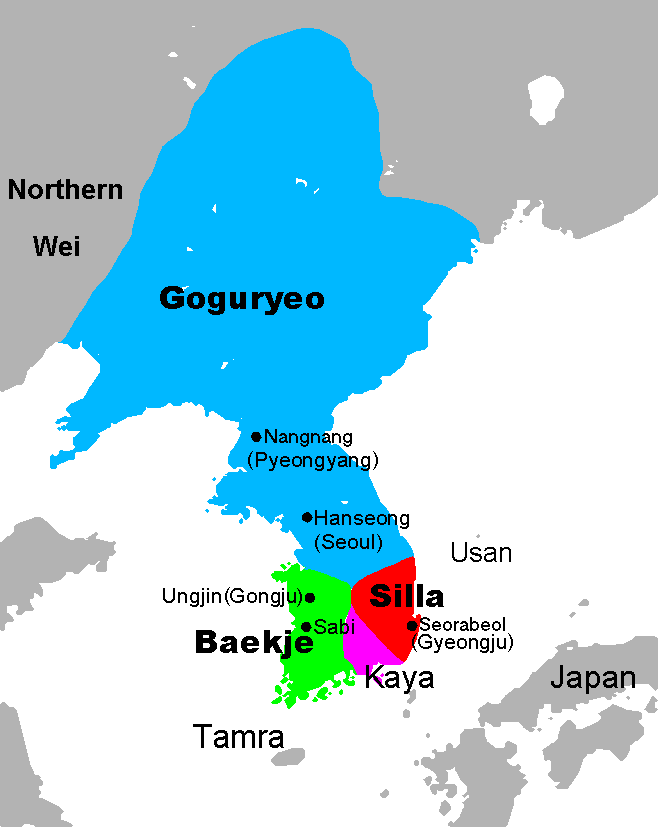
Throughout much of ancient Japanese history Korea was divided into several warring kingdoms.

During this period a significant factor behind the transfer of peninsular Korean culture to Japan was immigration from Korea. Most peninsular immigrants, generically known as kikajin in Japanese, came during a period of intense regional warfare which racked the Korean peninsula between the late fourth and late seventh centuries. Japanese traditions held that the Yamato kingdom has sent military expeditions to assist Baekje as early as 369 CE, military aid that is said to have enabled the latter to secure control of Naktong against its enemies, Silla and Goguryeo.

Many of these immigrants, who were welcomed by the Japanese government, were from Baekje and Gaya. These refugees brought their culture to Japan with them, and once there they often became leading officials, artists, and craftsmen. Korean peninsular immigrants and their descendants played a significant role in Japan's cultural missions to Sui China, and some peninsular families are even said to have married into the Imperial Family. By 700, it has been conjectured, perhaps one third of all Japanese aristocrats may have been of relatively recent peninsular origin, including the Aya clan. Although peninsular immigrants settled throughout Japan, they were especially concentrated in Nara, the region where the Japanese capital was located. According to one estimate, from 80 to 90 percent of people in Takaichi District of Nara had Baekje ancestry by the year 773, and recent anatomical analyses indicate that modern-day Japanese people living in this area continue to be more closely related to ethnic Koreans than any other in Japan.

The Soga clan, a clan with close ties to the Baekje elite, may also have been of Baekje ancestry. Scholars who have argued in favor of the theory that the Soga had peninsular ancestry include Teiji Kadowaki and William Wayne Farris.

=== Arms and armament ===
During most of the Kofun period Japan relied on Korea as its sole source of iron swords, spears, armor, and helmets. Cuirasses and later Japan's first lamellar armor, as well as subsequent innovations in producing them, arrived in Japan from Korea, particularly from Silla and Gaya. Japan's first crossbow was delivered by Goguryeo in 618.

At a time in history when horses were a key military weapon, Baekje immigrants also established Japan's first horse-raising farms in what would become Japan's Kawachi Province. One historian, Koichi Mori, theorizes that Emperor Keitai's close friendships with Baekje horsemen played an important role in helping him to assume the throne. Japan's first trappings, such as bits, stirrups, saddles, and bridles were also imported from the peninsula by the early fifth century.

In 660, following the fall of its ally, Baekje, the Japanese Emperor Tenji utilized Baekje's skilled technicians to construct at least seven fortresses to protect Japan's coastline from invasion. Japan's mountain fortifications in particular were based on peninsular models.

=== Pottery ===
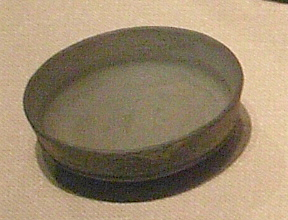
Sue ware

In the early fifth century high-fired stoneware pottery began to be imported from Kaya and Silla to Japan, and soon after stoneware technologies such as the tunnel kiln and potter's wheel also made their way from Korea to Japan. This allowed the Japanese to produce their own stoneware, which came to be called sue ware, and was eventually produced on a large scale throughout Japan. This new pottery came to Japan alongside immigrants from Korea, possibly southern Korea which was under attack from Goguryeo.

=== Ovens ===
The stove known as the kamado was of continental origin, having been invented in China but was modified in by the peninsular peoples before it was introduced to Japan. According to the historian William Wayne Farris, the introduction of the kamado "had a profound effect on daily life in ancient Japan" and "represented a major advance for residents of Japan's pit dwellings". The hearth ovens (ro:炉/maiyōro:埋甕炉) previously used to cook meals and heat homes were less safe, more difficult to use, and less heat efficient, and by the seventh century the kamado was in widespread use in Japan. According to Farris, Japanese people referred to the kamado as kara kamado, which can be translated into English as "Korean ovens". However, in some parts of northeastern Japan, open-hearth ovens continued to be preferred.

=== Sewing ===
According to the Nihon Shoki, all the seamstresses of the village of Kume (來目) in Yamato province hailed from a sewing woman, Maketsu (眞毛津) who was given as tribute by the king of Baekje to the Yamato court.

=== Iron tools and iron metallurgy ===
According to Farris, during the Kofun period, Korea was the source for most of Japan's iron tools, including chisels, saws, sickles, axes, spades, hoes, and plows. Historically, the source of iron ingots in Korea was cut off when Yamato forces suffered defeats with their peninsular allies in 405, and again, later in 475, and, immigrant smelters developed furnaces to reuse the available iron. Later, after 450 CE, the Kinai elite found substitutes in local sands available by Placer mining to make up the shortfall. Korean iron farming tools in particular contributed to a rise in Japan's population by possibly 250 to 300 percent.

However, it was the refugees who came after 400 from Gaya, a Korean state famous for its iron production, who established some of Japan's first native iron foundries. The work of these Gayan refugees eventually permitted Japan to escape from its dependency on importing iron tools, armor, and weapons from Korea. The techniques of iron production which they brought to Japan are uniquely Korean and distinct from those used in China.

=== Dams and irrigation ===
The Japanese adapted continental U-shaped hoes and techniques for creating irrigation ponds. Extensive works uncovered in the Furuichi site near Osaka display developments far in advance of Yayoi period, and the suggestion is that both the technology and pond construction techniques were introduced by peninsular peoples from southern Korea.

=== Government and administration ===
The centralization of the Japanese state in the sixth and seventh centuries also owes a debt to developments on the Korean Peninsula. In 535 the Japanese government established military garrisons called "miyake" throughout Japan to control regional powers and in many cases staffed them with Korean immigrants. Soon after a system of "be", government-regulated groups of artisans, was created, as well as a new level of local administration and a tribute tax. All of these were likely influenced by similar systems used in Baekje and other parts of Korea. Likewise Prince Shōtoku's Twelve Level Cap and Rank System of 603, a form a meritocracy implemented for Japanese government positions, was influenced by that of Baekje.

Immigrants from Korea also played a role in drafting many important Japanese legal reforms of the era, including the Taika Reform. Half of the individuals actively involved in drafting Japan's Taihō Code of 703 were Korean.

=== Writing ===
Scribes from the Korean state of Baekje who wrote Chinese introduced writing to Japan in the early fifth century. The man traditionally credited as being the first to teach writing in Japan is the Baekje scholar Wani. Though a small number of Japanese people were able to read Chinese before then, it was thanks to the work of scribes from Baekje that the use of writing was popularized among the Japanese governing elite. For hundreds of years thereafter a steady stream of talented scribes would be sent from Korea to Japan, and some of these scholars from Baekje wrote and edited much of the Nihon Shoki, one of Japan's earliest works of history.

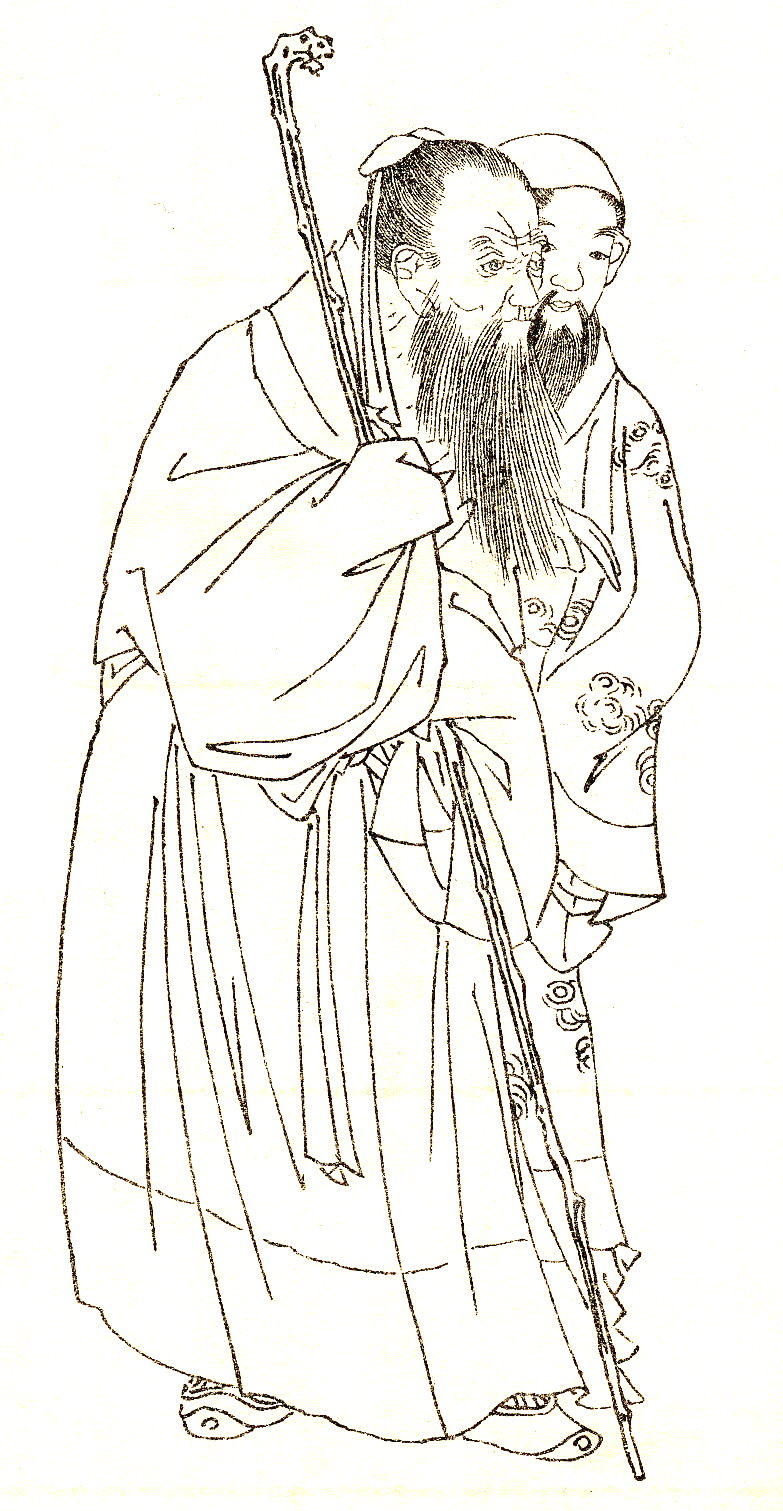
The Korean scholar Wani is credited by ancient sources with introducing written language to Japan.

According to Bjarke Frellesvig, "There is ample evidence, in the form of orthographic 'Koreanisms' in the early inscriptions in Japan, that the writing practices employed in Japan were modelled on continental examples". The history of how the early Japanese modified the Chinese writing system to develop a native phonogram orthography is obscure, but scribal techniques developed in the Korean peninsular played an important role in the process of developing Man'yōgana. The pronunciation of Chinese characters at this period thus may well reflect that current in the Baekje kingdom. Frellesvig states, "However, writing extensive text passages entirely or mostly phonographically, reflected in the widespread use of man'yōgana, is a practice not attested in Korean sources which therefore seems to be an independent development which took place in Japan." Japanese katakana share many symbols with Korean Gugyeol, for example, suggesting the former arose in part at least from scribal practices in Korea, though the historical connections between the two systems are obscure.

=== Science, medicine, and math ===
In the wake of Emperor Kinmei's dispatch of ambassadors to Baekje in 553, several Korean soothsayers, doctors, and calendrical scholars were sent to Japan. The Baekje Buddhist priest and physician Gwalleuk came to Japan in 602, and, settling in the Genkōji temple(現光寺) where he played a notable role in establishing the Sanron school, instructed several court students in the Chinese mathematics of astronomy and calendrical science. He introduced the Chinese Yuán Jiā Lì (元嘉暦) calendrical system (developed by Hé Chéng Tiān (何承天) in 443 C.E.) and transmitted his skill in medicine and pharmacy to Japanese disciples, such as Hinamitachi (日並立)

According to Nakayama Shigeru, nearly all 7th century astronomers in Japan came from Baekje, and only by the following century did the percentage of immigrant astronomers fall to 40% as local astronomers mastered the science. Native Japanese astronomers were gradually trained and by the eighth century only forty percent of Japanese astronomers were Korean. Furthermore, the Ishinpō, a Japanese medical text written in 984, still contains many medical formulas of Korean origin. During this same period, Japanese farmers divided their arable land using a system of measurement devised in Korea.

=== Shipbuilding ===
Technicians sent from the Korean kingdom of Silla introduced advanced shipbuilding techniques to Japan for the first time. An immigrant group 'the Inabe', closely associated with shipbuilding, was made up of carpenters who had come to Japan from Silla. In the first half of the 9th century, the private fleet of the Silla merchant Chang Pogo dominated the Yellow Sea and maritime trade between China and Japan; the superiority of Korean shipbuilding technology was recognized by Fujiwara no Tsunetsugu, and as ambassador to China he chartered Korean vessels as they were more seaworthy for his embassy to the mainland in 838. A Japanese court edict issued in 839 ordered that Kyūshū construct a 'Silla ship', which were better that coping with stormy weather. Baekje may also have contributed shipbuilding technology to Japan.

==== Navigation ====
Ancient Koreans were commercially active throughout East Asia, and their mastery of navigation allowed them to pursue trade interests as far away as the East Indies. In 526, a Baekje Korean monk Gyeomik traveled to India via the southern sea route and mastered Sanskrit, specializing in Vinaya studies. He came back with a collection of Vinaya texts to Baekje, accompanied by the Indian monk Paedalta(Vedatta).

In the 9th century, Japanese had not mastered the skill and knowledge necessary for safe ocean navigation in their part of the world. Consequently, the Japanese monk-traveler Ennin tended to rely on the Korean sailors and traders on his travels, at the time when the men of Silla were the master of the seas achieving Korean maritime dominance in eastern Asia. The monk Ennin’s crossing to China on Japanese vessels and the whole catastrophic maritime record of the mission contrast sharply with the speed and efficiency with which Sillan ships quickly brought him back home to Japan. Another indication of the gap in navigation skill between the Sillans and Japanese at this time was the employment by the Japanese embassy of 60 Korean helmsmen and sailors to help get the main party safely home.

==== Maritime trade ====
It seems that commerce between East China, Korea and Japan was, for the most part, in the hands of men from Silla, accompanied by Silla Korean hegemony over the maritime commerce of East Asia. Here in the relatively dangerous waters on the eastern fringes of the world, the Koreans performed the same functions as did the traders of the calm Mediterranean on the western fringes.

The Shōsōin is a great Japanese reservoir of the Oriental art of the 7th and 8th centuries when the art and culture of Asia reached the height of its development. Among the Shōsōin treasures at Todai-ji in Nara there are more than 20 sheets of purchase orders (one dated as early as 752), indicating that the favorite luxury goods they imported from Korean Silla included perfume, medicine, cosmetics, fabric dying materials, metallic goods, musical instruments, carpets, and measuring tools. Some were made in Silla; Others were of foreign origin, probably from Southeast Asia, India or South Asia.

=== Buddhism ===
After striking an agreement on cultural exchanges, Japan received Confucian scholars from Baekje in the years 513 and 516. Later King Seong sent Buddhist sutras and a statue of Buddha to Japan, an event described by historian Robert Buswell as "one of the two most critical influences in the entire history of Japan, rivaled only by the nineteenth-century encounter with Western culture". The year this occurred, dated by historians to either 538 or 552, marks the official introduction of Buddhism into Japan, and within a year of this date Baekje provided Japan with nine Buddhists priests to aid in propagating the faith.

Baekje continued to supply Japan with Buddhist monks for the remainder of its existence. In 587 the monk P'ungguk arrived from Baekje to serve as a tutor to Emperor Yōmei's younger brother and later settled down as the first abbot of Japan's Shitennō-ji Temple. In 595 the monk Hyeja arrived in Japan from Goguryeo. He became a mentor to Prince Shōtoku and lived in Asuka Temple. By the reign of the Japanese Empress Suiko (592–628), there were over one thousand monks and nuns living in Japan, a substantial percentage of whom were Korean.

A great many Buddhist writings published during Korea's Goryeo dynasty (918–1392) were also highly influential upon their arrival in Japan. Such Korean ideas would play an important role in the development of Japanese Pure Land Buddhism. The Japanese monk Shinran was among those known to be influenced by Korean Buddhism, particularly by the Sillan monk Gyeongheung. Robert Buswell notes that the form of Buddhism Korea was propagating throughout its history was "a vibrant cultural tradition in its own right" and that Korea did not serve simply as a "bridge" between China and Japan.

== Medieval artistic influence ==
According to the scholar Insoo Cho, Korean artwork has had a "huge impact" on Japan throughout history, though until recently the subject was often neglected within academia. Beatrix von Ragué has noted that in particular, "one can hardly underestimate the role which, from the fifth to the seventh centuries, Korean artists and craftsmen played in the early art ... of Japan."

=== Lacquerwork ===
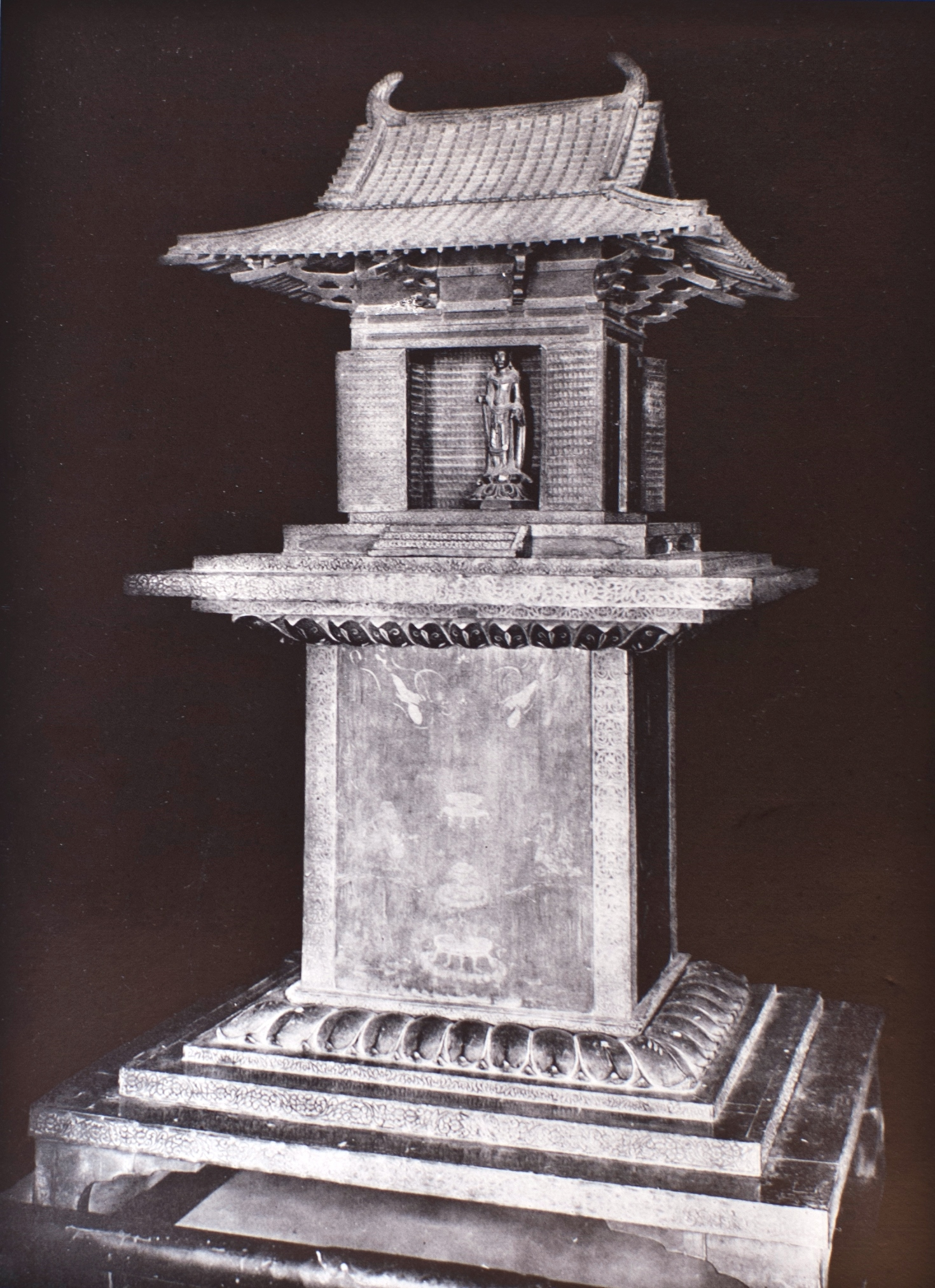
Tamamushi Shrine

According to the historian Beatrix von Ragué, "the oldest example of the true art of lacquerwork to have survived in Japan" is Tamamushi Shrine, a miniature shrine in Horyū-ji Temple. Tamamushi Shrine was created in Korean style, and was probably made by either a Japanese artist or a Korean artist living in Japan. It is decorated with an inlay composed of the wings of tamamushi beetles that, according to von Ragué, "is evidently native to Korea." However, Tamamushi Shrine is also painted in a manner similar to Chinese paintings of the sixth century.

Japanese lacquerware teabowls, boxes, and tables of the Azuchi–Momoyama period (1568–1600) also show signs of Korean artistic influence. The mother-of-pearl inlay frequently used in this lacquerwork is of clearly Korean origin.

=== Painting ===
The immigration of Korean and Chinese painters to Japan during the Asuka period transformed Japanese art. For instance, in the year 610 Damjing, a Buddhist monk from Goguryeo, brought paints, brushes, and paper to Japan. Damjing is credited with introducing the arts of papermaking and of preparing pigments to Japan for the first time, and he is also regarded as the artist behind the wall painting in the main hall of Japan's Horyu-ji Temple which was later burned down in a fire.

However, it was during the Muromachi period (1337–1573) of Japanese history that Korean influence on Japanese painting reached its peak. Korean art and artists frequently arrived on Japan's shores, influencing both the style and theme of Japanese ink painting. The two most important Japanese ink painters of the period were Shūbun, whose art displays many of the characteristic features of Korean painting, and Sumon, who was himself an immigrant from Korea. Consequently, one Japanese historian, Sokuro Wakimoto, has even described the period between 1394 and 1486 as the "Era of Korean Style" in Japanese ink painting.

Then during the sixteenth and seventeenth centuries, as a result of the Joseon missions to Japan, the Japanese artists who were developing nanga painting came into close contact with Korean artists. Though Japanese nanga received inspiration from many sources, the historian Burglind Jungmann concludes that Korean namjonghwa painting "may well have been the most important for creating the Nanga style". It was the Korean brush and ink techniques in particular which are known to have had a significant impact on such Japanese painters as Ike no Taiga, Gion Nankai, and Sakaki Hyakusen.

=== Music and dance ===
In ancient times the imperial court of Japan imported all its music from abroad, though it was Korean music that reached Japan first. The first Korean music may have infiltrated Japan as early as the third century. Korean court music in ancient Japan was at first called "sankangaku" in Japanese, referring to music from all the states of the Korean peninsula, but it was later termed "komagaku" in reference specifically to the court music of the Korean kingdom of Guguryeo.

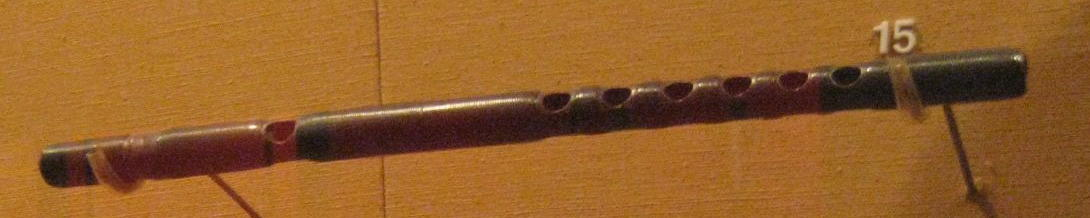
Komabue, a Korean flute used in early Japanese court music

Musicians from various Korean states often went to work in Japan. Mimaji, a Korean entertainer from Baekje, introduced Chinese dance and Chinese gigaku music to Japan in 612. By the time of the Nara period (710–794), every musician in Japan's imperial court was either Korean or Chinese. Korean musical instruments which became popular in Japan during this period include the flute known as the komabue, the zither known as the gayageum, and the harp known as the shiragikoto.

Though much has been written about Korean influence on early Japanese court music, Taeko Kusano has stated that Korean influence on Japanese folk music during the Edo period (1603–1868) represents a very important but neglected field of study. According to Taeko Kusano, each of the Joseon missions to Japan included about fifty Korean musicians and left their mark on Japanese folk music. Most notably, the "tojin procession", which was practiced in Nagasaki, the "tojin dance", which arose in modern-day Mie Prefecture, and the "karako dance", which exists in modern-day Okayama Prefecture, all have Korean roots and utilize Korean-based music.

=== Silk weaving ===
According to William Wayne Farris, citing a leading Japanese expert on ancient cloth, the production of high-quality silk twill took off in Japan from the fifth century onward as a result of new technology brought from Korea. Farris argues that Japan's Hata clan, who are believed to have been specialists in the art of silk weaving and silk tapestry, immigrated to Japan from the region of the Korean peninsula. By contrast, historian Cho-yun Hsu believes that the Hata clan were of Chinese descent.

=== Jewelry ===
Japan at first imported jewelry made of glass, gold, and silver from Korea, but in the fifth century the techniques of gold and silver metallurgy also entered Japan from Korea, possibly from the Korean states of Baekje and Gaya. Korean immigrants established important sites of jewelry manufacturing in Katsuragi, Gunma, and other places in Japan, allowing Japan to domestically produce its first gold and silver earrings, crowns, and beads.

=== Sculpture ===
Along with Buddhism, the art of Buddhist sculpture also spread to Japan from Korea. At first almost all Japanese Buddhist sculptures were imported from Korea, and these imports demonstrate an artistic style which would dominate Japanese sculpture during the Asuka period (538–710). In the years 577 and 588 the Korean state of Baekje dispatched to Japan expert statue sculptors.

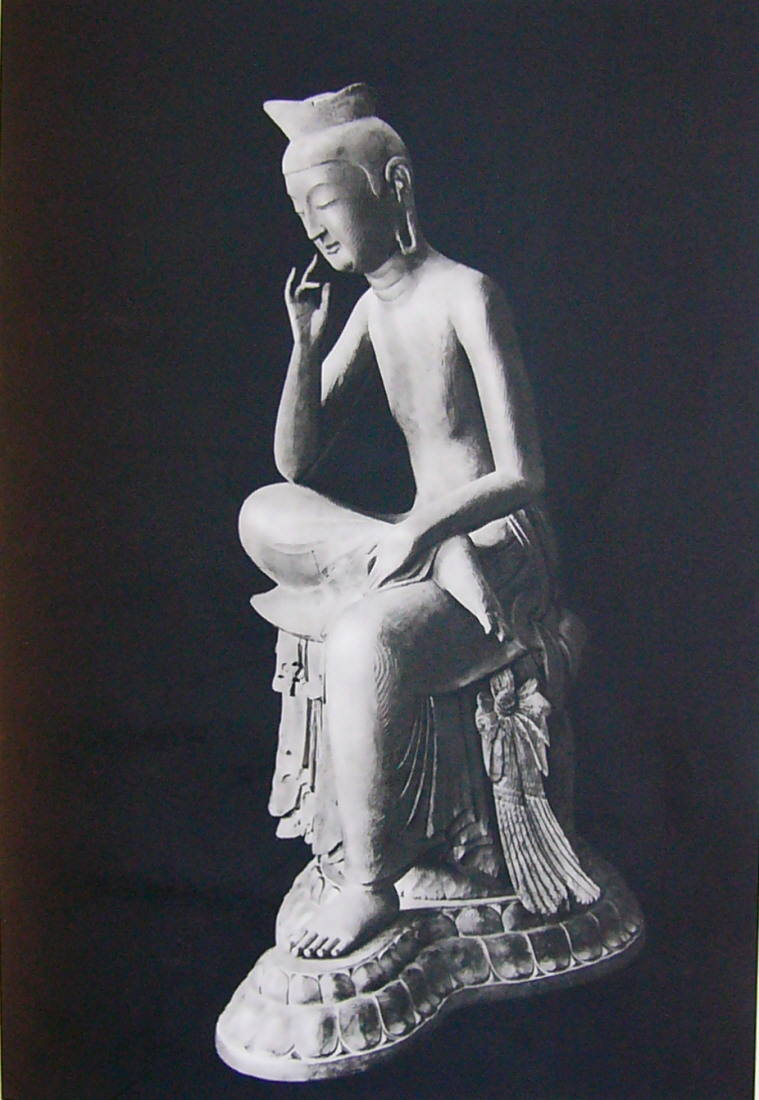
The "Crown-Coiffed Maitreya"

One of the most notable examples of Korean influence on Japanese sculpture is the Buddha statue in the Koryu-ji Temple, sometimes referred to as the "Crown-Coiffed Maitreya". This statue was directly copied from a Korean prototype around the seventh century. Likewise, the Great Buddha sculpture of Todai-ji Temple, as well as both the Baekje Kannon and the Guze Kannon sculptures of Japan's Horyu-ji Temple, are believed to have been sculpted by Koreans. The Guze Kannon was described as "the greatest perfect monument of Corean art" by Ernest Fenollosa.

=== Literature ===
Concerning literature, Roy Andrew Miller has stated that, "Japanese scholars have made important progress in identifying the seminal contributions of Korean immigrants, and of Korean literary culture as brought to Japan by the early Korean diaspora from the Old Korean kingdoms, to the formative stages of early Japanese poetic art". Susumu Nakanishi has argued that Okura was born in the Korean kingdom of Baekje to a high court doctor and came with his émigré family to Yamato at the age of 3 after the collapse of that kingdom. It has been noted that the Korean genre of hyangga (郷歌), of which only 25 examples survive from the Silla kingdom's Samdaemok (三代目), compiled in 888 CE, differ greatly in both form and theme from the Man'yōshū poems, with the single exception of some of Yamanoue no Okura's poetry which shares their Buddhist-philosophical thematics. Roy Andrew Miller, arguing that Okura's "Korean ethnicity" is an established fact though one disliked by the Japanese literary establishment, speaks of his "unique binational background and multilingual heritage".

=== Architecture ===
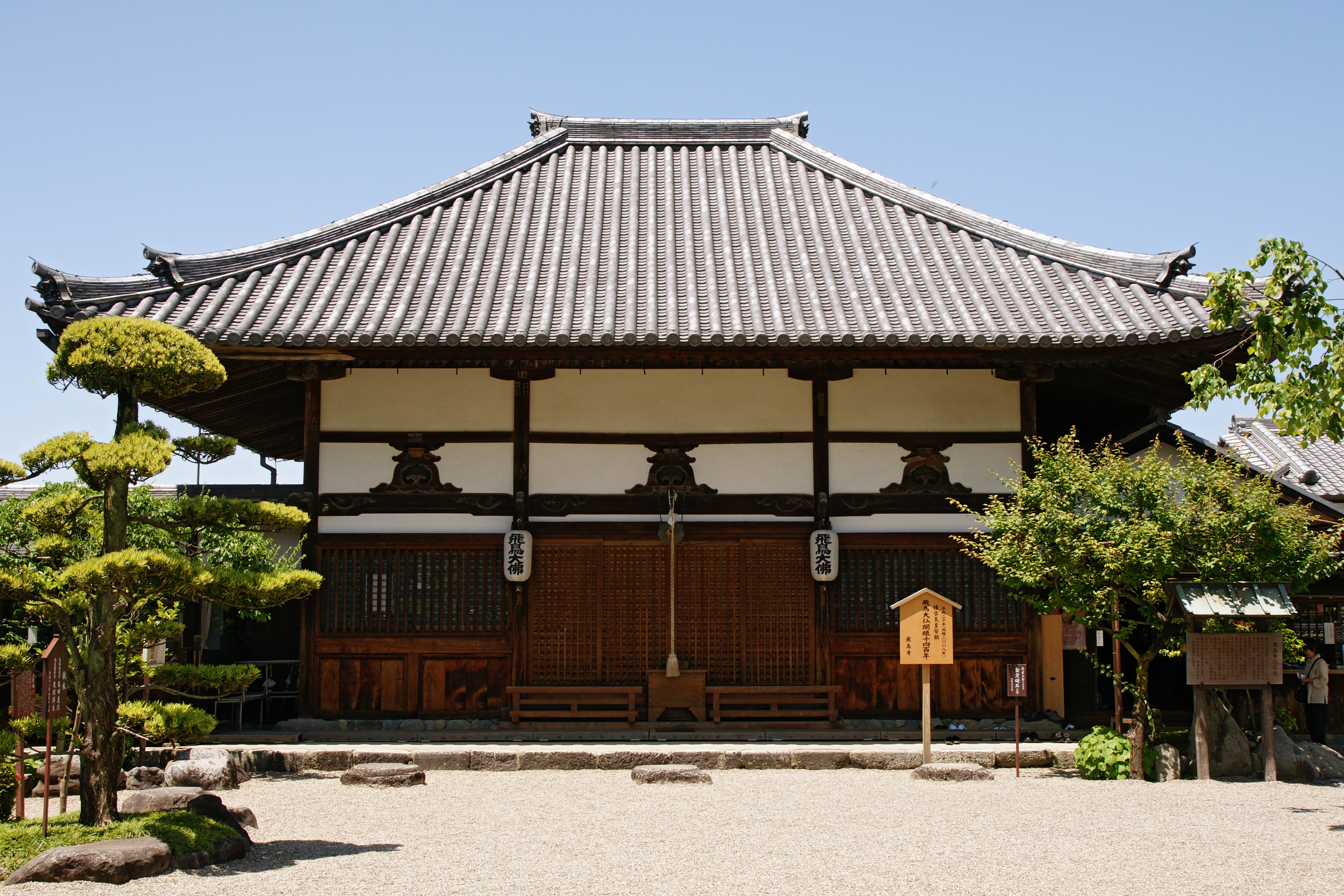
The main hall of Asuka Temple

William Wayne Farris has noted that "Architecture was one art that changed forever with the importation of Buddhism" from Korea. In 587 the Buddhist Soga clan took control of the Japanese government, and the very next year in 588 the kingdom of Baekje sent Japan two architects, one carpenter, four roof tilers, and one painter who were assigned the task of constructing Japan's first full-fledged Buddhist temple. This temple was Asuka Temple, completed in 596, and it was only the first of many such temples put together on the Baekje model. According to the historian Jonathan W. Best "virtually all of the numerous complete temples built in Japan between the last decade of the sixth and the middle of the seventh centuries" were designed off Korean models. Among such early Japanese temples designed and built with Korean aid are Shitennō-ji Temple and Hōryū-ji Temple.

Many of the temple bells were also of Korean design and origin. As late as the early eleventh century Korean bells were being delivered to many Japanese temples including Enjō-ji Temple. In the year 1921, eighteen Korean temple bells were designated as national treasures of Japan.

In addition to temples, starting from the sixth century advanced stonecutting technology entered Japan from Korea and as a result Japanese tomb construction also began to change in favor of Korean models. Around this time the horizontal tomb chambers prevalent in Baekje began to be constructed in Japan.

== Cultural transfers during Hideyoshi's invasions of Korea ==
The invasions of Korea by Japanese leader Toyotomi Hideyoshi between 1592 and 1598 were an extremely vigorous period of two-way cross-cultural transfer between Korea and Japan. Although Japan ultimately lost the war, Hideyoshi and his generals used the opportunity to loot valuable commodities from Korea and to kidnap skilled Korean craftsmen and take them back to Japan. Tokutomi Sohō summed up the conflict by saying that, "While neither Japan nor Choson gained any advantages from this war, Japan gained cultural benefits from the importation of moveable type printing, technological benefits from ceramics, and diplomatic benefits from its contact with Ming China."

=== Printing technology and books ===
Moveable type printing was invented in China in the eleventh century, and the technology was further refined in Korea. According to the historian Lawrence Marceau, during the late-sixteenth century, dramatic changes in Japanese printing technology were sparked by "two overseas sources". The first was the movable type printing-press established by the Jesuits in Kyushu in 1590. The second was the looting of Korean books and book printing technology after the invasion of Korea. Before 1590, Buddhist monasteries handled virtually all book printing in Japan, and, according to historian Donald Shively, books and moveable type transported from Korea "helped bring about the end of the monastic monopoly on printing." At the start of the invasion in 1592, Korean books and book printing technology were one of Japan's top priorities for looting, especially metal moveable type. One commander alone, Ukita Hideie, is said to have had 200,000 printing types and books removed from Korea's Gyeongbokgung Palace. In 1593, a Korean printing press with movable type was sent as a present for the Japanese Emperor Go-Yōzei. The emperor commanded that it be used to print an edition of the Confucian Classic of Filial Piety. Four years later in 1597, apparently due to difficulties encountered in casting metal, a Japanese version of the Korean printing press was built with wooden instead of metal type. In 1599, this press was used to print the first part of the Nihon Shoki. Eighty percent of Japan's book production was printed using moveable type between 1593 and 1625, but ultimately moveable type printing was supplanted by woodblock printing and was rarely used after 1650.

=== Ceramics ===
Prior to the invasion, Korea's high-quality ceramic pottery was prized in Japan, particularly the Korean teabowls used in the Japanese tea ceremony. Because of this, Japanese soldiers made great efforts to find skilled Korean potters and transfer them to Japan. For this reason, the Japanese invasion of Korea is sometimes referred to as the "Teabowl War" or the "Pottery War".

Hundreds of Korean potters were taken by the Japanese Army back to Japan with them, either being forcibly kidnapped or else being persuaded to leave. Once settled in Japan, the Korean potters were put to work making ceramics. Historian Andrew Maske has concluded that, "Without a doubt the single most important development in Japanese ceramics in the past five hundred years was the importation of Korean ceramic technology as a result of the invasions of Korea by the Japanese under Toyotomi Hideyoshi." Imari porcelain, Satsuma ware, Hagi ware, Karatsu ware, and Takatori ware were all pioneered by Koreans who came to Japan at this time.

=== Construction ===
Among the skilled craftsmen removed from Korea by Japanese forces were roof tilers, who would go on to make important contributions to tiling Japanese houses and castles. For example, one Korean tiler participated in the expansion of Kumamoto Castle. Furthermore, the Japanese daimyo Katō Kiyomasa had Nagoya Castle constructed using stonework techniques that he had learned during his time in Korea.

=== Neo-Confucianism ===
Kang Hang, a Korean neo-Confucian scholar, was kidnapped in Korea by Japanese soldiers and taken to Japan. He lived in Japan until the year 1600 during which time he formed an acquaintance with the scholar Fujiwara Seika and instructed him in neo-Confucian philosophy. Some historians believe that other Korean neo-Confucianists such as Yi Toe-gye also had a major impact on Japanese neo-Confucianism at this time. The idea was developed in particular by Abe Yoshio (阿部吉雄).

By contrast, Willem van Boot called this theory in question in his 1982 doctoral thesis and later works. Historian Jurgis Elisonas stated the following about the controversy:

"A similar great transformation in Japanese intellectual history has also been traced to Korean sources, for it has been asserted that the vogue for neo-Confucianism, a school of thought that would remain prominent throughout the Edo period (1600–1868), arose in Japan as a result of the Korean war, whether on account of the putative influence that the captive scholar-official Kang Hang exerted on Fujiwara Seika (1561–1619), the soi-disant discoverer of the true Confucian tradition for Japan, or because Korean books from looted libraries provided the new pattern and much new matter for a redefinition of Confucianism. This assertion, however is questionable and indeed has been rebutted convincingly in recent Western scholarship."

== Historiography ==
The interpretation of the history of early contacts, and the nature of the relations, between Japan and the states of the Korean peninsula has long been complicated by reciprocal nationalisms which skew interpretations. In the modern period, especially in the wake of Japan's annexation of Korea, a Tokugawa era theory developed which held that in antiquity Japan had ruled over Korea and its elites, and that the roots of the two people and polities were identical. This was called the "common ancestry theory" (naisen dōsoron:内鮮同祖論) and, based on early texts that spoke of Yamato invasions of the peninsula and the establishment of Mimana, was used to justify Japan's colonial seizure of Korea (seikanron:征韓論) as was evidence from excavations at the Lelang Commandery that ancient Korea had been long been a colonized country. In this perspective, while recognizing the great impact of Chinese civilization on both polities, the role of Korean peninsular peoples in the transmission of Sinic culture was underplayed and it was claimed that Japan had retained its indigenous uniqueness by consistently modifying the cultural elements flowing through Korea to Yamato. Korean nationalist historiography (minjok sahak) challenged Japanese versions of their history while often adopting the same prejudices, and asserted in turn, the country had national sovereignty in prehistoric times, and a racial and cultural superiority over other east Asian countries, reflecting the legacy of colonial Japan's own prejudices.

Recently, a growing consensus has been reached among historians on the importance of direct cultural transfers from Korea to Japan. However, the issue of Korean influence on Japanese culture continues to be a sensitive matter to discuss. The excavation of many of Japan's earliest imperial tombs, which might shed important light on the subject, remains prohibited by the Japanese government. By contrast, the admission by Emperor Akihito that the Imperial Family of Japan included Korean ancestors helped to improve bilateral Korea-Japan relations. Recently, the Kyoto Cultural Museum has stated that, "In seeking the source of Japan’s ancient culture many will look to China, but the quest will finally lead to Korea, where China's advanced culture was accepted and assimilated. In actuality, the people who crossed the sea were the people of the Korea Peninsula and their culture was the Korean culture."

As scholarship on pre-modern Korean contributions to Japanese culture has advanced, some academics have also begun studying reverse cultural flows from Japan to Korea during the same period of history. For example, historians note that, during Japan's Kofun period, Japanese-style bronze weapons and keyhole-shaped burial mounds spread to Korea.

== Contemporary cultural influence ==
Korea continues to exert cultural influence on Japan in some fields like food. Yakiniku is seen as having a Korean origin and became popular in the 20th century.

The Korean Wave of K-pop and K-dramas have influenced Japanese music and television. While traditionally Japan has been seen as more of an influence on Korean pop culture and as having laid the foundations of K-pop, the rise and success of K-pop has increasingly come back to influence J-pop in many ways such as choreography.

== See also ==
- Japanese influence on Korean culture
- Chinese influence on Korean culture
- Chinese influence on Japanese culture
- Culture of Japan
- Culture of Korea

== Bibliography ==
- Ahn Hwi-Joon, "Korean Influence on Japanese Ink Paintings of the Muromachi Period", Korea Journal, Winter 1997.
- Akiyama, Terukazu, Japanese Painting. New York: Rizzoli International Publications, 1977.
- Banham, Martin, The Cambridge Guide to World Theatre. New York: Cambridge University Press, 1988.
- Barnes, Gina, State Formation in Japan: Emergence of a 4th-Century Ruling Elite. New York: Routledge, 2007.
- Barnes, Gina, Archaeology of East Asia: The Rise of Civilization in China, Korea and Japan. Philadelphia: Oxbow Books, 2015.
- Batten, Bruce, Gateway to Japan: Hakata in War And Peace, 500–1300. Honolulu: University of Hawaii Press, 2006.
- Bentley, John R., A Descriptive Grammar of Early Old Japanese Prose. Boston: BRILL, 2001.
- Best, Jonathan W., "Paekche and the Incipiency of Buddhism in Japan", in Currents and Countercurrents: Korean Influences on the East Asian Buddhist Traditions, ed. Robert Buswell. Honolulu: University of Hawaii Press, 2005.
- Bowman, John, Columbia Chronologies of Asian History and Culture. New York: Columbia University Press, 2000.
- Buswell Jr., Robert, "Patterns of Influence in East Asian Buddhism: The Korean Case", in Currents and Countercurrents: Korean Influences on the East Asian Buddhist Traditions, ed. Robert Buswell. Honolulu: University of Hawaii Press, 2005.
- Chung, Edward, The Korean Neo-Confucianism of Yi T'oegye and Yi Yulgok. Albany: State University of New York Press, 1995.
- Cho, Insoo, "Painters as Envoys: Korean Inspiration in Eighteenth Century Japanese Nanga (Review)", Journal of Korean Studies, Fall 2007.
- Cho, Youngjoo, "The Small but Magnificent Counter-Piracy Operations of the republic of Korea", in Freedom of Navigation and Globalization, eds. Myron H. Nordquist, John Norton Moore, Robert Beckman, and Ronan Long. Leiden: Brill Nijhoff Publishers, 2014.
- Ch'on Kwan-u, "A New Interpretation of the Problems of Mimana (I)". Korea Journal, February 1974.
- Como, Michael, Shotoku: Ethnicity, Ritual, and Violence in the Japanese Buddhist Tradition. New York: Oxford University Press, 2008.
- Como, Michael, "Weaving and Binding: Immigrant Gods and Female Immortals in Ancient Japan". Honolulu: University of Hawai'i Press, 2009
- Ebrey, Patricia Buckley and Walthall, Anne, East Asia: A Cultural, Social, and Political History. Boston: Cengage Learning, 2013.
- Elisonas, Jurgis, "The Inseparable Trinity: Japan's Relations with China and Korea", in The Cambridge History of Japan Volume Four, ed. John Whitney Hall. New York: Cambridge University Press, 1991.
- Em, Henry, The Great Enterprise: Sovereignty and Historiography in Modern Korea, Part 2. London: Duke University Press, 2013.
- Farris, William Wayne (1998). Sacred Texts and Buried Treasures: Issues in the Historical Archaeology of Ancient Japan. Honolulu: University of Hawaii Press. ISBN 9780824820305.
- Farris, William Wayne, Japan to 1600: A Social and Economic History. Honolulu: University of Hawaii Press, 2009.
- Fenollosa, Ernest, Epochs of Chinese and Japanese Art Volume One. New York: Frederick A. Stokes, 1912.
- Frellesvig, Bjarke, A History of the Japanese Language. Cambridge: Cambridge University Press, 2010.
- Grayson, James H., Korea – A Religious History. New York: Routledge, 2013.
- Ha Woo Bong, "War and Cultural Exchange", in The East Asian War, 1592–1598, eds. James B. Lewis. New York: Routledge, 2015.
- Habu, Junko, Ancient Jomon of Japan. New York: Cambridge University Press, 2004.
- Hane, Mikiso, Premodern Japan: A Historical Survey. Boulder: Westview Press, 1991.
- Henshall, Kenneth G, A History of Japan: From Stone Age to Superpower. New York: St. Martin's Press, 1999.
- Hsu, Cho-yun, China: A New Cultural History. New York: Columbia University Press, 2012.
- Inoue Mitsusada, "The Century of Reform", in The Cambridge History of Japan Volume One, ed. Delmer M. Brown. New York: Cambridge University Press, 1993.
- Jansen, Marius, The Making of Modern Japan. Cambridge, Massachusetts: Belknap Press, 2000.
- Jung Hyoun, "Who Made Japan's National Treasure No. 1", in The Foreseen and the Unforeseen in Historical Relations Between Korea and Japan, eds. Northeast Asian History Foundation. Seoul: Northeast Asian History Foundation, 2009.
- Jungmann, Burglind, Painters as Envoys: Korean Inspiration in Eighteenth-Century Japanese Nanga. Princeton: Princeton University Press, 2004.
- Kamada Motokazu, "王権をめぐる戦い", in 大君による国土の統一, ed. Toshio Kishi. Tokyo: Chuo Koronsha, 1988.
- Kamata Shigeo, "The Transmission of Paekche Buddhism to Japan", in Introduction of Buddhism to Japan: New Cultural Patterns, eds. Lewis R. Lancaster and CS Yu. Berkeley, California: Asian Humanities Press, 1989.
- Kamstra, Jacques H., Encounter Or Syncretism: The Initial Growth of Japanese Buddhism. Leiden: Brill, 1967.
- Keene, Donald, World Within Walls: Japanese Literature of the Pre-Modern Era, 1600-1867 Volume One. New York: Holt, Rinehart and Winston, 1976.
- Keller, Agathe, and Volkov, Alexei, "Mathematics Education in Oriental Antiquity and Medieval Ages", in Handbook on the History of Mathematics Education, eds. Alexander Karp and Gert Schubring. New York: Springer, 2014.
- Kim, Eun Mee and Ryoo, Jiwon, "South Korean Culture Goes Global: K-Pop and the Korean Wave," Korean Social Science Journal, 2007.
- Kim, Jinwung, A History of Korea: From 'Land of the Morning Calm' to States in Conflict. Bloomington: Indiana University Press, 2012.
- Korean Buddhist Research Institute, The History and Culture of Buddhism in Korea. Seoul, Korea: Dongguk University Press, 1993.
- Kusano, Taeko, "Unknown Aspects of Korean Influence on Japanese Folk Music", Yearbook for Traditional Music, 1983.
- Lee, Hyoun-jun, "Korean Influence on Japanese Culture (1)", Korean Frontier, August 1970.
- Lee, Hyoun-jun, "Korean Influence on Japanese Culture (2)", Korean Frontier, September 1970.
- Lee, Hyoun-jun, "Korean Influence on Japanese Culture (3)", Korean Frontier, October 1970.
- Lee, Ki-Moon, and Ramsey, S. Robert, A History of the Korean Language. Cambridge: Cambridge University Press, 2011.
- Levy, Ian Hideo, Hitomaro and the Birth of Japanese Lyricism. Princeton, New Jersey: Princeton University Press, 1984.
- Lewis, James B., Frontier Contact Between Choson Korea and Tokugawa Japan. New York: Routledge, 2005.
- Lu, Gwei-djen, and Needham, Joseph, Celestial Lancets: A History and Rationale of Acupuncture and Moxa. New York: Cambridge University Press, 1980.
- Malm, William P., Traditional Japanese Music and Musical Instruments. New York: Kodansha International, 1959.
- Marceau, Lawrence, "Cultural Developments in Tokugawa Japan", in A Companion to Japanese History, ed. William M. Tsutsui. Malden, Massachusetts: Blackwell Publishing, 2007.
- Maske, Andrew, "The Continental Origins of Takatori Ware: The Introduction of Korean Potters and Technology to Japan Through the Invasions of 1592–1598", Transactions of the Asiatic Society of Japan, 1994.
- McBride, Richard D., Domesticating the Dharma: Buddhist Cults and the Hwaom Synthesis in Silla Korea. Honolulu: University of Hawaii Press, 2008.
- McCallum, Donald, "Korean Influence on Early Japanese Buddhist Sculpture," Korean Culture, March 1982.
- McCallum, Donald, The Four Great Temples: Buddhist Archaeology, Architecture, and Icons of Seventh-Century Japan. Honolulu: University of Hawaii Press, 2009.
- Miller, Roy Andrew, "Uri Famëba", in Wasser-Spuren: Festschrift für Wolfram Naumann zum 65. Geburtstag, ed. Stanca Scholz-Cionca. Otto Harrassowitz Verlag, 1997.
- Miller, Roy Andrew, "Plus Ça Change...", The Journal of Asian Studies, August 1980.
- Miyake, Marc Hideo, Old Japanese: A Phonetic Reconstruction. New York: RoutledgeCurzon, 2003.
- Mori Koichi, "継体王朝と百済", in 古代の河内と百済, ed. Hirakata Rekishi Forum Jikko Iinkai. Hirakata: Daikoro Co., 2001.
- Mori Ikuo, "Korean Influence and Japanese Innovation in Tiles of the Asuka-Hakuho Period", in Transmitting the Forms of Divinity: Early Buddhist Art from Korea and Japan, eds. Washizuka Hiromitsu, et al. New York: Japan Society, 2003.
- Nakamura, Shintaro, 日本と中国の二千年. Tokyo: Toho Shuppan, 1981.
- Nakazono, Satoru, "The Role of Long-Distance Interaction in the Socio-Cultural Change in Yayoi Period, Japan ", in Coexistence and Cultural Transformation in East Asia, eds. Naoko Matsumoto, et al. Walnut Creek, California: Left Coast Press, 2011.
- Needham, Joseph, and Tsien Tsuen-hsuin, Science and Civilisation in China: Volume Five, Chemistry and Chemical Technology, Part 1, Paper and Printing. Cambridge: Cambridge University Press, 1985.
- Needham, Joseph, and Wang Ling, Science and Civilisation in China: Volume Four, Physics and Physical Technology, Part Two, Mechanical Engineering. Cambridge: Cambridge University Press, 1965.
- Pai, Hyung Il, Constructing "Korean" Origins: A Critical Review of Archaeology, Historiography, and Racial Myth in Korean State-formation Theories. Cambridge: Harvard University Asia Center, 2000.
- Pak, Song-nae, Science and Technology in Korean History: Excursions, Innovations, and Issues. Fremont, California: Jain, 2005.
- Portal, Jane, Korea: Art and Archaeology. New York: Thames & Hudson, 2000.
- Pratt, Keith and Rutt, Richard, Korea: A Historical and Cultural Dictionary. Richmond, Surrey: Curzon Press, 1999.
- Reischauer, Edwin O., Ennin's travels in Tʻang China. Ronald Press Company, 1955
- Rhee, Song-Nai, Aikens, C. Melvin, Choi, Sung-Rak, and Ro, Hyuk-Jin, "Korean Contributions to Agriculture, Technology, and State Formation in Japan". Asian Perspectives, Fall 2007. JSTOR 42928724
- Rosner, Erhard, Medizingeschichte Japans. Leiden: BRILL, 1988.
- Sansom, George. A History of Japan Volume One. Stanford: Stanford University Press, 1958.
- Sato, Seizaburo, "Response to the West: The Korean and Japanese Patterns", in Japan: A Comparative View, ed. Albert M Craig. Princeton: Princeton University Press, 1979.
- Seeley, Christopher, A History of Writing in Japan. New York: EJ Brill, 1991.
- Shin, Gi-Wook, Ethnic Nationalism in Korea: Genealogy, Politics, and Legacy. Stanford: Stanford University Press, 2006.
- Shively, Donald, "Popular Culture", in The Cambridge History of Japan Volume Four, ed. John Whitney Hall. New York: Cambridge University Press, 1991.
- Tokyo National Museum, Pageant of Japanese Art: Textiles and Lacquer. Tokyo: Toto Bunka, 1952.
- Totman, Conrad, Japan: An Environmental History. London: IB Tauris, 2014.
- Tucker, Mary Evelyn, Moral and Spiritual Cultivation in Japanese Neo-Confucianism: The Life and Thought of Kaibara Ekken (1630–1714). Albany: State University of New York Press, 1989.
- von Ragué, Beatrix, A History of Japanese Lacquerwork. Toronto: University of Toronto Press, 1976.
- Wang Zhenping, Ambassadors from the Islands of Immortals: China-Japan Relations in the Han-Tang period. University of Hawaii Press, 2005.
- Williams, Yoko, Tsumi - Offence and Retribution in Early Japan. New York: RoutledgeCurzon, 2003.
- Xu, Stella, Reconstructing Ancient Korean History: The Formation of Korean-ness in the Shadow of History. Lanham: Lexington Books, 2016.
