= Gion Nankai =

Sections from a Landscape Scroll
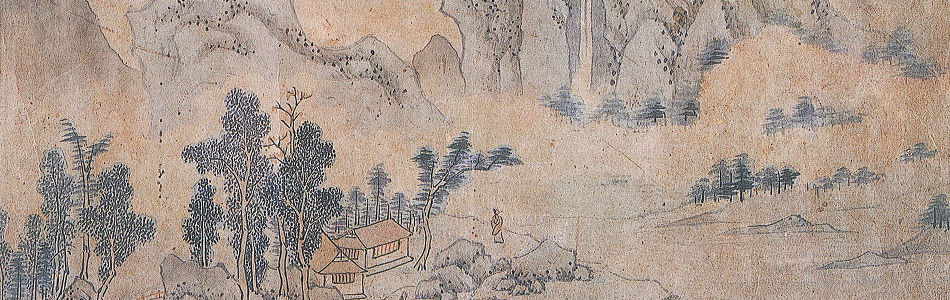
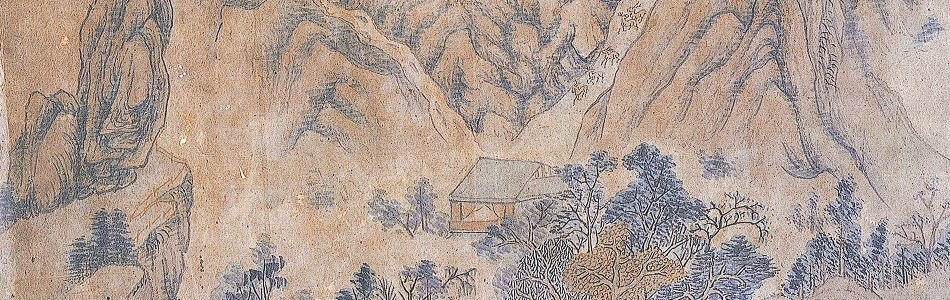

Gion Nankai, originally Gion Yu (祇園 南海; 1676, Edo - 26 October 1751, Edo) was a Japanese confucianist, author and painter in the nanga style. His other art names included Hōrai (蓬莱), Kanraitei (観雷亭), Kikyo (箕踞), Shōun (湘雲), Tekkan Dōjin (鉄冠道人) and Tekkanjin (鉄冠人).

== Life and work ==
He was the eldest son of Gion Jun’an, a doctor who served the Kishū Domain of the Tokugawa clan. At the age of thirteen, he began to receive instruction from the Confucianist Kinoshita Jun'an and became attached to the group of ten disciples that included Arai Hakuseki and Muro Kyūsō. He became distinguished as a writer of poetry and prose and established himself as a teacher of Confucianism in 1713.

At the age of twenty-four, he was expelled from his teaching position for misconduct, for reasons now unknown. Ten years later, he was pardoned and returned to a teaching post in Wakayama. The following year, he was the head of a mission to Korea, for which he received a credit of 200 Koku. He was then entrusted with managing one of the newly founded Han schools.

At this time, he began to study the art of the Yuan and Ming dynasties and incorporate elements from them into his works. He also studied the Manual of the Mustard Seed Garden. As his most notable influences, he claimed Zhao Mengfu for calligraphy and Tang Yin for painting. He also admired Yi Fujiu.

He was one of the pioneers of nanga (literati painting); passing it along to his students, Yanagisawa Kien and Ike no Taiga. He mostly painted birds and flowers, together with a few landscapes, using a minimal variety of colors. Many of his works are in the Tokyo National Museum. He also wrote a collection of essays on Chinese poetry.

== Sources ==
- Tazawa, Yutaka: "Gion Nankai". In: Biographical Dictionary of Japanese Art. Kodansha International, 1981. ISBN 0-87011-488-3.
- Laurance P. Roberts: "Nankai". In: A Dictionary of Japanese Artists. Weatherhill, 1976. ISBN 0-8348-0113-2.
