= Yuri (poet) =

- Born: 1694
- Died: 1764 (aged 69–70)
- Occupation: Poet, calligrapher
- Children: Ike Gyokuran

Yuri (Japanese: 百合; 1694–1764), also known as Gion Yuriko or Gion Yuri, was a Japanese poet and calligrapher. She was the adopted daughter of the poet and calligrapher Kaji and the mother of the painter Ike Gyokuran.

== Life and career ==
Most of what is known about Yuri's life is from a short biographical sketch written by the philosopher and historian Rai San'yō. His source of information was the monk and painter Yamaoka Geppō, who studied under the painter Ike no Taiga, the husband of Ike Gyokuran and son-in-law of Yuri.

Yuri's origins are unknown; she may have been from Edo and had the family name Kimura. She was adopted by Kaji, who was the proprietor of a teahouse in the Gion district of Kyoto called Matsuya. Yuri later ran the teahouse herself and, also like her mother, composed waka poetry and wrote them at the request of customers. Among the luminaries who frequented the teahouse were the poet and noble Reizei Tamemura (1712-1774), who served as an artistic mentor for Yuri.

Because of their ephemeral nature, few examples of her calligraphy are extant. According to Grove Art Online, "both her poetry and her relaxed and fluid style of calligraphy reveal her strong personality". Rai San'yō had seen an example and wrote that "the writing is very vigorous and forceful, like the woman herself."

Yuri had a lover who was from the noble Tokuyama family. They had a daughter named Machi (町), who later took the art name Ike Gyokuran. According to Rai San'yō, their relationship lasted a decade until her lover was called to take his place in the family after the death of his elder brother, and Yuri insisted he abandon her to avoid loss of honor or station.

159 of her poems were published in 1727 as Sayuri ba ("Leaves from a small lily").
