= Kinoshita Jun'an =

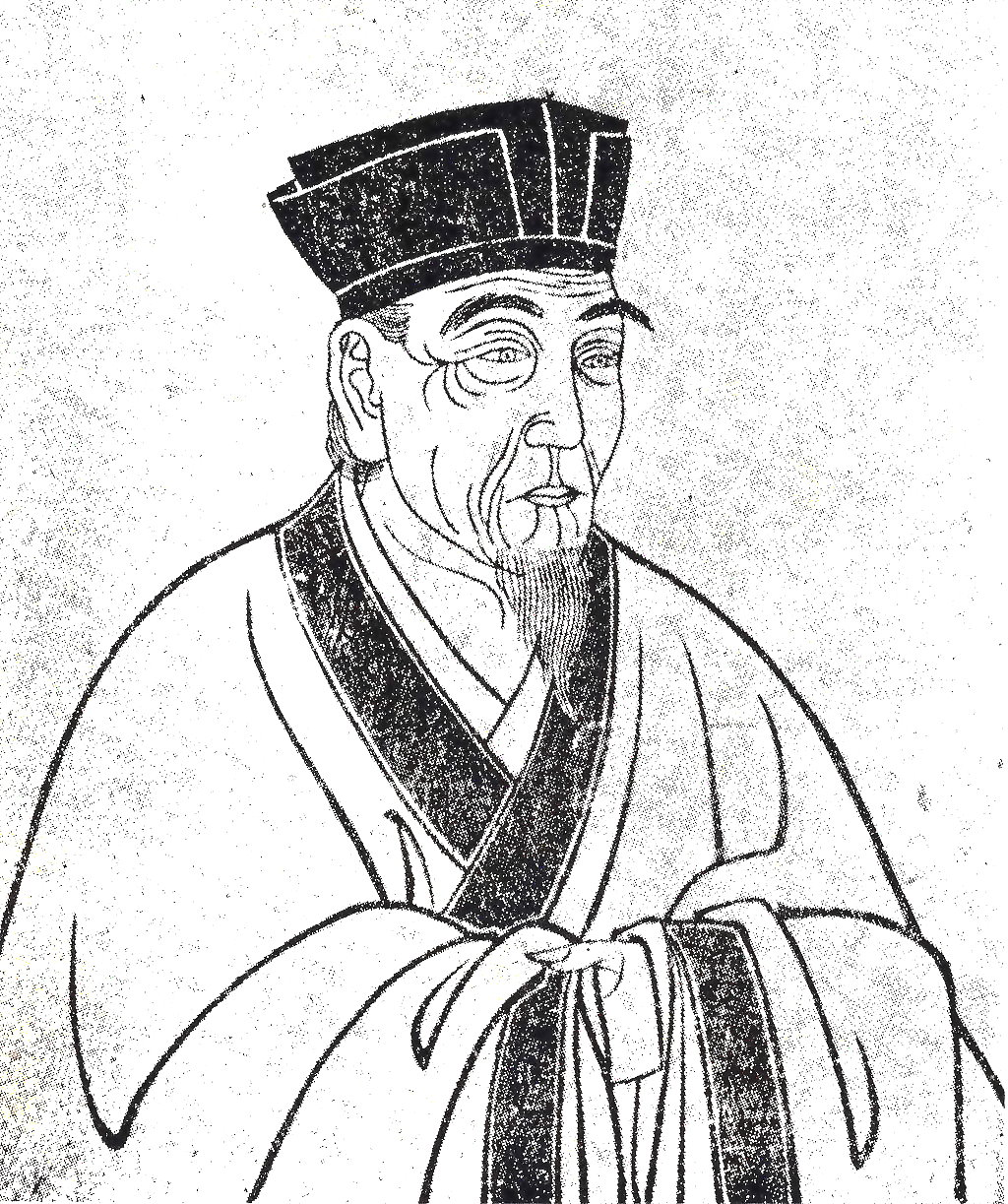
- Born: July 22, 1621; Kyoto, Japan
- Died: January 23, 1699 (aged 77); Edo
- Occupations: Confucian scholar, Philosopher

Kinoshita Jun'an (木下 順庵; 22 July 1621 – 23 January 1699) was a Japanese philosopher and Confucian scholar of the early Edo period, in the Neo-Confucian tradition of Zhu Xi.

== Biography ==
Born in Kyoto as the second of five brothers, Kinoshita was a child prodigy, and studied under Matsunaga Sekigo.

In 1682, the fifth Tokugawa shōgun, Tokugawa Tsunayoshi, appointed him tutor to the court.

A famed educator, Kinoshita's students include Arai Hakuseki (who became advisor to the sixth Tokugawa shōgun, Tokugawa Ienobu), Amenomori Hōshū, Gion Nankai, Muro Kyūsō, Nishiyama Juntai, and Sakakibara Kōshū.
