= Kotaku (disambiguation) =

Kotaku is a video game website and blog.

Kotaku could also refer to:

- Hosoi Kōtaku (Japanese: 細井広沢; 1658–1736), Confucian scholar
- Kotaku (Japanese: こたく), another name for Shinsenkyo, a fictional island in Hell's Paradise: Jigokuraku
