= Kaji (poet) =

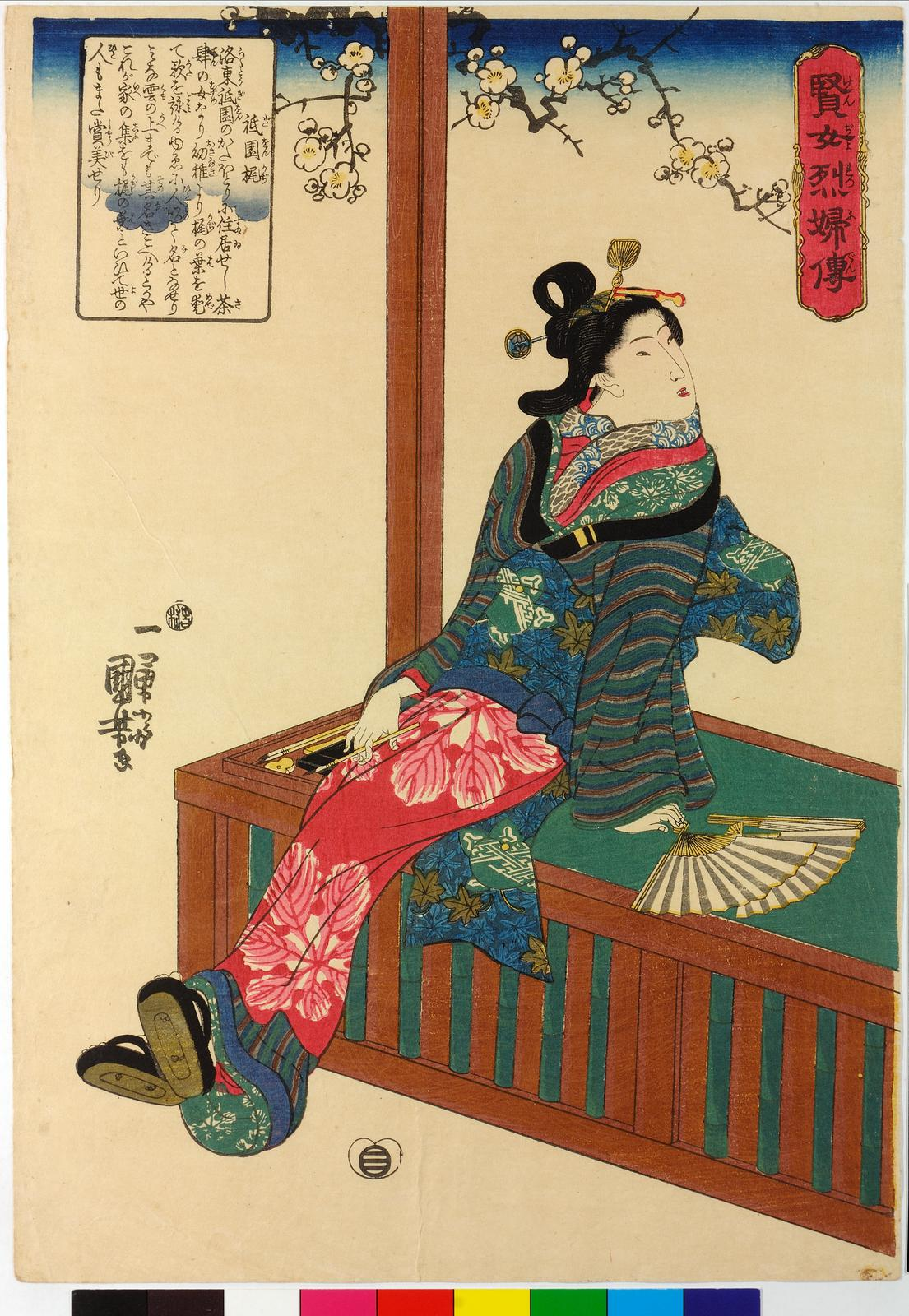
- Occupation: Poet, calligrapher

Kaji (祇園梶 or 祇園梶子, fl. early 18th century), also known as Kajijo, Gion Kaji, Gion Kajiko, and Kaji of Gion, was a Japanese waka poet and calligrapher. She was one of the most famous and celebrated poets of 18th century Japan. She was the adopted mother of the poet and calligrapher Yuri and the grandmother of the painter Ike Gyokuran.

== Life and career ==
The details of Kaji's early life are unknown, but some have speculated she was the daughter of a poet from Kyoto. Her talent as a waka poet was recognized as early as her teenage years.

In the early 18th century, Kaji opened a teahouse called the Matsuya in the Gion district of Kyoto, near a Shinto shrine. At the request of customers, she would compose poems on shikishi and tanzaku, small pieces of paper or bamboo. Among the teahouse's notable guests were the poets Nakanoin Michishige (1631-1710) and Reizei Tamemura (1712-1774).

Because of their ephemeral nature, few examples of Kaji's calligraphy are extant. Grove Art Online describes her calligraphy as "remarkable for its boldness, energy and flair, effects created by dramatic variations in the thickness of the line", while Stephen Addiss writes that it displays "a strong and lively brushwork that matches her personality".

In 1707, the poet Miyazaki Ameishi (d. 1758) collected 120 of Kaji's waka and published them in a three volume work called Kaji no ha (梶の葉; "Paper mulberry leaves"), illustrated by Miyazaki Yūzen.

Other Japanese poets have referred to her and her work in their poetry, including Takarai Kikaku, Yosa Buson, and Yosano Akikio. She and her teahouse were depicted by artists like Mikuma Katen (1730–1794) and Utagawa Kuniyoshi. Kuniyoshi included her in his series of prints called Kenjo Reppuden ("Stories of Wise Women and Faithful Wives"). She is one of the many figures celebrated in the annual Jidai Matsuri festival in Kyoto.
