= Hosoi Kōtaku =

- 細井広沢
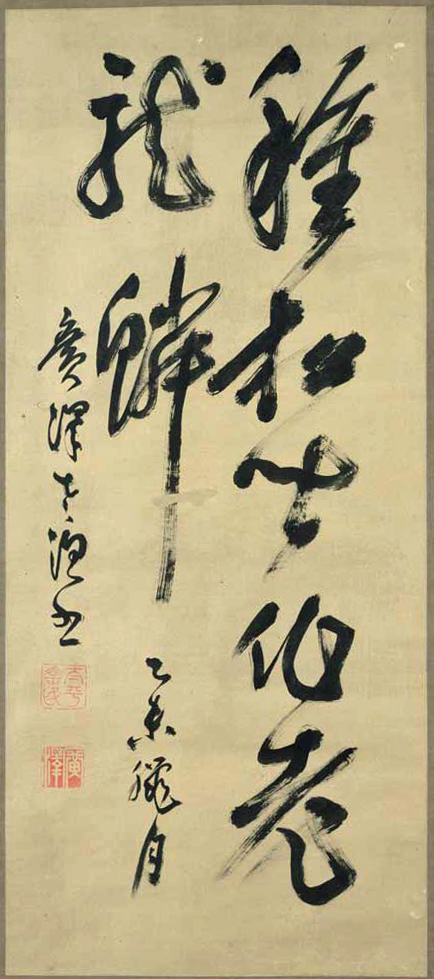
- Calligraphy by Hosoi Kōtaku
- Born: May 13, 1811; Kakegawa, Tōtōmi Province, Japan
- Died: February 4, 1736 (aged 77); Edo, Japan

Hosoi Kōtaku (細井広沢, November 3, 1658 - February 4, 1736) was a Confucian scholar, calligrapher and seal carver in early Edo period Japan. He went by many pseudonyms during his career, including the pen-names of Jirō Tayū, Hirosawa, Tamagawa, Shiyosai, Shōrin-an, and Kisshō-dō. His calligraphy was highly praised in the pre-war period.

== Biography ==
Hosoi was born in Kakegawa, Tōtōmi Province as the second son of a samurai in the service of Matsudaira Nobuyuki. His father was subsequently transferred with his lord to Akashi Domain in Harima province, but Hosoi remained at the domain's Edo residence for studies. He was a disciple of the Cheng–Zhu school under Confucian scholar Sakai Seikan from 1672, and the calligrapher Kitajima Tetsuzan from 1677. He also studied military science, waka poetry, astronomy, land surveying and mathematics, and with his reputation for diverse knowledge was able to obtain a position with a kokudaka of 200 koku under Yanagisawa Yoshiyasu, the senior advisor to Shogun Tokugawa Tsunayoshi. He also learned Japanese swordsmanship in the dōjō of Horiuchi Masaharu where he became close friends with Horibe Takatsune, a samurai from Akō Domain.

During the Akō incident of 1701, in which the 47 former samurai of the dissolved Akō Domain fulfilled their vendetta against Kira Yoshinaka, Hosoi assisted the attackers by copyediting the proclamation made by the Akō ronin when they stormed Kira's residence. He was also entrusted with the compilation of Horibe's personal diary, in which it is apparent that he cooperated closely with the Akō ronin in planning the attack.

However, in 1702, he was expelled by Yanagisawa under pressure from Matsudaira Terusada, the daimyō of Takasaki Domain. Hosoi had successfully argued a legal dispute between a friend and Matsudaira Terusada, and the outraged Matsudaira pressured Yanagisawa to expel Hosoi. Although Yanagisawa succumbed to this political pressure, he continue to support Hosoi with an annual stipend of 50 ryō and continued to consult with him unofficially. Around 15 years later, in the Kyōhō era (1716-1736), he received an official post to assist in the editing of the shogunate's legislation.

Hosoi wrote many books on diverse topics during his career, but is especially noted for establishing a distinctive style of calligraphy and of seal carving. His many disciples included the painter Yanagisawa Kien. He died on February 4, 1736, and his grave is at the temple of Mangan-ji in Setagaya, Tokyo. His grave was designated a National Historic Site in 1949.
