= Yi Hai =

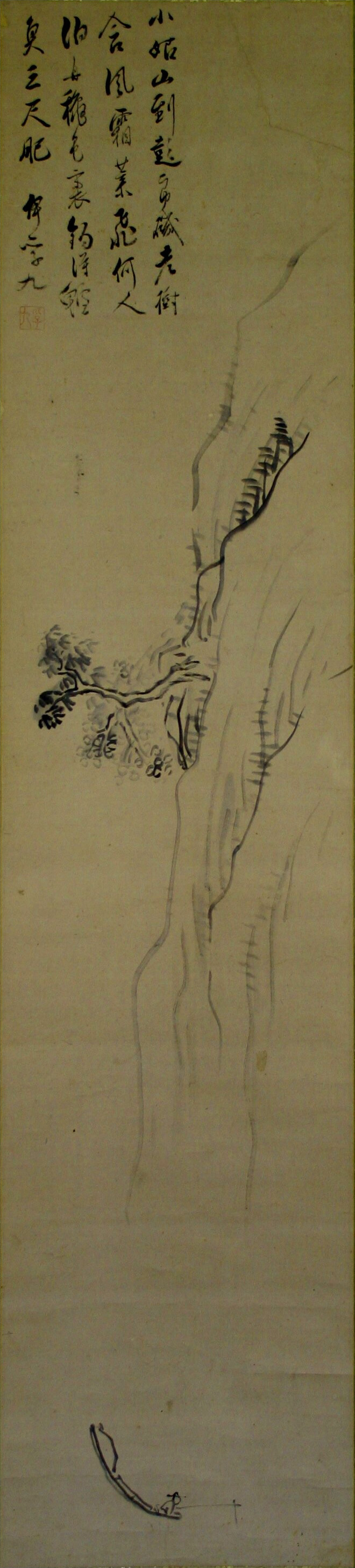
Nantoyōsō Collection, Japan

Yi Hai (Chinese: 伊海; 1698 – c. 1747), courtesy name Fujiu (桴鳩) and known as I Fukyū in Japanese, was a Chinese painter and merchant who frequented the Japanese trading port of Nagasaki. He is said to have been a captain of a junk trading ship that plied between Ningbo and Nagasaki from 1726 to 1746.

Yi Hai is identified in the Encyclopedia of Chinese Artists as a native of Wuxing, Zhejiang. Trade in Japan at this time was restricted to the port of Nagasaki and Chinese merchants carried on their business in the Chinese Factory or Tojinyashiki (唐人屋敷). Van Gulick in his Chinese Pictorial Art suggested that although Yi Hai produced some "striking ink-landscapes" he also engaged in "some mild forms of piracy." Yi Hai's renown in Japan was to such an extent he was known as one of the "Four Great Masters From Abroad." In 1803, his works were printed with those of the master Ike-no-Taiga in Album of Paintings by Yi Fujiu and Ike Taiga. Although his works could be seen just as cold imitations of Chinese literati works, Yi Fujiu's style has no precedent in Japan, because it was different from the familiar ink traditions of Muromachi collections. His landscapes eventually reflect a mixed style, which made reference to several Chinese literati artists.
