= Sen Sōshitsu XV =

Japanese tea master (1923–2025)

Sen Genshitsu XV
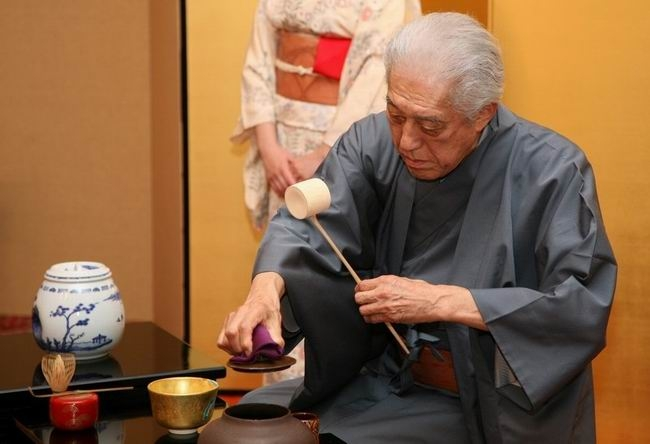
- Sen Sōshitsu XV in 2007

Iemoto of Urasenke
- In office 1964–2002
- Preceded by: Sen Sōshitsu XIV
- Succeeded by: Sen Sōshitsu XVI

Personal details
- Born: Masaoki Sen; 19 April 1923 Kyoto, Japan
- Died: 14 August 2025 (aged 102) Kyoto, Japan
- Spouse: Tomiko
- Children: 2
- Relatives: Masako Sen (daughter-in-law)

Sen Sōshitsu XV (十五代千宗室, jū go dai sen sōshitsu; 19 April 1923 – 14 August 2025) was the 15th-generation Grand Master (iemoto) of Urasenke, which is one of the most widely known schools of Japanese tea, and served in official capacity from 1964 to 2002. In 1949, he received the Zen title Hōunsai (鵬雲斎). Following his retirement, he adopted the name Sen Genshitsu (玄室), with the honorary title Daisōshō, in order to distinguish him from his son and successor, Sen Sōshitsu XVI. For over seven decades, Sen Genshitsu traveled across the world in order to promote the ethos of "Peacefulness through a Bowl of Tea".

== Early life ==
Sen Genshitsu was born in Kyoto on 19 April 1923, the first son of the 14th-generation Urasenke iemoto (Sen Sōshitsu XIV, Mugensai Sekisō Sōshitsu (Tantansai), 1893–1964) and his wife, (née Itō) Kayoko. Prior to his birth, Mugensai and Kayoko were already the parents of two daughters, Yaeko and Yoshiko; the birth of their first son, who would eventually become Mugensai's successor, caused much jubilation. Later, Mugensai and Kayoko had two more sons, Yoshiharu and Mitsuhiko.

At birth, he was given the name Masaoki (政興) by his grandfather, the 13th-generation Urasenke iemoto (Sen Sōshitsu XIII, Ennōsai Tetchū Sōshitsu, 1872–1924). During World War II, Sen Masaoki served in the Japanese Navy airforce division while he was a student at Doshisha University, and was assigned to be a kamikaze pilot, but was unable to fly due to a deliberate order to prevent an old dynasty from dying out. He later completed his education at Doshisha University, graduating from the faculty of economics. He took Buddhist vows under Gotō Zuigan, the chief abbot of Daitoku-ji temple, and in 1949, received the title Hōunsai.

== Career and honors ==
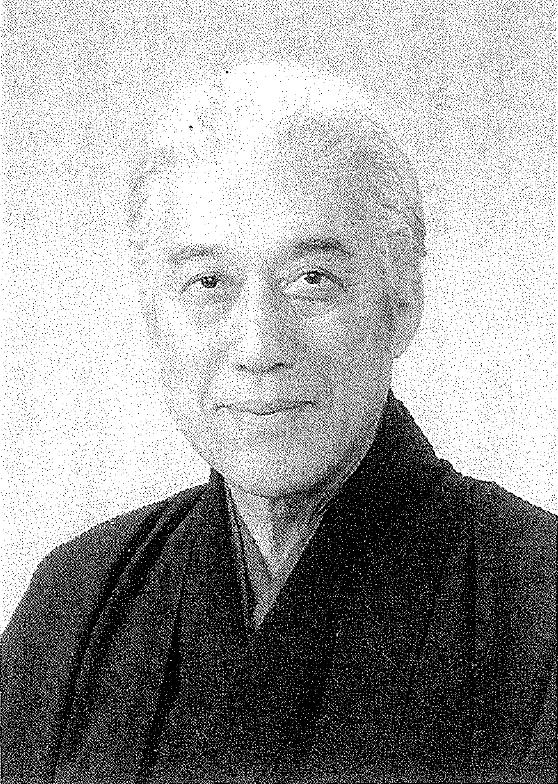
1995

In 1950, confirmed as heir apparent, he began his many travels abroad to spread his ideas, starting in the United States, where he began his association with the University of Hawaiʻi. In 1953, he became president of the non-profit Urasenke membership organization, Tankokai. Upon his father's death in 1964, he officially succeeded as the 15th-generation Urasenke iemoto. In the following decades, he made many contributions to the international academic study of the history and culture of tea, and was awarded a Ph.D. from Nankai University in 1991, and a Litt.D. from Chung-Ang University in 2008. In 1976, Seton Hall University awarded him an honorary Doctor of Fine Arts.

Among positions outside of Urasenke, he headed the Consulate of Peru in Kyoto as honorary consul until his death. He was honorary consul of Portugal in Kyoto from 1969 to 1982, and the honorary consul-general of Italy in Kyoto from 1982 to 1983. He served as Rotary International director from 1988 to 1990, and as a Rotary Foundation trustee from 1998 to 2002. He was appointed by Japan's Ministry of Foreign Affairs as Japan-U.N. Goodwill Ambassador in 2005, as well as chairman of the Rotary Japan Foundation, president of the United Nations Association of Japan, president of the Kyoto City International Foundation, director of the Kyoto Municipal General Center for Lifelong Learning, and president of the Japan Equestrian Federation. In March 2012, he was designated as UNESCO Goodwill Ambassador by the director-general of UNESCO. In April 2017, he was appointed an advisor to the Minister for Foreign Affairs of Japan.

In 1997, he was awarded the Order of Culture by the Emperor of Japan, Akihito, the first in the chadō world to receive such an honor. In 2020, the French government awarded him the Legion of Honour, with the degree of Commander.

== Legacy ==
Sen endowed a distinguished chair in Japanese history and culture in the Department of History at the University of Hawaiʻi. H. Paul Varley was the first holder of the position, followed by William Wayne Farris; as of 2026, Nancy Stalker is the incumbent Sen Sōshitsu XV Distinguished Chair of Traditional Japanese History and Culture.

== Personal life and death ==
His wife was Tomiko (1930–1999). In December 2002, his eldest son, Zabōsai (born 7 June 1956), succeeded him as the 16th-generation head of Urasenke, and inherited the name Sōshitsu. With that, Sen Sōshitsu XV discontinued his own use of the Sōshitsu name, taking on the name Sen Genshitsu, and the honorary title Daisōshō, signifying his position as a former Grand Master.

His son Sōshitsu Sen XVI is married to Masako Sen (née Princess Masako of Mikasa), granddaughter of Emperor Taishō.

On 19 April 2023, Sen Genshitsu marked his one hundredth birthday.

Sen Genshitsu died in Kyoto after experiencing respiratory problems on 14 August 2025, at the age of 102. He had been hospitalized since May following a fall.
