= Mangan-ji (Setagaya) =

Buddhist temple located in Setagaya, Tokyo, Japan

- 満願寺
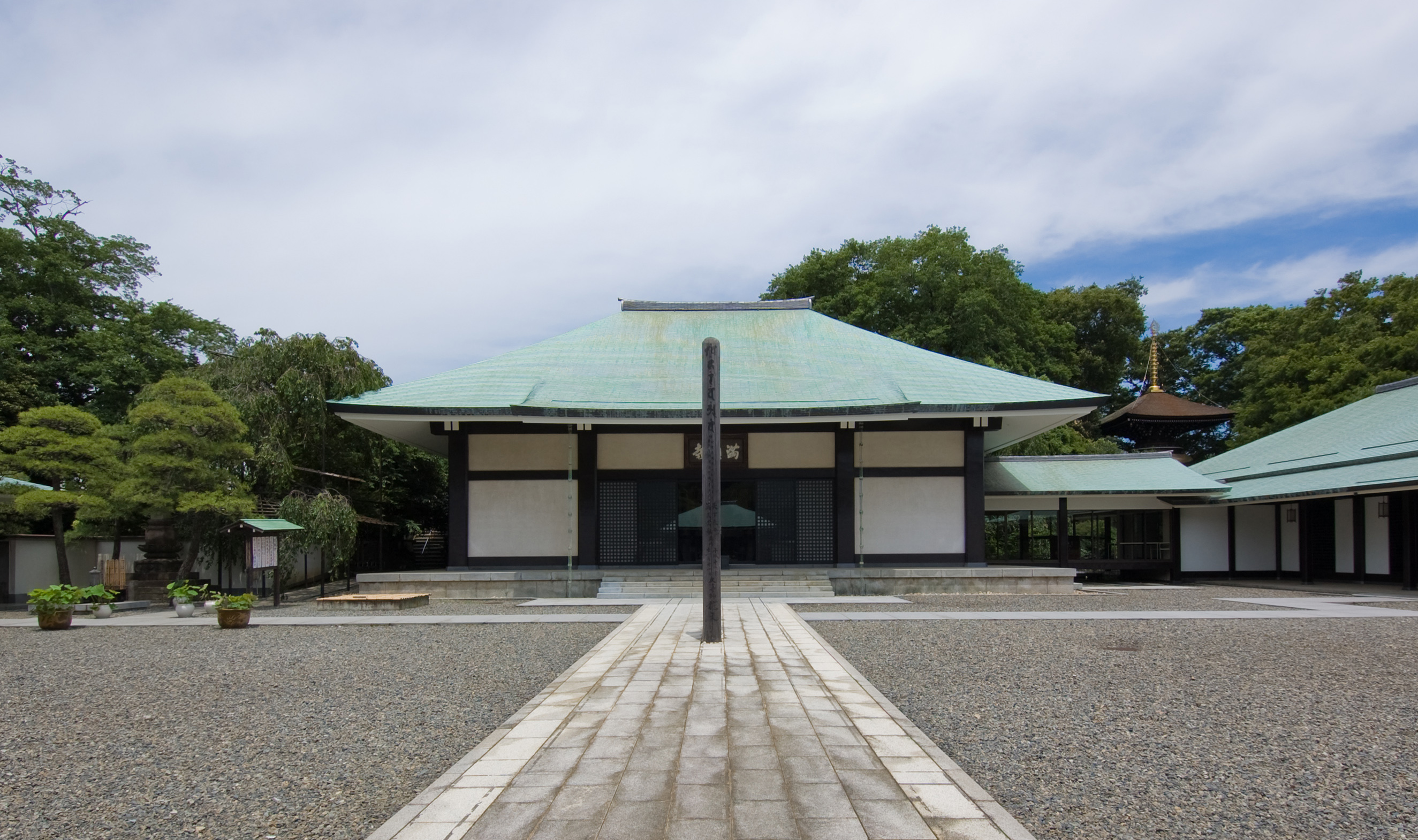
- Mangan-ji Hondō

- Location within Tokyo Location within Japan

Religion
- Affiliation: Buddhism
- Deity: Dainichi Nyōrai
- Rite: Shingon-shū Chisan-ha
- Status: active

Location
- Location: 3-15-1 Todoroki, Setagaya City, Tokyo 158-0082
- Country: Japan
- Interactive map of Mangan-ji
- Coordinates: 35°36′36.5″N 139°38′59.1″E

Website
- Official website

Mangan-ji (満願寺) is a Buddhist temple located in the Setagaya Ward of Tokyo, Japan. The temple is also called Todoroki Fudō (等々力不動), after a famous image in one of its chapels. The temple is noteworthy as being the 17th on the Bandō Sanjūroku Fudōson Reijō pilgrimage route of 36 temples in the Kantō region dedicated to Fudō Myōō. The temple currently belongs to the Shingon-shū Chisan-ha school of Japanese Buddhism.

== Overview ==
Mangan-ji claims to have been founded in the Heian period, but subsequently fell into disrepair. It was revived in 1470 as a chapel for one of Setagaya Castle's outlier fortifications, Todoroki Castle. It developed into a seminary temple. During the Tenbun era, (1532 to 1555), the temple was located from Todoroki to its present location. During the Edo period it was awarded a stipend of 13 koku by the Tokugawa shogunate for its upkeep. Around this time, the mountain name was changed from Iozan (医王山) to Chikozan (致航山) and its primary object of worship was changed from Yakushi Nyōrai to Dainichi Nyōrai; however, the temple was more famous as spot for popular worship for its statue of Jizo Bosatsu, which in popular imagination was thought to be able to grant a single wish to any worshipper.

The temple has the grave of Hosoi Kōtaku (1658-1736) a noted Edo period Confucian scholar, calligrapher and seal carver. His grave was designated a National Historic Site in 1949. The inscription on the plaque above the Main Gate of the temple is also in Hosoi's calligraphy.

=== Todoroki Fudō ===
Located near the temple's original location at a ravine in the Tama River is the subsidiary chapel of Myōō-in (明王院). Its honzon is an image of Fudō Myōō claimed to have been made in the Nara period. According to temple legend, a Heian period priest named Kakuban dreamt that he needed to enshrine this statue somewhere in Musashi Province in a place with abundant water. After searching for a suitable location, he selected the Todoroki Ravine, with its river and several waterfalls. The current temple was rebuilt in the Edo period, and its main hall and main gate were relocated from Mangan-ji in 1952 and 1968 respectively.
