= William Wayne Farris =

American Japanologist (born 1951)

- Born: 1951
- Occupation: Historian

William Wayne Farris (born 1951) is an American Japanologist and historian of premodern Japan. His research focuses on Japan's social history, economic history, and historical demography, particularly population, disease, agriculture, and warfare. He taught at the University of Tennessee and the University of Hawaiʻi at Mānoa, where he held the Sen Sōshitsu XV Distinguished Chair and is professor emeritus.

== Biography ==
Born in 1951, Farris earned a BA from DePauw University in 1973, followed by an MA in 1976 and a PhD in 1981 from Harvard University. After serving as an instructor at Harvard from 1980 to 1981, Farris joined the University of Tennessee in 1981 as an assistant professor, became an associate professor in 1988, and was promoted to full professor in 1994. At Tennessee, he also held a Lindsay Young professorship in history. In 1998, while at Tennessee, Farris was a visiting associate professor of Japanese history in Harvard's Department of East Asian Languages and Civilizations. That fall, he and Harold Bolitho taught a course on the samurai; Farris also taught another on ancient and medieval Japanese history that focused on social and economic developments before 1600. In 2004, he moved to the University of Hawaiʻi at Mānoa as the second holder of the Sen Sōshitsu XV Distinguished Chair of Traditional Japanese History and Culture, succeeding H. Paul Varley. He held the chair for twelve years and is professor emeritus of history.

== Scholarship ==
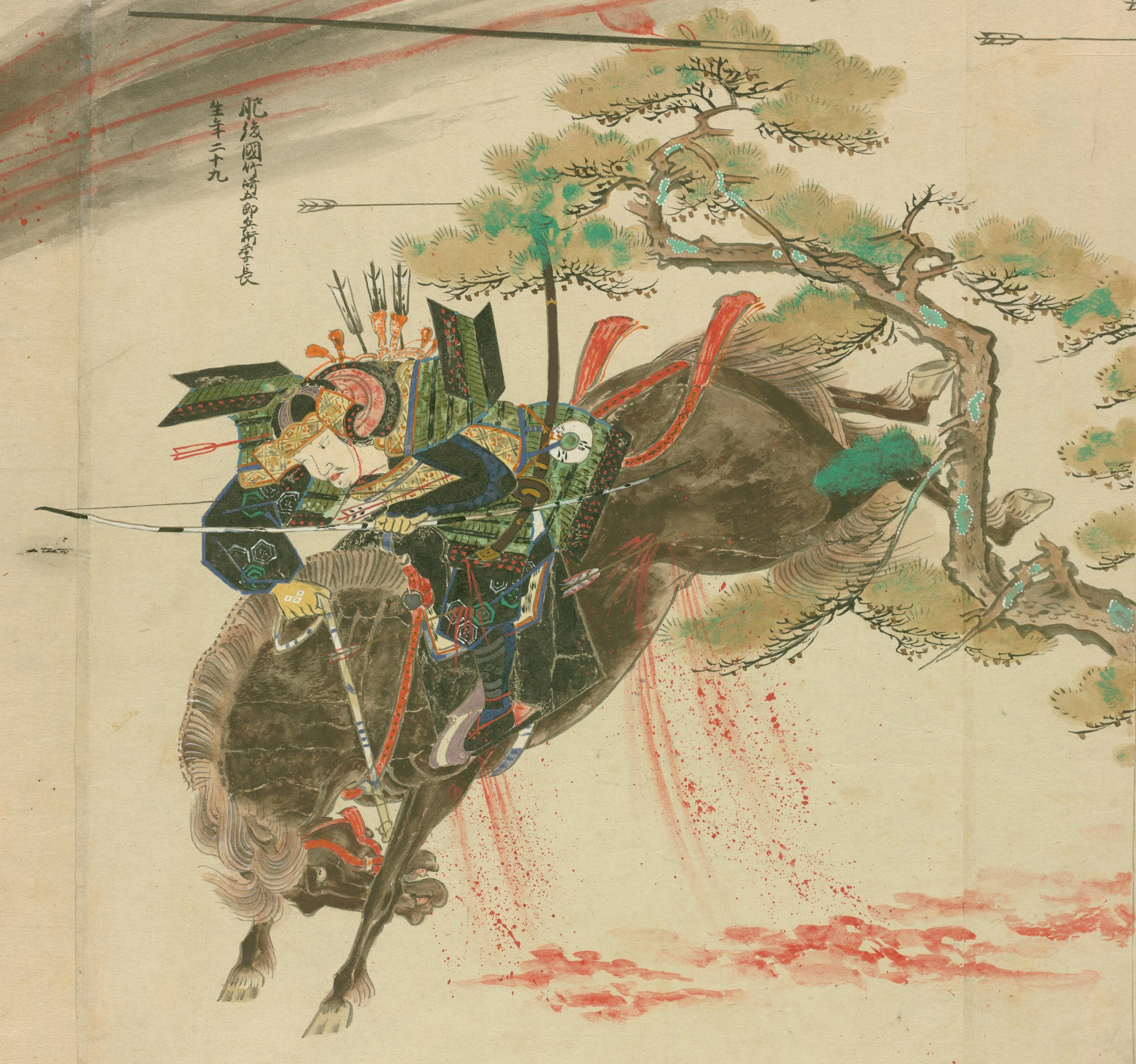
Takezaki Suenaga in the 13th-century Mōko Shūrai Ekotoba

Farris studies the social history and economic history of Japan through 1700. He has examined epidemics, food production, and market exchange, often with attention to people outside the ruling elite. His first book, Population, Disease, and Land in Early Japan, 645–900 (1985), draws on household registers and demographic methods to estimate fertility, mortality, and population change and uses those estimates to reassess agricultural development and the ritsuryō state. Japan's Medieval Population (2006) applies the same approach to medieval Japan from 1150 to 1600. The book was selected as a 2006 Choice Outstanding Academic Title. Daily Life and Demographics in Ancient Japan (2009), in turn, returns to the demographic and social history of Japan from 700 to 1150, spanning the Nara and Heian periods. Reviewer Bruce L. Batten considered its demographic method sound in principle, though he stressed that fragmentary evidence required many assumptions. Batten also praised Farris's willingness to discard earlier views when better evidence appeared. More broadly, Charlotte von Verschuer described him as one of the few Western historians of Japan to concentrate on premodern rural populations.

Farris's population estimates later became inputs into quantitative reconstructions of Japan's long-term economic growth: Jean-Pascal Bassino and his coauthors used figures derived in part from Farris's studies to estimate population and economic output from 730 to 1874, and built on his method for representing uncertainty. Masaki Nakabayashi and his coauthors likewise identified Farris's books as the original sources for population data covering 730 to 1450. The demographic work has also been used outside economic history. Mark Hudson and his coauthors wrote that Farris's 1985 study anticipated later research on resilience of early farming systems. Aleksandra Jarosz and her coauthors used his demographic chronology in a model of the medieval spread of farming and Ryukyuan languages.

Heavenly Warriors (1992) divides Japanese military history from 500 to 1300 into eight periods, using evidence about cavalry, weapons, and battlefield tactics to argue for an evolutionary model rather than relying on analogies with European feudalism. (Note: Reviewer G. Cameron Hurst found the book's central thesis unconvincing, arguing that it played down significant changes in warfare and placed too much weight on continuity, yet concluded that the book greatly advanced understanding of Japan's military history. In the preface to the 1995 paperback edition, Farris wrote that subsequent English-language scholarship, including Hurst's work, had led him to modify parts of his account; he retained the evolutionary thesis but withdrew his use of later war tales as evidence for one-to-one combat. Martin Collcutt later described the book as a detailed and thought-provoking reinterpretation, while also arguing that its model flattened important differences among warriors over the period. In a later survey of the field, David Spafford placed Heavenly Warriors alongside Karl Friday's Hired Swords as the beginning of scholarship that examined warrior origins through military activity rather than chiefly through lordship and institutions. Marius B. Jansen likewise noted the two books' shared emphasis on continuity from Nara and Heian military development into the Kamakura period.) Sacred Texts and Buried Treasures (1998) brings textual evidence together with historical archaeology in four studies of early Japan. Archaeologist Gina L. Barnes regarded it as a useful synthesis but questioned several of its archaeological arguments. (Note: Barnes argued that some archaeological conclusions rested on faulty logic or insufficient evidence and that some "big questions" remained unanswered. She nevertheless called the book a "state-of-the-field" survey, praised its historiographical synthesis and its use of archaeology to clarify textual interpretations, and recommended it with reservations.)

In Japan to 1600 (2009), Farris surveys premodern Japan by tracing changes in population, society, and the economy, giving commoners attention alongside elites and political institutions. Anne Walthall described it as a welcome synthesis of his earlier research. Joan R. Piggott characterized its demographic organization as a move away from political and elite history. Ken Henshall emphasized its treatment of commoners and its attention to population change, disease, famine, and environmental degradation. A Bowl for a Coin (2019) follows tea in Japan from its eighth-century introduction as an elite good to its place in daily life and modern industry, treating tea chiefly as a commodity. Rebecca Corbett praised its attention to continuity and change and the fresh perspective it brought to familiar episodes in tea history. Taka Oshikiri described it as the first English-language study to connect the production, distribution, and consumption of Japanese tea from about 750 to the present.

== Books ==
- Population, Disease, and Land in Early Japan, 645–900. Cambridge, Massachusetts: Council on East Asian Studies, Harvard University, and the Harvard-Yenching Institute. 1985. ISBN 978-0-674-69031-8.
- Heavenly Warriors: The Evolution of Japan's Military, 500–1300. Cambridge, Massachusetts: Council on East Asian Studies, Harvard University. 1992. ISBN 978-0-674-38703-4.
- Sacred Texts and Buried Treasures: Issues in the Historical Archaeology of Ancient Japan. Honolulu: University of Hawaiʻi Press. 1998. ISBN 978-0-8248-2030-5.
- Japan's Medieval Population: Famine, Fertility, and Warfare in a Transformative Age. Honolulu: University of Hawaiʻi Press. 2006. ISBN 978-0-8248-2973-5.
- Japan to 1600: A Social and Economic History. Honolulu: University of Hawaiʻi Press. 2009. ISBN 978-0-8248-3379-4.
- Daily Life and Demographics in Ancient Japan. Ann Arbor, Michigan: Center for Japanese Studies, University of Michigan. 2009. ISBN 978-1-929280-50-6.
- A Bowl for a Coin: A Commodity History of Japanese Tea. Honolulu: University of Hawaiʻi Press. 2019. ISBN 978-0-8248-7660-9.
