= Nancy Stalker =

American Japanologist

- Born: 1962
- Occupations: University teacher, historian, japanologist
- Website: manoa.hawaii.edu/history/directory/nancy-stalker.php

Nancy Kinue Stalker is an American Japanologist and historian, and the incumbent Sen Sōshitsu XV Distinguished Chair of Traditional Japanese History and Culture at the University of Hawaiʻi.

== Biography ==
Nancy Stalker was born in 1962. She graduated with a B.A. in finance and law from Portland State University in 1984, and then worked as a management consultant for Andersen Consulting from 1985 to 1991. She graduated with an M.A. in East Asian studies from Stanford University in 1994, studied Japanese from 1996 to 1997 at the Inter-University Center for Japanese Language Studies, and was awarded her Ph.D. in history from Stanford in 2002; her advisor was Peter Duus.

After a short period as a history lecturer at Yale University, she joined the faculty at the University of Texas at Austin in 2003 as an assistant professor, and was promoted to associate professor in 2008. She subsequently joined the University of Hawaiʻi at Mānoa as the Sen Sōshitsu XV Distinguished Chair of Traditional Japanese History and Culture.

== Selected works ==
- Stalker, Nancy K. (2008). Prophet Motive: Deguchi Onisaburō, Oomoto, and the Rise of New Religions in Imperial Japan. University of Hawaiʻi Press. ISBN 978-0-8248-3172-1.
- Stalker, Nancy K. (2018). Japan: History and Culture from Classical to Cool. University of California Press. ISBN 978-0-520-96283-5.
- Stalker, Nancy K., ed. (2018). Devouring Japan: Global Perspectives on Japanese Culinary Identity. Oxford University Press. ISBN 978-0-19-024042-4.
