= Ike Gyokuran =

Japanese Bunjinga painter, calligrapher and poet

- 池 玉瀾
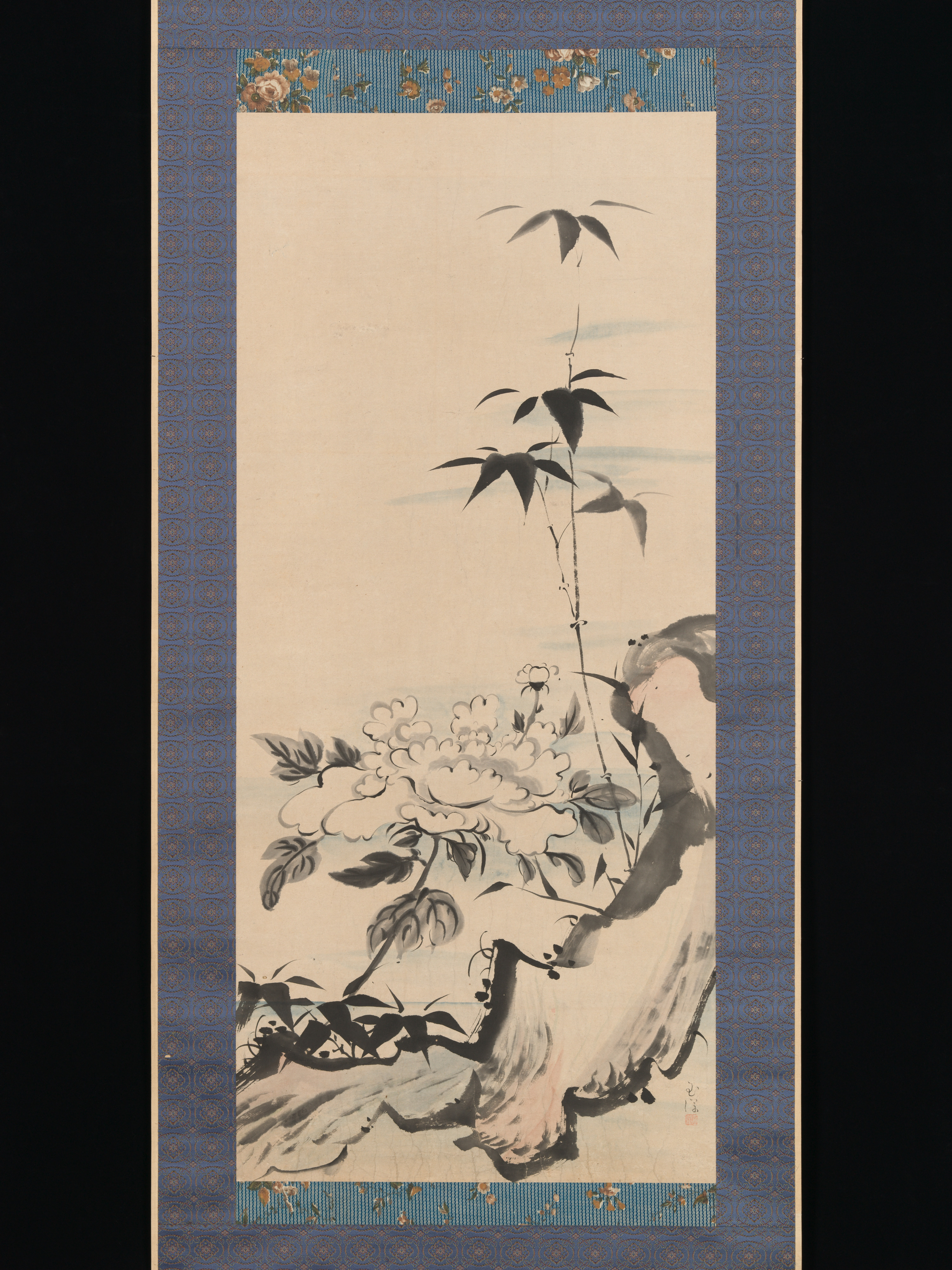
- 牡丹に竹図 - Peony and Bamboo by a Rock, Metropolitan Museum of Art
- Born: 町 (Machi); 1727
- Died: 1784 (aged 56–57)
- Other name: Tokuyama Gyokuran
- Occupations: Painter, calligrapher, and poet
- Spouse: Ike no Taiga (m. 1746; died 1776)

Ike Gyokuran (池 玉瀾; 1727–1784) was a Japanese Bunjinga painter, calligrapher, and poet. She was famous in Kyoto, Japan, during her lifetime, and she remains a celebrated artist in Japan.

Gyokuran was born of a decade long affair between her mother, Yuri, and a high ranking retainer of the ruling Tokugawa shogun. Her parents gave her the birth name Machi (町). As a child, she was given the art-name Gyokuran, meaning "Jewel Waves," most likely by her painting teacher Yanagisawa Kien (1707–1758). Gyokuran married fellow artist Ike no Taiga, and she is best known by her married name Ike Gyokuran. Her surname before marriage was Tokuyama, and she is also known as Tokuyama Gyokuran.

== Early life and education ==
Like her mother, Machi composed waka poetry, but excelled in painting and Calligraphy. Gyokuran began to learn to paint at an early age under famous literati painter Yanagisawa Kien, who was a regular at her mother's teahouse. It is likely that he was the one to introduce her to Ike no Taiga, who became her teacher.

Gyokuran's husband Taiga taught her the painting style of the nanga (Southern painting) movement, a Japanese version of a Chinese style. Gyokuran, in turn, taught her husband poetry in the Japanese waka style, in which she was proficient.

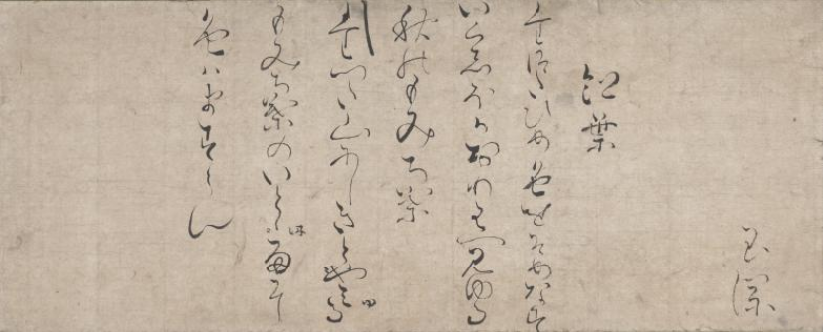
Two Autumn Poems, second half 18th century

The couple were renowned for their eccentricity. They created art together, mutually influencing each other, and were also known to play music together for leisure, as equals. This was highly unusual in a country where women were still widely considered inferior to men. It is noted that Gyokuran did not shave her eyebrows, as was customary for married women at the time.

== Career and impact ==
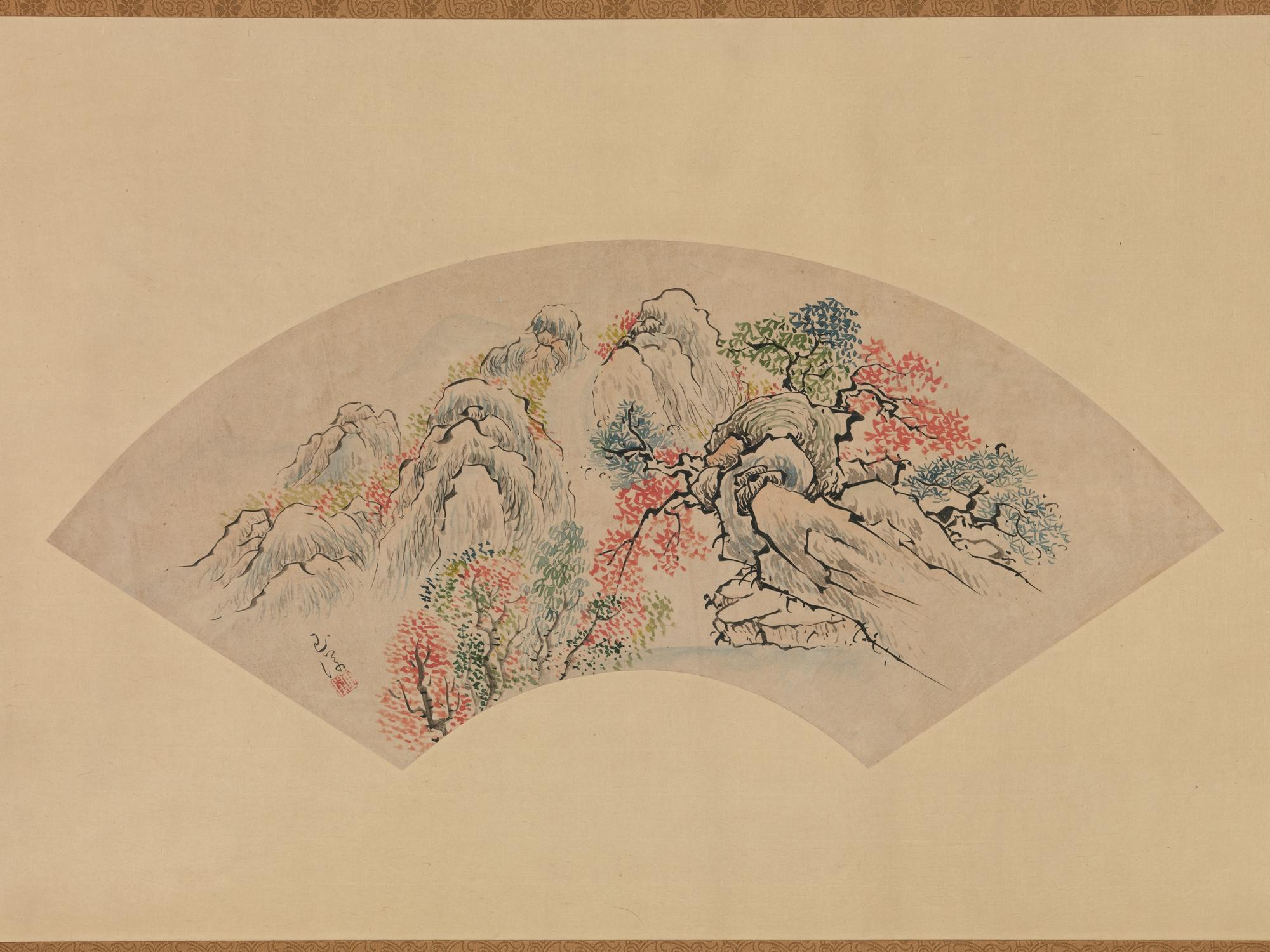
Ike Gyokuran, Fan mounted as a hanging scroll; ink and color on paper. Metropolitan Museum of Art.

Gyokuran painted folding screens and sliding doors, handheld scrolls, hanging scrolls, and fan paintings. "It was exceptionally rare for women in 18th century Japan to be painters," according to Anne d’Harnoncourt, director of the Philadelphia Museum of Art. Gyokuran and her husband Taiga dedicated themselves to making art, living on little money, and sometimes collaborating on art pieces. She lived with Taiga in a small studio next to the Gion shrine in Kyoto. Gyokuran created folding screens, handheld scrolls, hanging scrolls, and fan paintings. She also often painted small scenes, on which she inscribed her poems in calligraphy.

In 1910, her verses were printed alongside a woodblock print of the Matsuya teahouse at the Gion Shrine in the Gion sanjo kashū (Poem Collection of the Three Women of Gion).

To this day, during Kyoto's yearly Jidai Matsuri (Festival of the Ages), young women dress up as prominent female figures of Kyoto history, including Gyokuran.

Work by Gyokuran was included in a pair of linked exhibitions held in Tokyo in 2015, titled "Splendid Japanese Women Artists in the Edo Period" at the Kōsetsu Museum of Art in Tokyo and “Uemura Shoen and Splendid Japanese Women Artists” at the Yamatane Museum.
