= H. Paul Varley =

American historian

Herbert Paul Varley (February 8, 1931 – December 15, 2015) was an American academic, historian, author, and Japanologist. He was a professor at Columbia University and Sen Sōshitsu XV Professor of Japanese Cultural History at the University of Hawaii.

== Career ==
Among other interests, his research focused on the Kamakura period and Muromachi period in the history of Japan.

== Selected works ==
In an overview of writings by and about Varley, OCLC/WorldCat lists roughly 38 works in 124 publications in 6 languages and 8,208 library holdings.

This list is not finished; you can help Wikipedia by adding to it.

- 1967 -- The Onin War; history of its origins and background with a selective translation of the Chronicle of Onin. New York: Columbia University Press. ISBN 978-0-231-02943-8
- 1968 -- A Syllabus of Japanese Civilization. New York: Columbia University Press. OCLC 268563
- 1971 -- Imperial Restoration in Medieval Japan. New York: Columbia University Press. ISBN 978-0-231-03502-6; OCLC 142480
- 1973 -- Japanese Culture: a Short History. New York: Prager. OCLC 590531
- 1980 -- A Chronicle of Gods and Sovereigns: Jinnō Shōtōki of Kitabatake Chikafusa. New York: Columbia University Press. ISBN 978-0-231-04940-5
- 1994 -- Warriors of Japan as Portrayed in the War Tales. Honolulu: University of Hawaii Press. ISBN 978-0-8248-1601-8
- 2000—Japanese Culture. 4th Edition. Honolulu: University of Hawaii Press.

== Honors ==
- Order of the Rising Sun, Gold Rays With Rosette, 1969.
