= Muro Kyūsō =

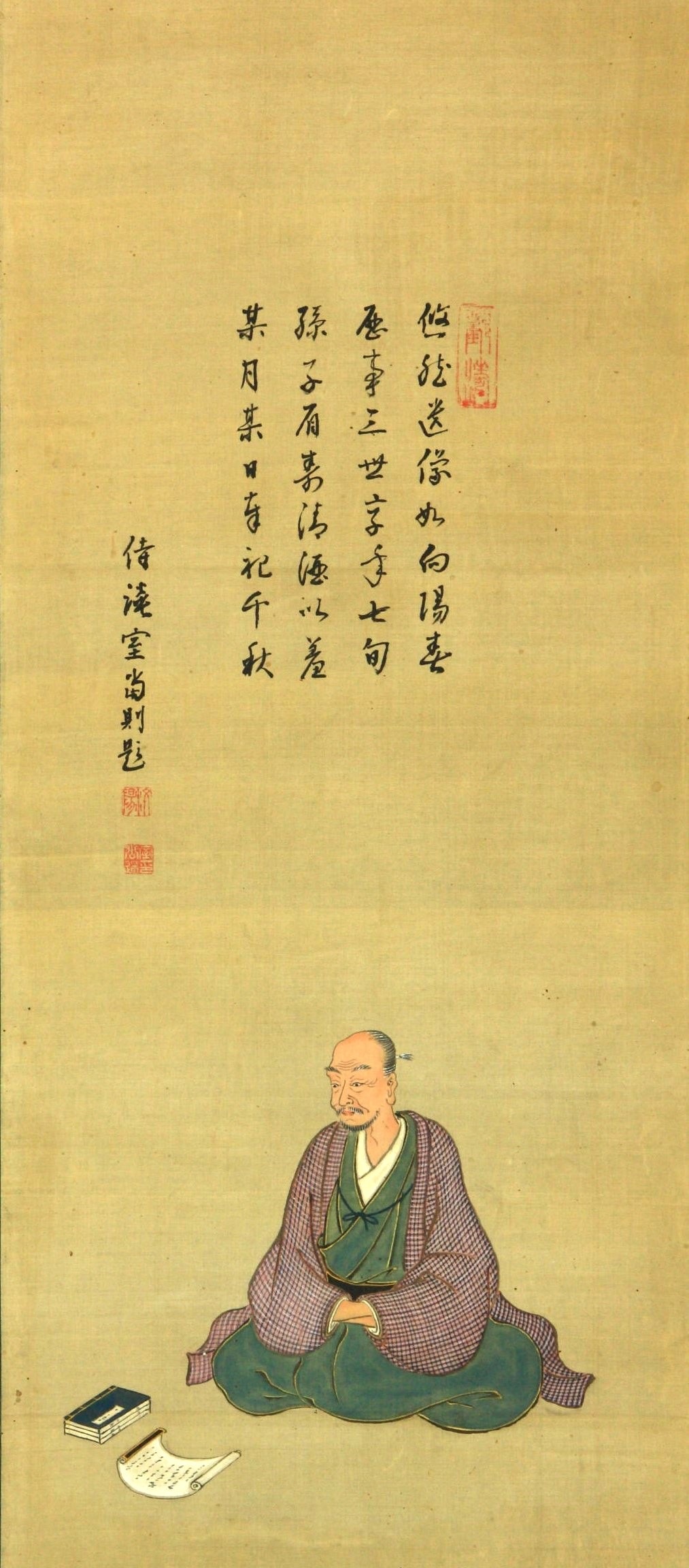
Muro Kyūsō, Japanese philosopher, 1658 - 1734

Muro Kyūsō (室鳩巣) or Muro Naokiyo (直清) (March 30, 1658 – September 9, 1734), was a Neo-Confucian scholar and an official of the Tokugawa shogunate during the rule of Tokugawa Yoshimune. Muro was responsible for the reintroduction of orthodox neo-Confucianist thought into government and societal life, attempting to reverse the growth of unorthodox views that were becoming popular during this time. He was also an author of Neo-Confucianist works, such as the Shundai Zatsuwa and Rikuyu engi taigi, although much of his work would only be known posthumously. Muro was a proponent of the Chu Hsi school of thought.

== Life ==
Muro was born in Yanaka, Musashi Province (modern day Tokyo) and from an early age loved books and study. At the age of 15, he travelled to the Kaga Domain and was able to gain employment by the daimyō of the region. The cottage he lived in was given the name "Pigeon Nest" and from this he adopted the name Kyuso, a name he would keep until the end of his life. Muro was a disciple of Yamazaki Ansai and strove to purge all traces of Shintoism from Edo Neo-Confuciansim.

From 1711 until the day of his death, Muro was a devoted member of the Tokugawa government, receiving the highest rank the government awarded to scholars at the time. As a severe devotee to orthodox neo-Confucianism, his authority helped him fight against critics of the doctrine.

On September 9, 1734, Muro died and was buried in Edo at his own request.
