= Yanagisawa Kien =

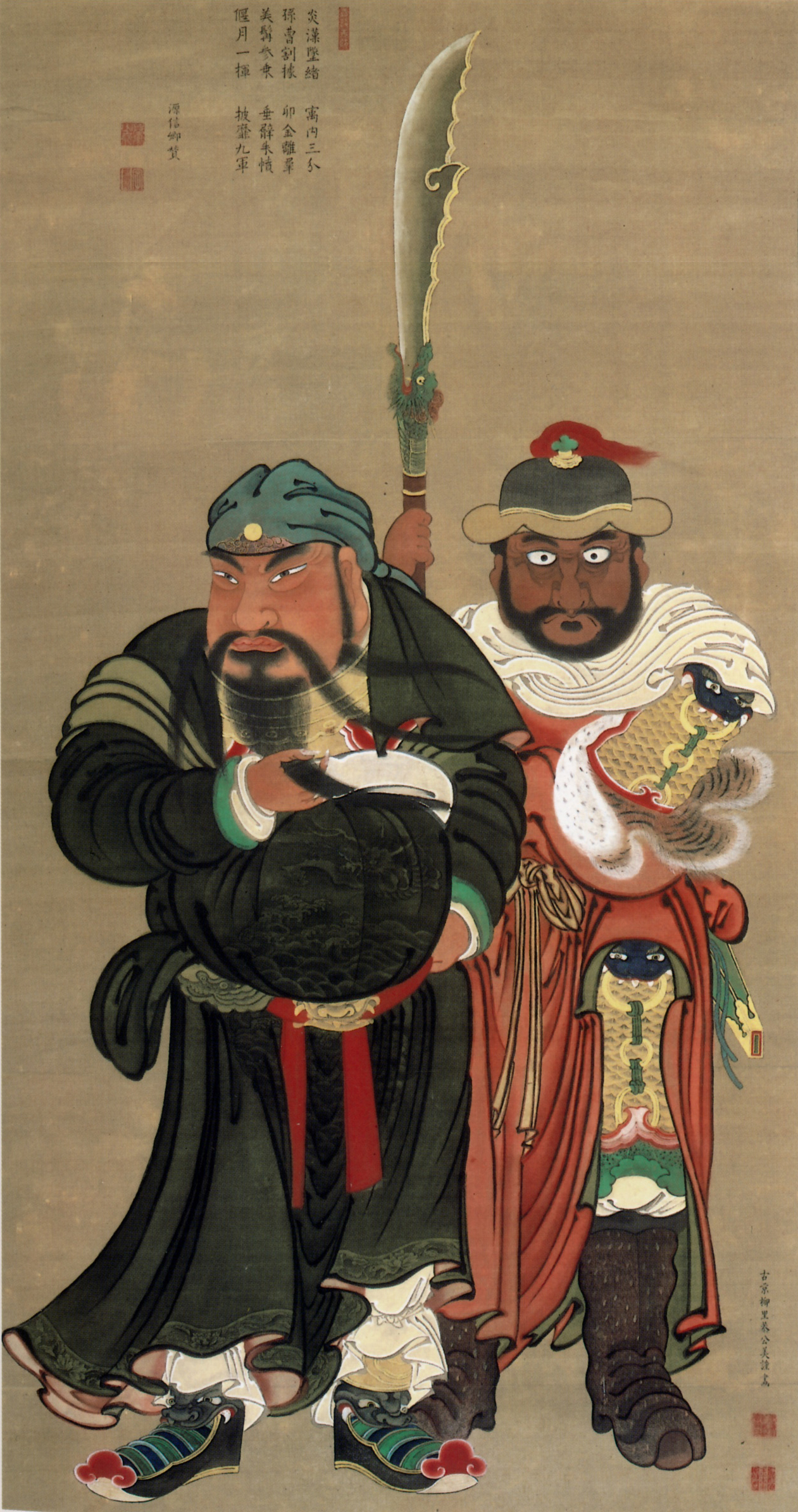
Characters from Kan'u (1737), one of the Kabuki Jūhachiban

Yanagisawa Kien, originally Rikyō (Japanese:柳沢 淇園; 30 August 1703, Edo – 6 October 1758, Kōriyama) was a Japanese painter in the nanga style. His other art names included Chikkei (竹渓) and Gyokkei (玉桂).

== Life and work ==
His father was one of the most important members of the Yanagisawa clan, with princely seat at Kōriyama Castle. As a child, he lived in Edo and developed an interest in painting at the age of nine. He began his training with artists of the Kanō school, but became a disciple of Watanabe Shūseki, who practiced the Nagasaki-e style of woodcut art. Later, he studied nanga painting under the direction of Gion Nankai.

He also became a follower of the Zen monks of the Ōbaku school of Buddhism, which may have prompted him to study Chinese painting from the Yuan and Ming dynasties and familiarize himself with the Manual of the Mustard Seed Garden. In 1727, due to inheritance problems, he moved to the family estates in Kōriyama, took charge of some of his relatives' financial affairs, and remained there until his death.

Philosophically, he was influenced by the Confucianist scholar, Ogyū Sorai, who served as a retainer for the Yanagisawas. From the age of fifteen, he was an essayist and is said to have excelled at all sixteen of the subjects that comprised a classical education; including calligraphy, poetry and the tea ceremony. He was apparently also trained in acupuncture.

He specialized in painting bamboo. Relatively few of his works have survived, whereas copies and forgeries are numerous.

== Sources ==
- S. Noma (Ed.): "Yanagizawa Kien". In: Japan. An Illustrated Encyclopedia. Kodansha, 1993, ISBN 4-06-205938-X.
- Laurance P. Roberts: "Kien". In: A Dictionary of Japanese Artists. Weatherhill, 1976. ISBN 0-8348-0113-2.
