= Ike no Taiga =

Japanese painter and calligrapher born in Kyoto during the Edo period

- 池大雅
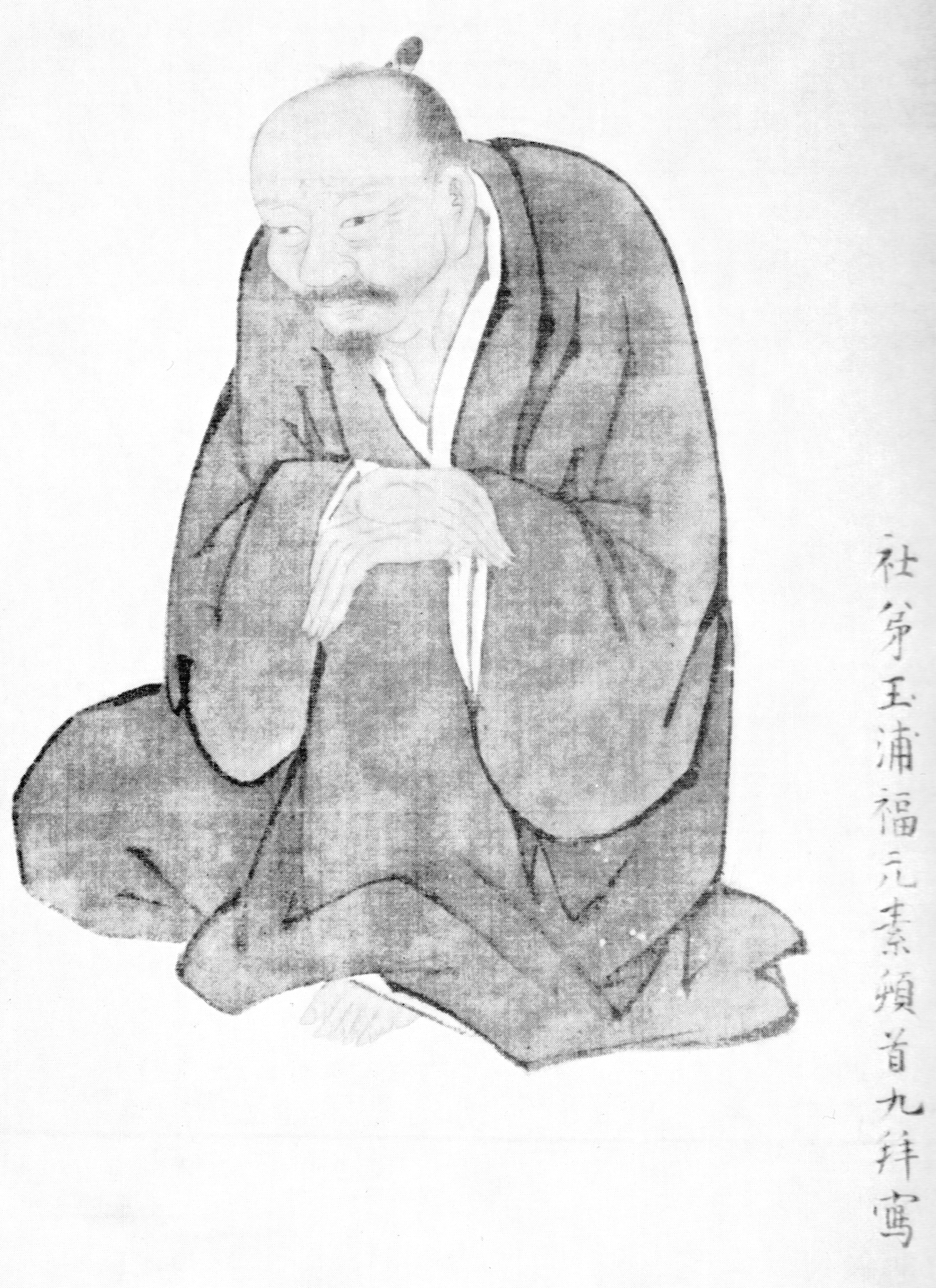
- Portrait of Ike no Taiga by Fukuhara Gogaku
- Born: 1723
- Died: 1776 (aged 52–53)
- Occupations: Painter, calligrapher, and poet
- Spouse: Ike Gyokuran (m. 1746; died 1776)

Ike no Taiga (池大雅; June 6, 1723, in Kyōto, Japan — May 30, 1776, in Kyōto) was a Japanese painter and calligrapher born in Kyoto during the Edo period. Together with Yosa Buson, he perfected the bunjinga (or nanga) genre. The majority of his works reflected his passion for classical Chinese culture and painting techniques, though he also incorporated revolutionary and modern techniques into his otherwise very traditional paintings. As a bunjin (文人, literati, man of letters), Ike was close to many of the prominent social and artistic circles in Kyoto, and in other parts of the country, throughout his lifetime.

== Life ==
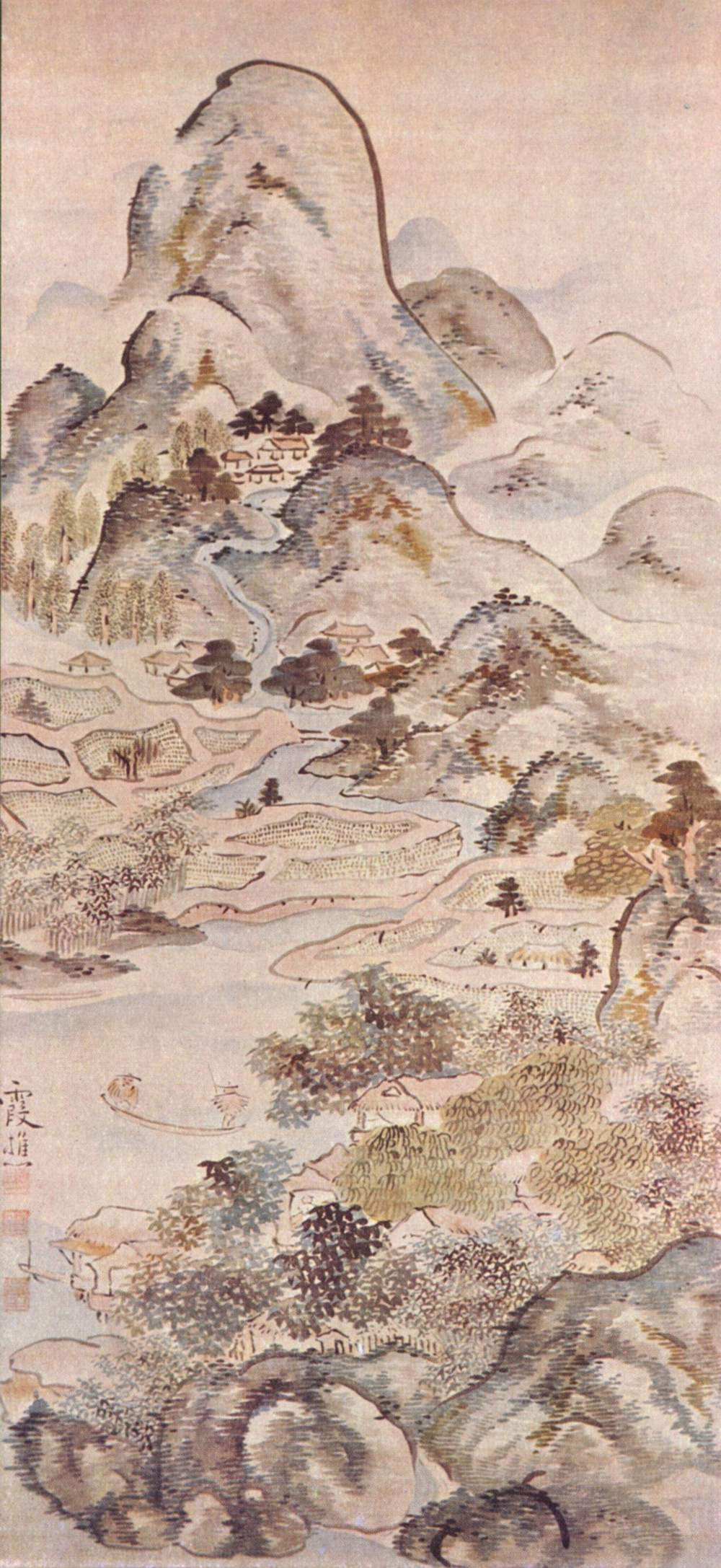
Fishing in Springtime, Cleveland Museum of Art

Ike no Taiga was born into a poor and socially humble family; his father was a farmer on the outskirts of Kyoto. The family moved into Kyoto proper some years before Taiga's birth, possibly to escape famine. His father found work at the silver mint, which granted his family some small degree of wealth, but he died when Taiga was three years of age. Taiga's widowed mother somehow managed to afford to provide him with good teachers, in all the classical Japanese and Chinese disciplines. At age six, he began receiving instruction in calligraphy and religious matters at the Manpuku-ji Zen temple. He would continue to foster strong connections with this temple for the remainder of his life.

By age fourteen, Taiga was a professional artist and distinguished calligrapher. He ran a small fan-painting shop in Kyoto, and engraved artists' and collectors' seals as well. It was an encounter with Yanagisawa Kien, a major social and artistic figure of the time, that initiated Taiga's introduction to the world of the bunjin.

Chinese painter Yi Fujiu (J: I Fukyū or Yi Hai, 1698-1740?), whose main activity was selling horses in Nagasaki, taught Chinese literati painting that soon became the main model for Ike no Taiga, as reported in the I Fukyū Ike no Taiga sansui gafu (A Painting Manual of Landscapes by Yi Fujiu and Ike no Taiga) published in 1803. Taiga studied painting and calligraphy under Kien beginning in 1738. He became quite fond of the eccentric, but ancient, practice of painting with fingertips and fingernails, and became close friends with two other bunjin students, Kan Tenju and Kō Fuyō. By the age of twenty (1743), Taiga fully considered himself a member of the literati, and took the name "Ike," shortened from his family name "Ikeno" (池野), in emulation of the Chinese tendency for single-character names.

Taiga returned to Kyoto and to his fan shop in the early 1740s. Though the bunjin lifestyle dictated an avoidance of commercialism, Taiga had no other source of income and so he continued to sell his works and various artistic services, much like his contemporary and friend Yosa Buson. He married an artist and tea house proprietor in 1746, who went by the art-name (gō) Gyokuran. The pair quickly became well-renowned in the social circles and artistic community of Kyoto. Two years into his marriage, Taiga set off on a series of journeys, another major element of the bunjin lifestyle. He sought to commune with nature, to glean inspiration for his art, and most of all, to simply become a more cultured and experienced individual. After travels through Kanazawa, Nikkō, and Mount Fuji, Taiga stayed for a time in Edo. There, he produced paintings and calligraphic pieces, and also learned about Dutch art from a number of Rangaku (Dutch learning) scholars, including Noro Genjō.

Taiga would continue to travel and to climb mountains for much of the rest of his life, often accompanied by bunjin colleagues. For a time, he took on the gō of Sangaku Dōja (三岳道者, "Pilgrim of the Three Peaks"). He would often collaborate with his colleagues on joint works of art during this trips; the Jūben jūgi-jō (Album of Ten Conveniences and Ten Pleasures) was created in 1771, as the result of one of these collaborations. The Jūben jūgi-jō, illustrated by Taiga and Yosa Buson, and containing text by Chinese writer Li Yu (1611-c.1680), acclaims and celebrates a life of simple pleasures and communing with nature. The book is widely regarded today as providing an exemplary insight into the bunjin philosophy.

Another artist who would have a dramatic influence on Taiga a little later in life, after his return to Kyoto, was Hakuin Ekaku, who stayed briefly at Taiga's home in 1752. Though they met only briefly, Taiga began to use elements of Hakuin's personal style, and he soon afterwards sought out many of Hakuin's disciples, working with them and inscribing one another's works.

Some of Taiga's works have been classified National Treasures by the Japanese government.
