= List of cultural properties of Japan – paintings (Ōita) =

This list is of the cultural properties of Japan designated in the category of paintings (絵画, kaiga) for the Prefecture of Ōita.

== National Cultural Properties ==
As of 1 July 2019, eight Important Cultural Properties have been designated, being of national significance.

Property	Date	Municipality	Ownership	Comments	Image	Dimensions	Coordinates	Ref.
Illustrated Lotus Sutra, colour on thin silk 綾本著色法華経絵〈（旧宇佐八幡神輿障子絵）／四曲屏風〉 ryōhon chakushoku Hoke-kyō-e	Kamakura period	Usa	Ōita Prefectural Museum of History	shōji paintings from the Usa Hachiman mikoshi, remounted as a pair of four-panel byōbu; in total there are fourteen panels, the designation comprises these eight, the so-called Tokuji-bon (徳治本); the other six, the so-called Ōei-bon (応永本), are split equally between Usa Jingū, Ōita Prefectural Museum of History, and the Waseda University Aizu Yaichi Memorial Museum (早稲田大学會津八一記念博物館)			33°32′34″N 131°21′57″E	
Three Friends of Winter with a Pair of Cranes, colour on silk, by Tanomura Chikuden 絹本著色歳寒三友雙鶴図〈田能村竹田筆／〉 kenpon chakushoku saikan sanyū sōkaku zu (Tanomura Chikuden hitsu)	1832					150 centimetres (59 in) by 57 centimetres (22 in)		
Hōgyū Kōrin, colour on silk 絹本著色放牛光林像 kenpon chakushoku Hōgyū Kōrin zō	Nanboku-chō period	Yufu	Ryūshō-ji (龍祥寺)				33°12′01″N 131°30′53″E	
Boating on the Inagawa River, colour on silk, by Tanomura Chikuden 紙本淡彩稲川舟遊図〈田能村竹田筆／己丑（文政十二年）の自賛がある〉 kenpon chakushoku Ina-gawa funaasobi-zu (Tanomura Chikuden hitsu)	1829	Ōita	Ōita Prefecture (kept at the Ōita Prefectural Art Museum)			132.8 centimetres (52.3 in) by 46.3 centimetres (18.2 in)	33°14′22″N 131°36′05″E	
Fujiwara no Kanesuke from the Thirty-Six Immortals of Poetry, colour on paper, from the Satake Collection 紙本著色三十六歌仙切〈（兼輔）／佐竹家伝来〉 shihon chakushoku sanjūrokkasen setsu (Kanesuke Satake-ke denrai)	Kamakura period		private	one scroll				
Illustrated Biography of Yūgyō Shōnin, colour on paper 紙本著色遊行上人絵伝〈巻第七／〉 shihon chakushoku Yūgyō Shōnin e-den	Nanboku-chō period	Beppu	Eifuku-ji (永福寺)	one handscroll (scroll seven)			33°18′58″N 131°28′37″E	
Wall Paintings from the Ō-dō 大堂壁画 ōdō hekiga	Heian period	Bungotakada	Fuki-ji				33°32′16″N 131°31′43″E	
Materials relating to Tanomura Chikuden 田能村竹田関係資料〈／帆足家伝来〉 Tanomura Chikuden kankei shiryō (Hoashi-ke denrai)	late Edo period	Ōita	Ōita City (kept at Ōita City Art Museum)	designation includes his Flowering Plants (White Plum Blossoms) (花卉図（白梅図）) (1808), Flowers and Birds of the Four Seasons (四季花鳥図) (1809), Sparrows and Amaranthus Tricolor (雁来紅群雀図) (1813), Fuji (富士図) (1819), White Cranes (白鶴図) (1822), Geese and Reeds in the Moonlight (月下芦雁図) (1823), Plum Blossoms and Study with accompanying poem (梅花書屋図及題詩) (1824), Incense and Sparse Shadows (暗香疎影図) (1831), and Peach Blossoms and Running Waters (桃花流水図) (1832) (pictured, in order)			33°13′24″N 131°36′07″E	

== See also ==
- Cultural Properties of Japan
- List of National Treasures of Japan (paintings)
- Japanese painting
- List of Historic Sites of Japan (Ōita)
