= Okada Hankō =

Japanese artist (1782–1846)

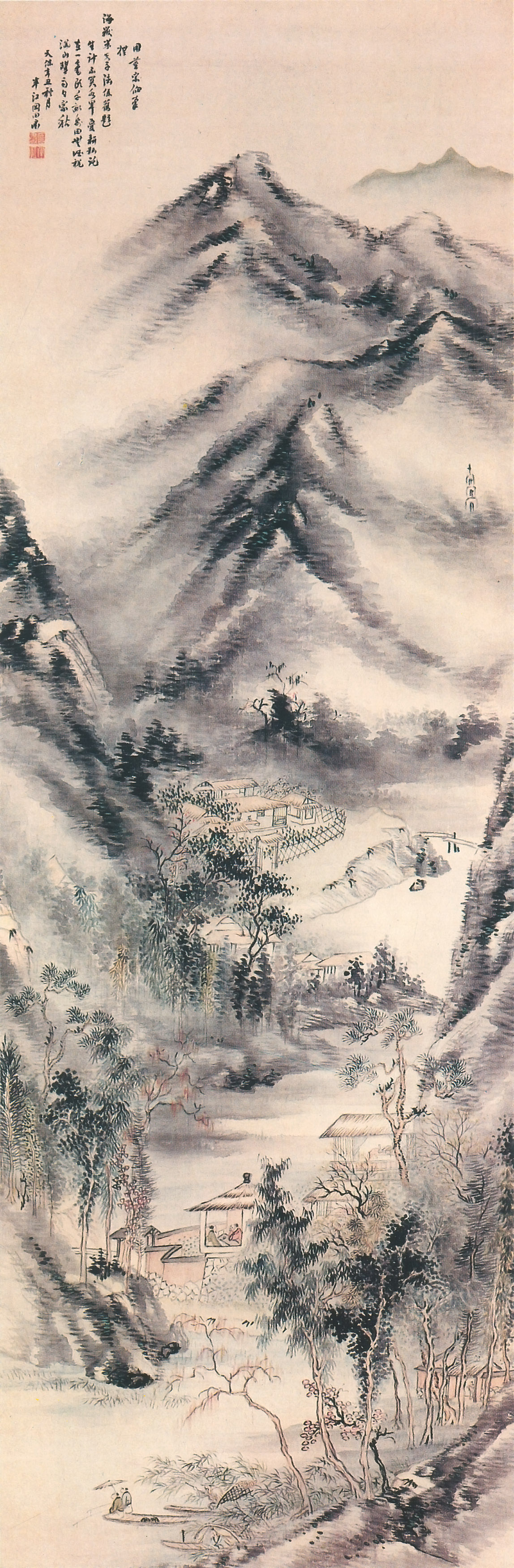
Okada Hankō, Rain in the deep mountains (1841)

Okada Hankō (岡田 半江; 1782–1846) was a Japanese painter of the Edo period, who worked in the Nanga (also called literati or Bunjinga) style of painting. He was the son of the noted individualist Nanga painter and rice merchant, Okada Beisanjin. Hankō was part of the third generation of literati painters in Japan, which had better access to Chinese paintings than had earlier painters, so they were no longer dependent on painting handbooks and copies of Chinese originals. Many of Hankō's paintings use sophisticated brushwork in complex compositions, with subtle colors added to the predominant black ink, but he also painted in ink with more vigorous brushwork and was a calligrapher of note.

== Family and early life ==
As with most Nanga painters, Hankō was not a true amateur in the Chinese literati tradition: both he and his father were of samurai rank, held positions the local government, and managed the family rice business. Hankō painted on commission, as well as for pleasure.

The family lived in Ōsaka in a building owned by Lord Tōdō. Beisanjin's painting studio (Seihan) was there as well, within view of the Yodo River. As a child, Hankō was exposed to his father's artistic circle, including the leading literati of the day, such as Uragami Gyokudō, Tanomura Chikuden, Totoki Baigai, and Rai San'yō. Hankō began painting at an early age, with his first dated works (Solitary Pavilion beneath a Pine and The Red Cliff) inscribed with the ages of 12 and 13. His father was his first teacher, not just of painting, but the other subjects of a literatus: history, Confucianism, literature, poetry, tea, and perhaps music. Another teacher may have been Tanke Gessen, a priest and poet from Ise.

== Collaboration with Beisanjin ==
Hankō collaborated on paintings with his father from 1806 until Beisanjin's death in 1820. For example, he wrote the poetry for the paintings included in "Association for the Painting of China's Scenic Spots" that commemorated a gathering of friends, for which both Beisanjin and Hankō also provided paintings. Among the works they painted together are Bamboo, Plum, and Rock in 1813 and a painting of flowers and fruits in honor of Chikuden's 40th birthday. An example of Hankō's collaborations with friends is Autumn Landscape, from an album of paintings with Baigai and Yamagawa Kozan from 1805.

== Head of the family and independent painting ==
A series of deaths of people close to him led to changes in Hankō's life: first, his mother died in 1818, his father (and another prominent literatus, Uragami Gyokudō) in 1820, and his wife in 1822. On his father's death, Hankō took over the running of running of the family rice shop. After his wife's death, he retired early from his government position with the Tsu han. Hankō moved to the Temma neighborhood of Ōsaka to live "in retirement" as a proper literatus would, away from the city.

His paintings from this time are in a variety of styles, from those influenced by Beisanjin (Boating on the Yodo River, 1827) to those that increasingly integrate techniques of Chinese painters (Streams through the Mountains, 1824, and Landscape in the Style of Mi Fu, 1830). Hankō had access to Chinese paintings in his father's collection that he inherited, in his friends collections, and to the knowledge gained by Chikuden, who visited Nagasaki in the late 1820s to study Chinese paintings, and who afterwards visited Hankō.

Hankō's life was impacted by a number of events during the 1830s. His health appears to have been poor and he put his son in charge of the family rice shop when Kyūka was 13. Two close friends, Rai San'yō in 1832 and Tanomura Chikuden, died in 1835. Of greater importance was the Tempō famine in Ōsaka (1832–36), leading to attacks on the houses of merchants and moneylenders in large towns. In 1837, a revolt, led by Ōshio Heihachirō, a well-known literatus, broke out in Ōsaka. The revolt was put down on the same day. In addition to the loss of his friend, Hankō's secondary residence was destroyed, along with his collection of books and paintings that he had inherited from his father.

Despite these losses, this was the time when Hankō's painting style began to combine a variety of influences from his earlier life into a coherent style uniquely his own. According to Tanomura Chikuden, there had been so much progress that "it was difficult to find a resemblance to his earlier works." Hankō moved to the area just north of the Sumiyoshi Shrine and it was here that finest paintings were produced, such as Crows Rising in Spring Mist (Tōyama Kinenkan, Ōsaka); Rain in the Deep Mountains (Private Collection, Japan), and Views of Sumiyoshi (Ueno Collection, Japan).

== Death ==
In the last years of his life, Hankō moved back to his home in Ōsaka. He died there in 1846 and was buried near his parents in the cemetery of Jikishi-an.

== Institutional holdings ==
His works are held in institutions around the world, including in Japan, the Ōsaka Shiritsu Bijitsukan, Tōyama Kinenkan (Saitama), and Idemitsu Museum of Arts (Tokyo), and in the US, the Indianapolis Museum of Art, Honolulu Museum of Art, the University of Michigan Museum of Art, the Metropolitan Museum of Art, the Minneapolis Institute of Art, and the Los Angeles County Museum of Art, as well as in many private collections.

== See also ==
- Japanese painting
