= Oita Art Museum =

- 大分市美術館
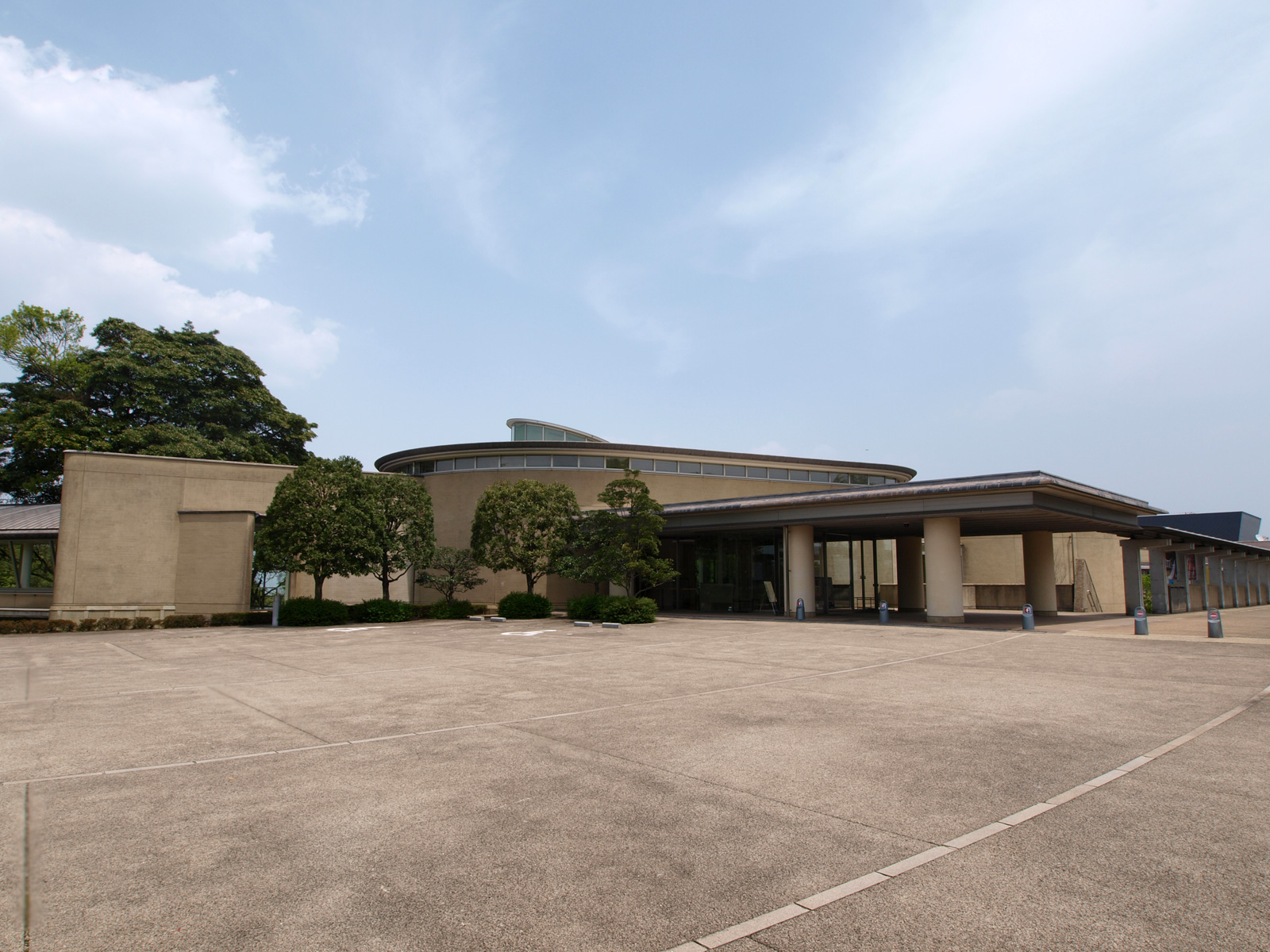
- Interactive map of the Oita Art Museum area

General information
- Location: 865 Ueno, Ōita, Ōita Prefecture, Japan
- Coordinates: 33°13′25″N 131°36′08″E
- Opened: 17 February 1999

Website
- Official website

Oita Art Museum (大分市美術館, Ōita-shi Bijutsukan) opened in Ōita, Ōita Prefecture, Japan, in 1999. The collection includes Nihonga, Yōga, Bungo Nanga, crafts, modern art, and the Important Cultural Property Materials relating to Tanomura Chikuden.

== See also ==
- List of Cultural Properties of Japan - paintings (Ōita)
- Ōita Prefectural Art Museum
