= Ōita City Historical Museum =

Japanese museum

- 大分市歴史資料館
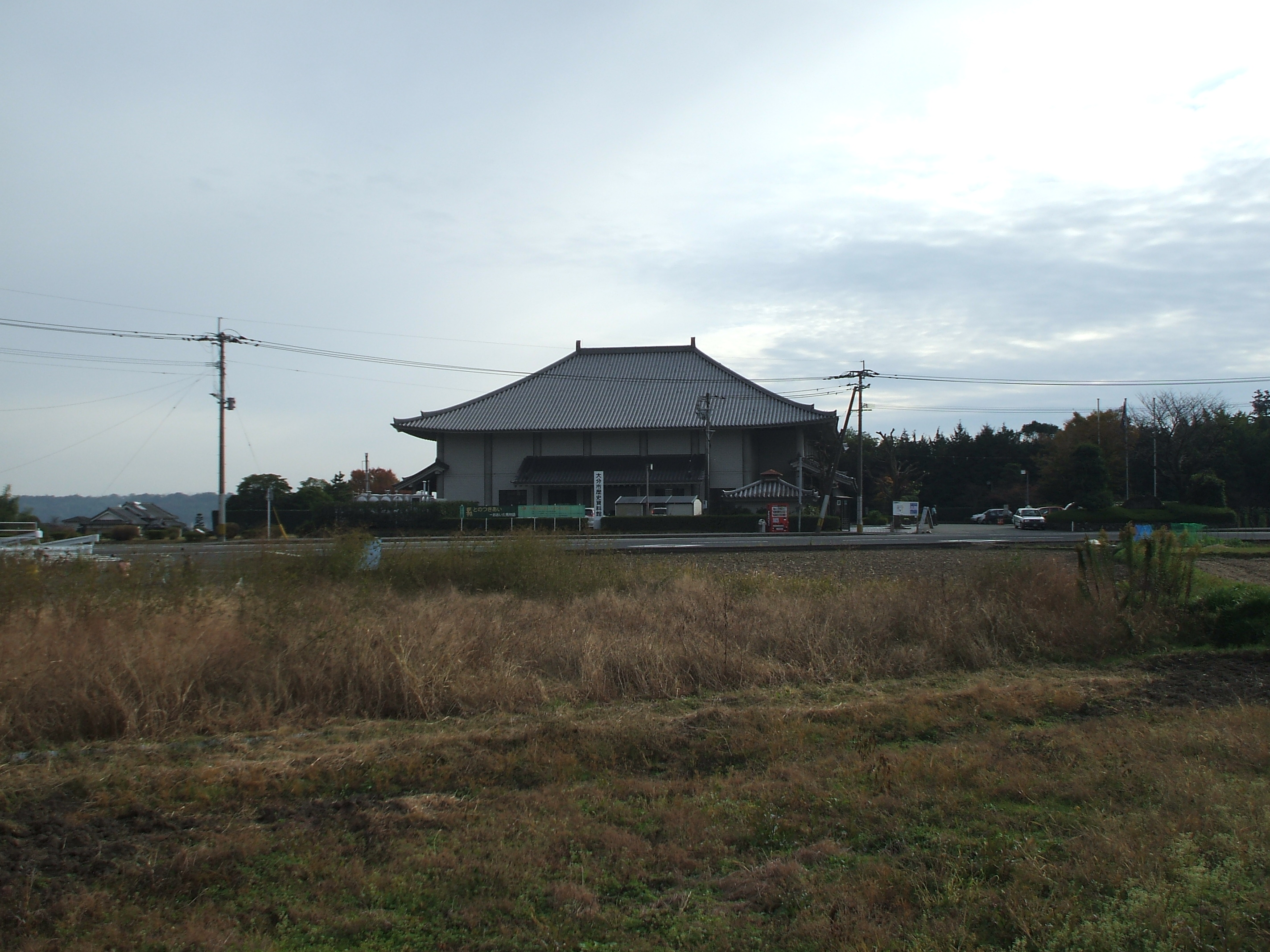
- Interactive map of the Ōita City Historical Museum area

General information
- Location: 960-1, Kokubu, Ōita, Ōita Prefecture, Japan
- Coordinates: 33°11′43″N 131°33′10″E
- Opened: 15 April 1987

Website
- Official website

Ōita City Historical Museum (大分市歴史資料館, Ōita-shi Rekishi Shiryōkan) opened in Ōita, Ōita Prefecture, Japan, in 1987. The collection comprises materials relating to Ōita. The museum itself is on the site of the former Bungo Kokubun-ji (豊後国分寺), the provincial temple of Bungo province.

== See also ==
- List of Cultural Properties of Japan - paintings (Ōita)
- Ōita Prefectural Museum of History
