= Tanomura Chikuden =

Tanomura Chikuden 田能村竹田
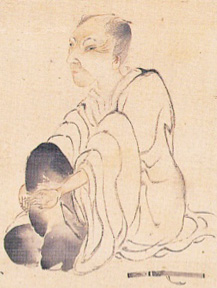
- Self portrait
- Born: July 14, 1777; Takeda-mura, Naoiri-gun, Bungo Province, Japan
- Died: October 20, 1835 (aged 58); Osaka, Japan

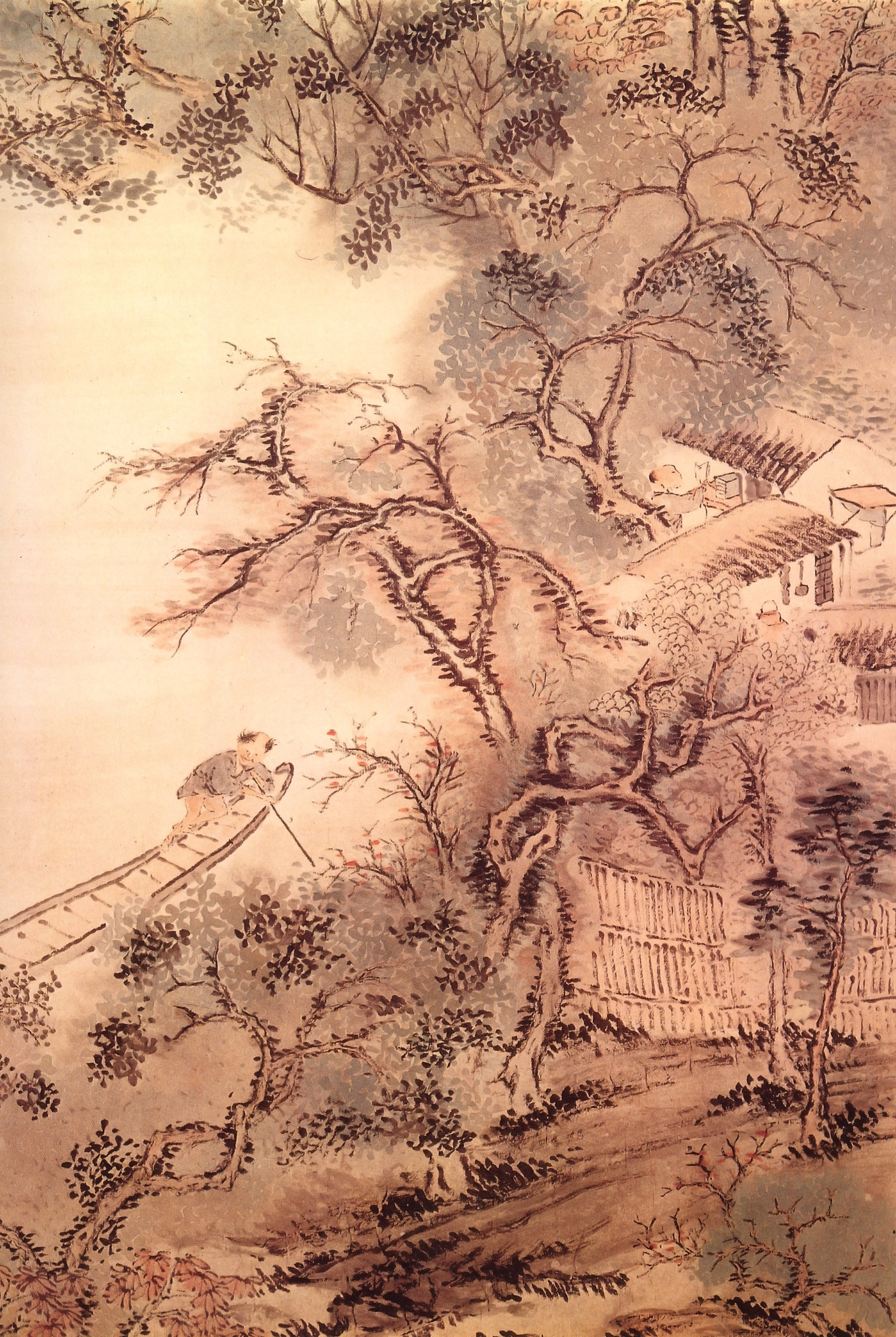
Detail of Boating on the Inagawa river (1829).

Tanomura Chikuden (田能村 竹田; Japanese pronunciation: [tɕi̥.kɯꜜ.deɴ], July 14, 1777 – October 20, 1835) was an artist and Confucian scholar of Edo period Japan.

== Biography ==
Tanomura Chikuden was the second son of Nomura Sekian, a Confucian doctor of Oka Domain, and was born in Taketa Village, Naoniri District, Bungo Province. As his status was very low among the samurai of the domain, he was entitled to receive only a small stipend of 12 koku, but actually received about 60% of this stipend due to the poverty of the domain. He started reading at the age of six and entered the domain academy "Yugakukan" at the age of 11. His grades were extremely good and his poetic talent was soon recognized, but he was forced to quit school due to health issues. In 1794, at the age of 18, his mother and older brother died, and the following year he became the heir of the Tanomura family and was received by the daimyo of the domain in audience. From around the age of 20, he studied painting with a local painter, and took what is would now be called a correspondence course with the noted bunjin-ga painter Tani Bunchō in Edo. When he was 22 years old, he served as a Confucian scholar at the Yugakukan and eventually became its president. He decided to quit his medical practice and concentrate on academics, and by order of the shogunate, he was involved in the compilation of an official history of Bungo Province.

In 1801, he moved to Edo to prepare for compilation of his history project. Along the way, he visited Kimura Kenkadō in Osaka, and visited Tani Bunchō in Edo. In 1805, he traveled to Kyoto for about two years, stopping at Hakata, Nagasaki, Kumamoto, Kokura, and Shimonoseki on the way, in order to treat eye diseases and study Confucianism. In Osaka, he became acquainted with Uragami Gyokudō, Okada Beisanjin, Ueda Akinari, and others. In 1811, he met Rai San'yō and they became close friends. Also, in the fall of this year, he was taught painting techniques by Noro Kaiseki.

However, in 1811, a peasant uprising broke out within Oka Domain in opposition to the monopoly system. Takeda twice submitted written petitions calling for reform of the domain's administration, including relief for farmers and the promotion of learning, but as his suggestions were not accepted, and he submitted his resignation in 1812 stating the need for medical treatment as an excuse. The following year, he retired at the age of 37, but he was given a nominal salary of two koku as a retirement allowance, which shows the trust placed in him by those around him. He traveled back and forth between Bungo and the Kansai region, and interacted with literary figures, including Rai San'yō, Okada Hankō, Uragami Shunkin, Kan Chazan, and Aoki Mokubei. In 1825, at the age of 50, he traveled to Nagasaki, where he studied Chinese painting techniques from visiting Nagasaki school painters. In the summer of 1835, he died at The Oka Domain residence in Osaka at the age of 59.

Currently, Tanomura Chikuden's works are in the collections of many art galleries and museums across Japan, including approximately 200 pieces at the Idemitsu Museum of Arts, 45 pieces at the Ōita City Art Museum, and 10 pieces at the Takeda City History Museum. Many of these works are designated as National Important Cultural Properties.

== Career ==
Tanomura Chikuden respected the Four Masters of the Yuan dynasty and Mi Youren of the Song dynasty. By learning various painting styles from his interactions with many people, he expanded his field of painting to include landscapes, figures, and flowers and birds, and through realism expressed the essence of literati painting. In his later years, he achieved a delicate style that emphasized his gentle strokes and melancholy tone. He also wrote works on the Nanga school, of which the Sanchūjin jōzetsu (The Recluse's Tattle), a history and theory of Japanese literati paintings, is the best known.

== Chikudensō Villa and Tanomura Chikuden grave ==
The birthplace of Tanomura Chikuden is located on a small hill in the southern part of the city of Taketa, Ōita, in the foothills of Mount Aso. As the living spaces of the old house and garden have been well preserved, it was designated, along with his grave, as a National Historic Site in 1948. The Chikudensō has a gate in the northwestern corner, and the main building is a two-storey wooden building. The entrance opens to the west and the Japanese garden runs from north to east. In the garden on the east side, there is a supplementary building used as an atelier and a residence for his disciples. Tanomura Chikuden's grave is located approximately 490 meters southwest of the Chikudensō villa. The Chikudensō villa is approximately a 20-minute walk from Bungo-Taketa Station on the JR Kyushu Hōhi Main Line.
