= Tomita Keisen =

Japanese painter (1879–1936)

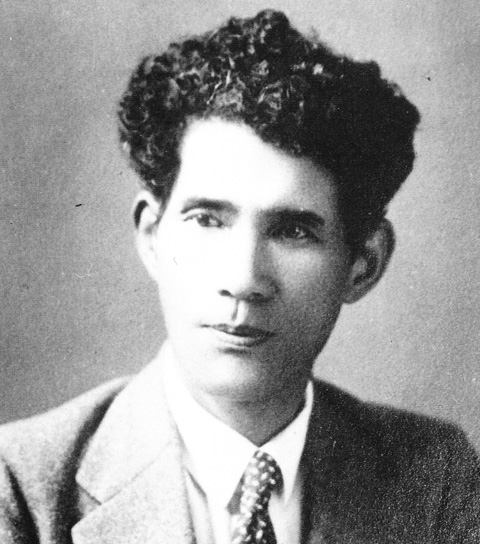
Tomita Keisen

Tomita Keisen (Japanese:冨田 溪仙; 9 December 1879, Fukuoka - 6 July 1936, Kyōto) was a Japanese painter in the nihonga style.

== Life and work ==
He was born to a family of restaurateurs who also made sōmen. His artistic training began with Kinugasa Morimasa (1852-1912), the official painter for the Kuroda clan and a follower of the Kanō school. In 1896, he went to Kyōto to continue his education with Tsuji Kakō, who was a follower of the Shijō school. During this period, he exhibited at the Japan Painting Association and several other venues.

He was deeply interested in both Christianity and Zen Buddhism and travelled about, to China and Okinawa and, notably, to Nara to study the Heian period Buddhist images. In 1915, Yokoyama Taikan invited him to participate in an exhibition held by the Nihon Bijutsuin, after which he was named an associate member of that organization. He always remained more devoted to the prevailing styles in Kyōto, however, and began to show some influence from the nanga style.

He became progressively interested in landscapes and created Eight Views of Saga; a reference to a famous series of classical paintings which featured eight views of various locations. In 1923, through the mediation of novelist Yamanouchi Yoshio, he was introduced to the Ambassador from France, Paul Claudel, who was also a poet. Together, they produced some illustrated collections of poetry.

In 1931, he paid a visit to Berlin to attend the "Ausstellung japanische Malerei". Four years later, he was elected a member of the Japan Art Academy.

== Selected paintings ==
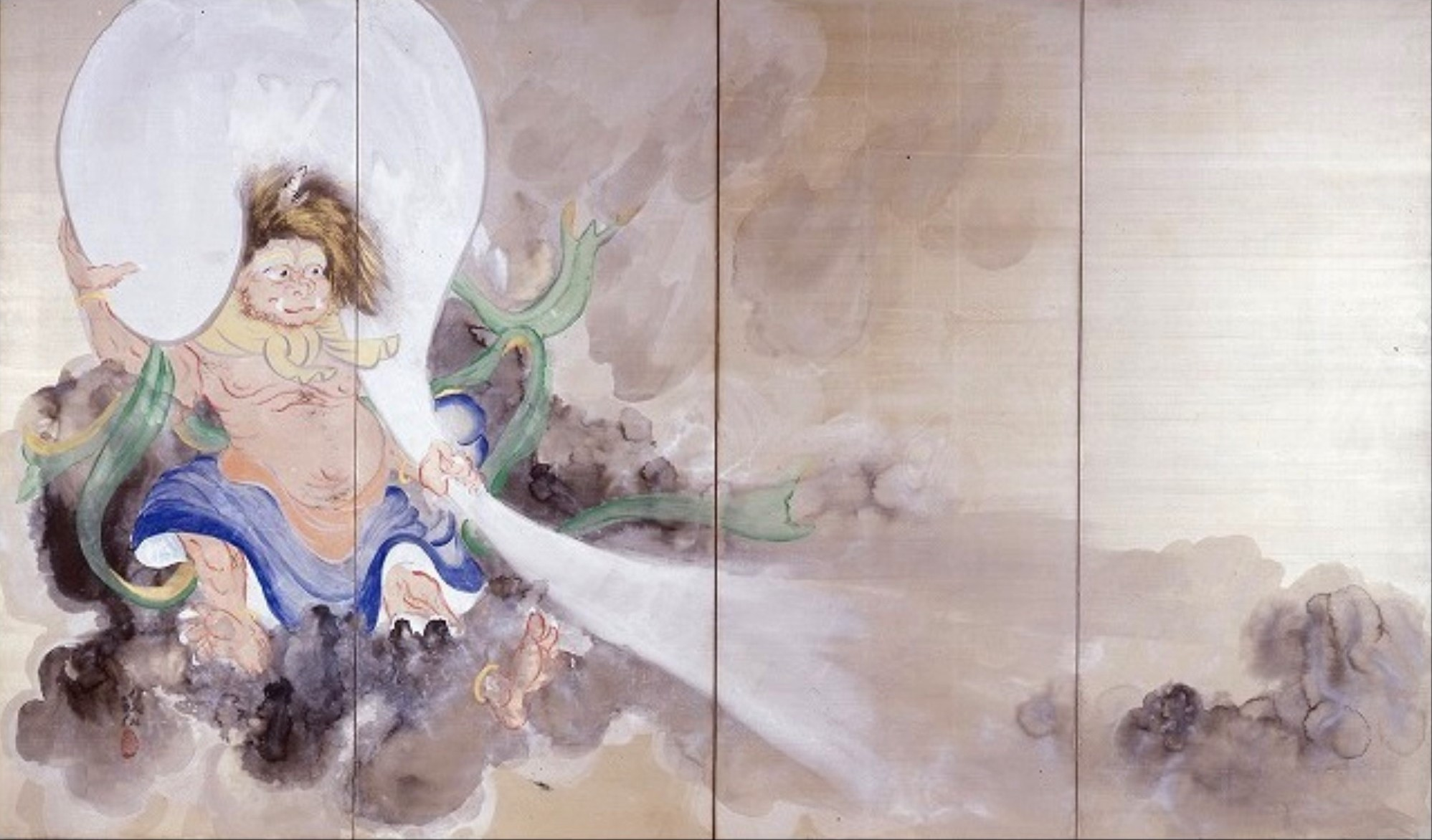
Wind

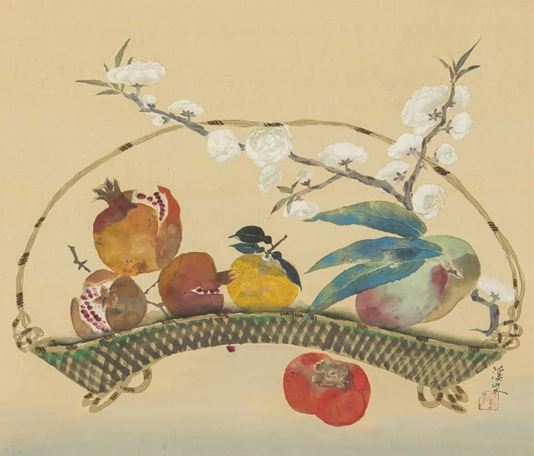
Fruits and Flowers of the Seasons

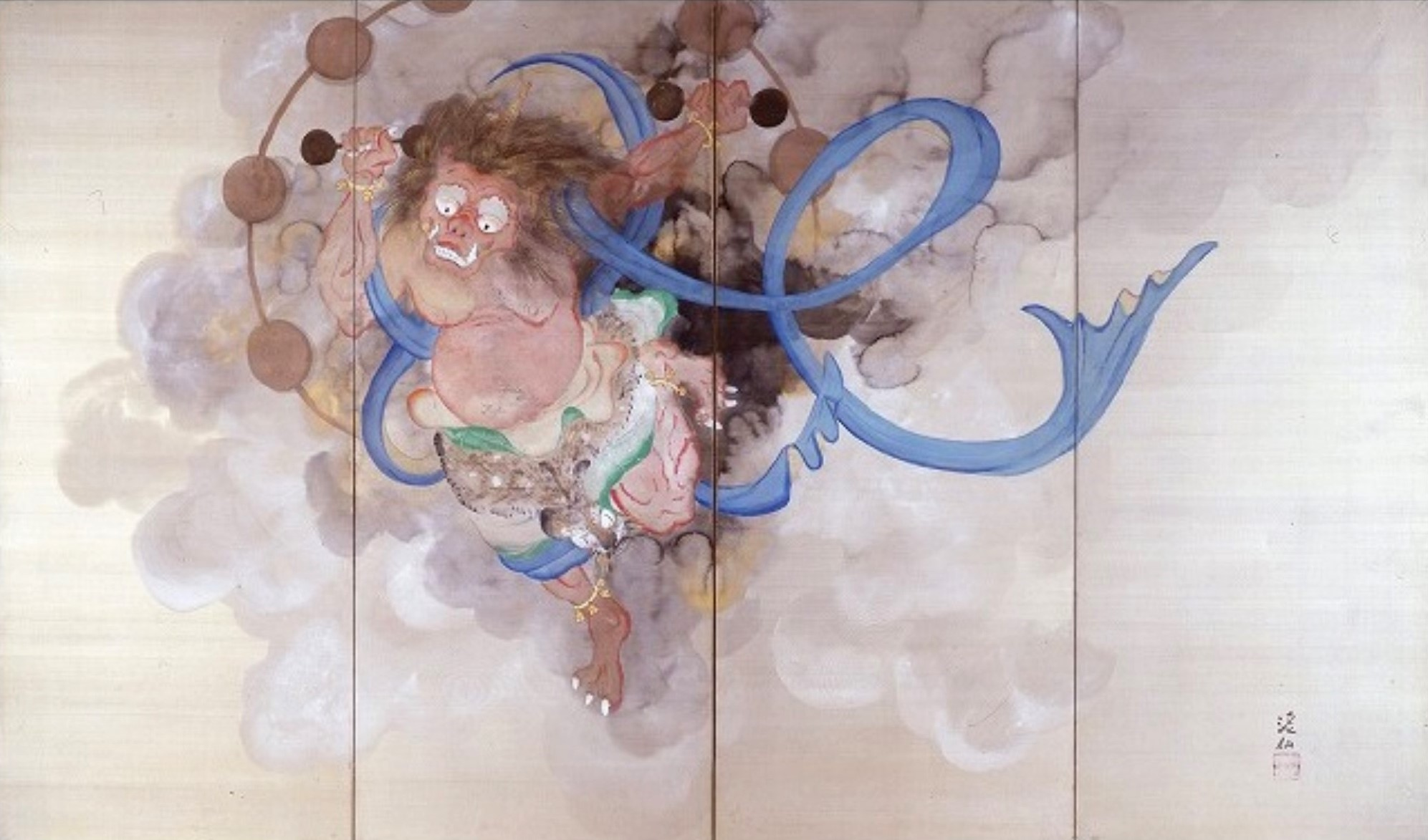
Thunder

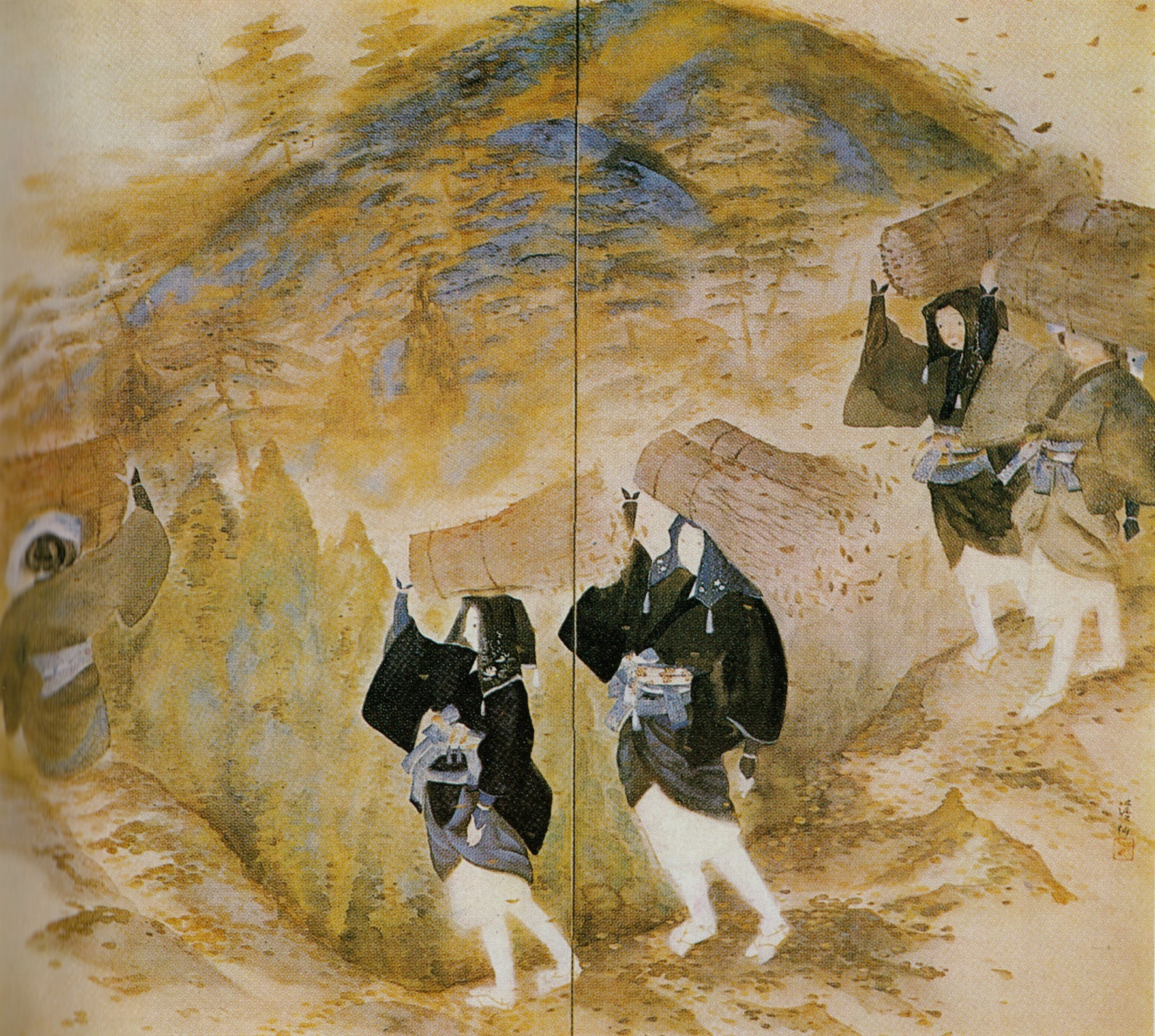
Autumn in Ohara

== Sources ==
- "Tomita Keisen", In: Kyōto no Nihonga 1910–1930. National Museum of Modern Art, Kyoto, 1986. ISBN 4-87642-117-X.
- Laurance P. Roberts: "Tomita Keisen". In: A Dictionary of Japanese Artists. Weatherhill, 1976. ISBN 0-8348-0113-2.
