= Ōita Prefectural Art Museum =

- 大分県立美術館
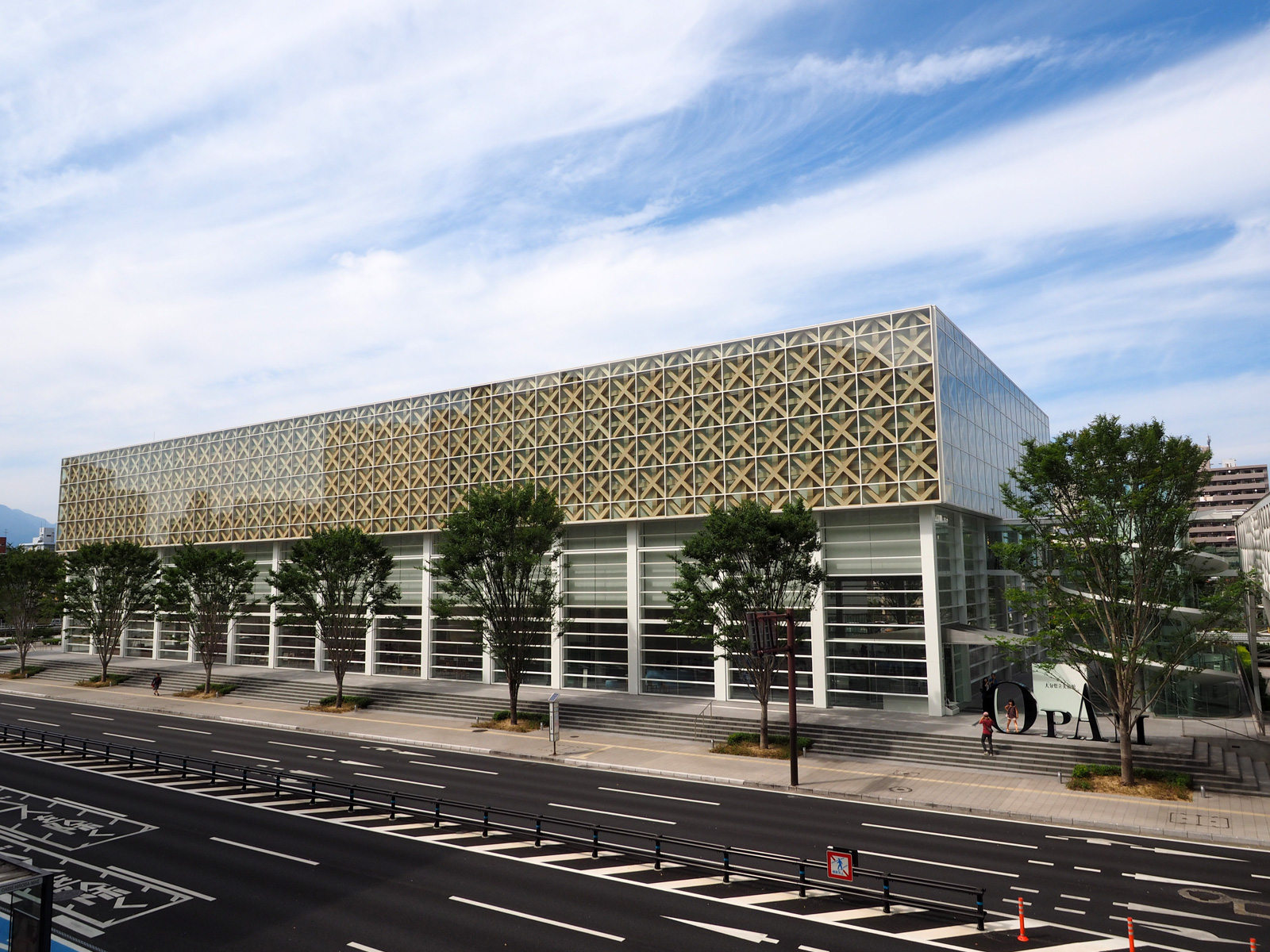
- Ōita Prefectural Art Museum

- Location of the Ōita Prefectural Art Museum in Japan
- Location: 2-1 Kotobuki-machi, Ōita-shi, Ōita Prefecture, Japan
- Coordinates: 33.2394°N 131.6014°E
- Type: Art museum
- Owner: Ōita Prefecture
- Website: http://www.opam.jp/en/

The Ōita Prefectural Art Museum (大分県立美術館, Ōitakenritsu Bijutsukan), also known informally as OpAm, is an art museum and community exhibition venue in Ōita Prefecture, Japan.

The museum is located in the center of the prefectural capital Ōita-shi, a 15-minute walk north-west of Ōita Station.

== Current facilities ==
The museum was opened in April 2015. The new museum building features modern exhibition spaces, artists studios, a café and museum shop. The building was designed by Pritzker Architecture Prize winning architect Shigeru Ban. At the ground level the building features fully retractable glass shutters opening the main internal exhibition space onto an adjacent public plaza.

The building was the recipient of a RIBA International Award for excellence in 2016.

== Collection ==
The museum houses over 5,000 pieces in its permanent collection, focusing on artists connected with Oita. Important local artists in the collection include modern landscape painter Chikuen Tanomura, and contemporary painters Heihachiro Fukuyama and Tatsuo Takayama.

== See also ==
- Prefectural museum

== External websites ==
- Oita Prefectural Art Museum website
