= Okada Beisanjin =

Japanese artist (1744–1820)

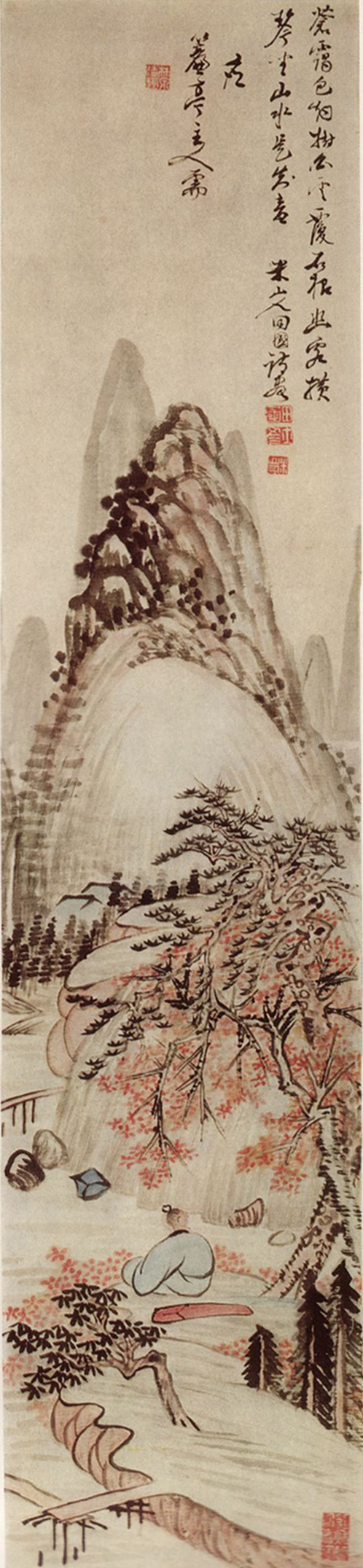
Quiet man and the laid harp

Okada Beisanjin (岡田 米山人; 1744 – September 15, 1820), also known as Hikobe, was a Japanese painter. He is first documented as a rice merchant in Osaka in the 1770s and 1780s. His go (artist's name), Beisanjin, literally meaning a mountain of rice, may either relate to his profession or reflect deference to the Northern Song period (960-1127).

Okada Beisanjin was a notable bunjinga painters. The Japanese term bunjinga refers to a style of painting produced by literati (bunjin). Bunjinga traces its roots to the paintings of Chinese literati of the Song dynasty (960–1267).While Beisanjin employed a variety of styles in his paintings, his later works are characterized by forceful brushstrokes that create unusual forms and give texture to his images.
