= Uragami Gyokudō =

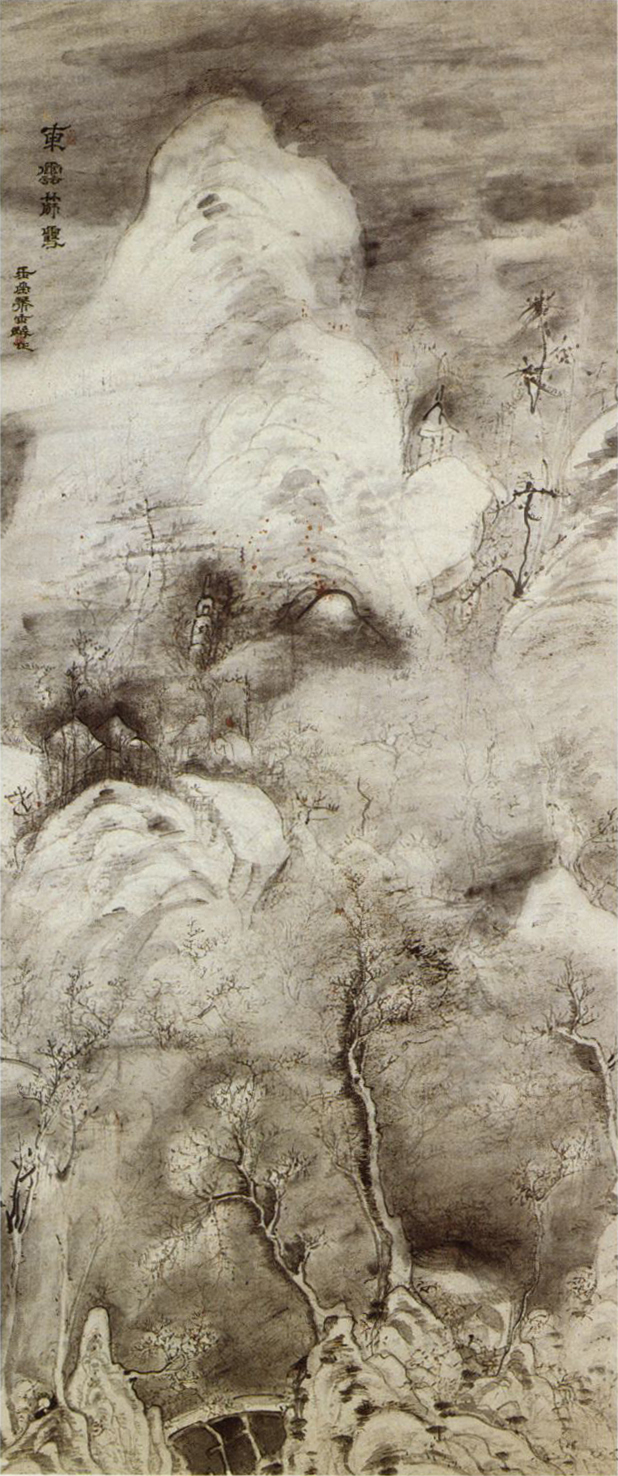
Snow Sifted Through Frozen Clouds Hanging scroll, ink on paper, 133.3 cm × 56.6 cm (52.5 in × 22.3 in) Kawabata Memorial Hall, Kamakura, Kanagawa

Uragami Gyokudō or Urakami Gyokudō (浦上玉堂 1745 - October 10, 1820) was a Japanese musician, painter, poet and calligrapher. He was born in Kamogata, Okayama. In his lifetime, he was best known as a player of the Chinese seven-string zither, the guqin, but people came to appreciate his paintings after his death. His art features strong brushwork, often in patterns of strokes that build up a strong rhythm, and they reflect his musical compositions in relying on a limited number of possibilities that build up to powerful compositions. His Snow Sifted Through Frozen Clouds (紙本墨画凍雪篩雲図 shihon bokuga tōunshisetsuzu) is recognized as a National Treasure.

After working as a samurai for the Ikeda daimyō, he left his position for ideological reasons to devote himself to travel and the arts. He named his sons ""Spring Qin" and "Autumn Qin." Gyokudō was expert in calligraphy, featuring clerical and running scripts, and he was a fine poet in Chinese.

One of his music works, the Gyokudō kinpu 玉堂琴譜, is available online

An excerpt is available Uragami Gyokudō and the chinese zither guqin based on the book Tall Mountains and Flowing Waters; The Arts of Uragami Gyokudō by Stephen Addiss, Univ. of Hawaii Press, 1987, ISBN 0-8248-1039-2.
