= Kanzan Shimomura =

Japanese painter (1873–1930)

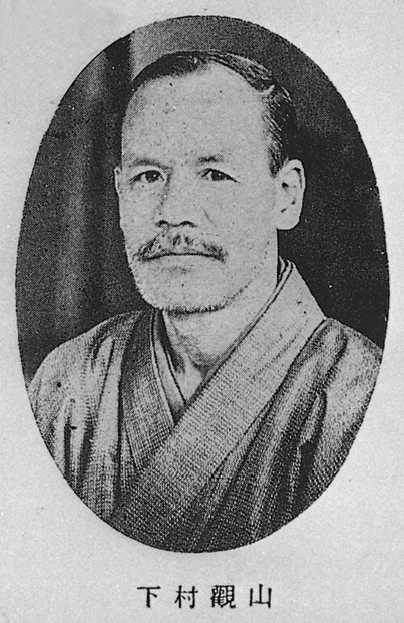
- Kanzan Shimomura
- Born: Seizaburō Shimomura; April 10, 1873; Wakayama, Wakayama, Japan
- Died: May 10, 1930 (aged 57)
- Known for: Painter
- Notable work: Yoroboshi
- Movement: Nihonga

Kanzan Shimomura (下村 観山, Shimomura Kanzan; April 10, 1873 – May 10, 1930) was the pseudonym of a nihonga painter in Meiji through to the early Shōwa period Japan. His real name was Shimomura Seizaburō.

== Biography ==
Kanzan was born in 1873 in Wakayama city, Wakayama Prefecture into a family of hereditary Noh actors.

Having moved to Tokyo at the age of eight, Kanzan studied under Kanō Hōgai, and after Hōgai's death, under Hashimoto Gahō. He graduated first in his class at the Tōkyō Bijutsu Gakkō (the forerunner of the Tokyo National University of Fine Arts and Music), and became a teacher at the same institution in 1894.

When Okakura Tenshin left government service to establish the Japan Fine Arts Academy (Nihon Bijutsuin), Kanzan joined him, together with Yokoyama Taikan and Hishida Shunsō. However, Kanzan returned to his teaching post at the Tokyo Bijutsu Gakkō from 1901–1908, with a hiatus from 1903–1905, when he went to study in England.

From 1914, he helped reestablish the Japan Fine Arts Academy, and in 1917 was appointed a court painter to the Imperial Household Agency. He served as a judge for both the Bunten and the Inten Exhibitions.

In terms of style, Kanzan was influenced by the Rinpa and the Kanō schools, as well as early Buddhist paintings and Tosa school Emakimono. To these elements, he combined the realism developed from his exposure to western art works during his stay in England.

One of his representative works is a byōbu titled Yoroboshi or "The Beggar Monk" was created in 1915 in colored ink and gold leaf on paper. It is currently housed in the Tokyo National Museum, and is registered as an Important Cultural Property by the Agency for Cultural Affairs. The screen depicts a scene from a famous Noh play of the same name. In the scene, blind monk, has been falsely accused of a crime. Disowned by his family he wanders about, living as a vagrant. Although he is now blind, he has become one with the universe and can see all that surrounds him. Kanzan borrowed heavily from Momoyama period and Edo period style and composition, and the work shows a strong Rimpa influence.

== Notable works ==
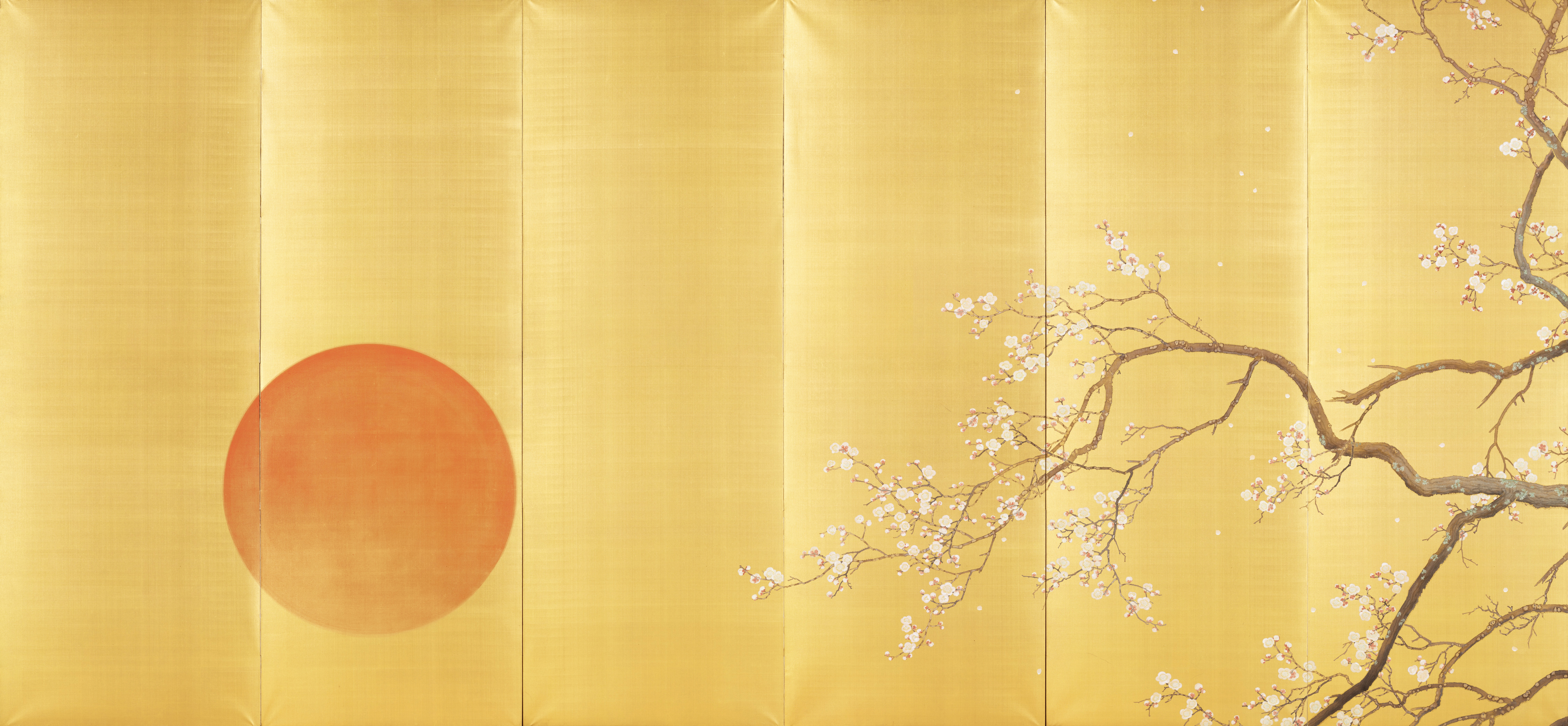
Left panel of the Yorobōshi (Scene from Noh play, 弱法師), 1915, Tokyo National Museum, Important Cultural Property.

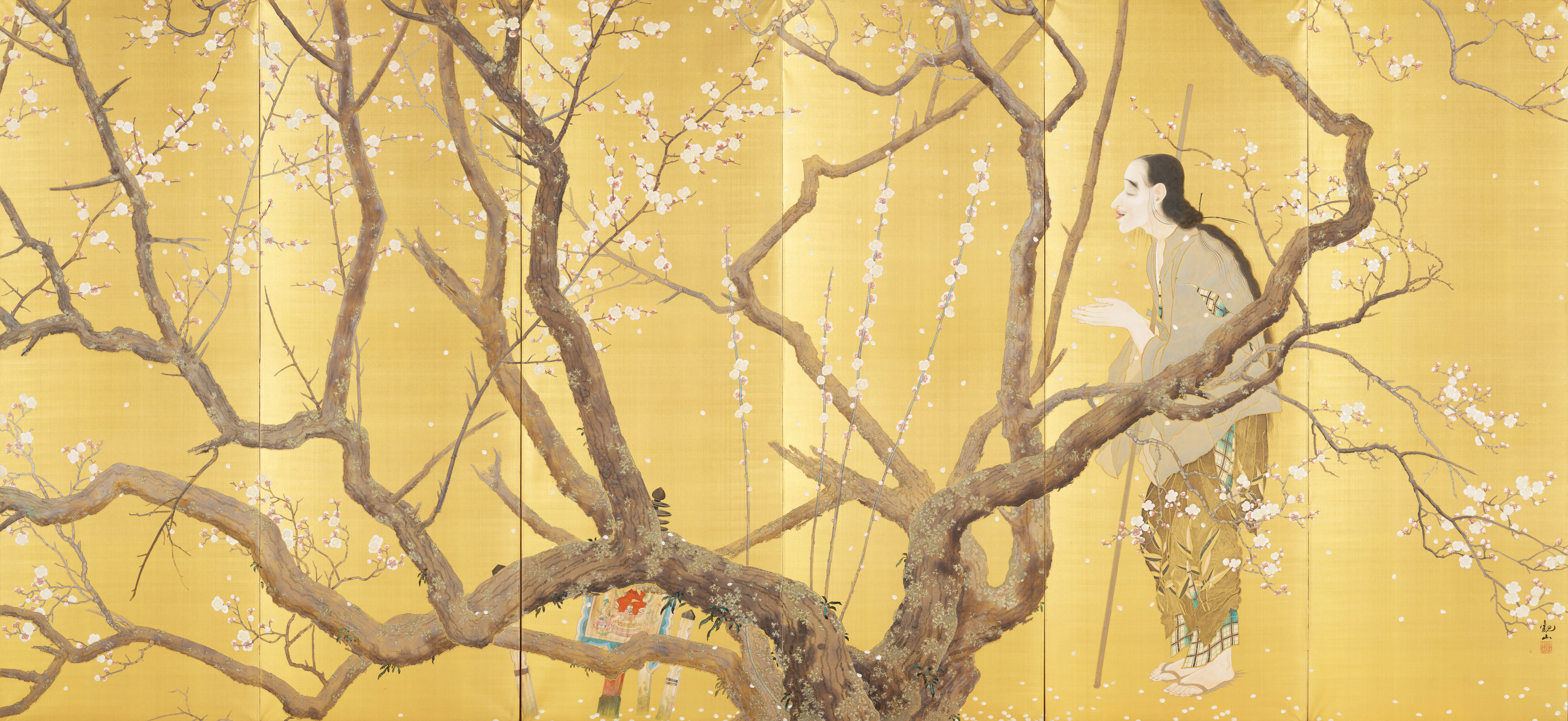
Right panel of the Yorobōshi (Scene from Noh play, 弱法師), 1915, Tokyo National Museum, Important Cultural Property.

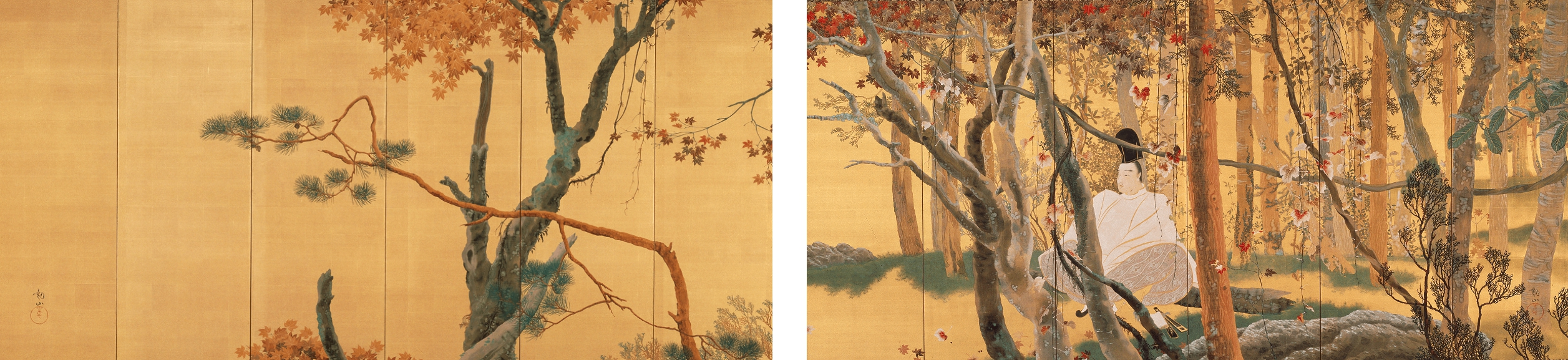
Mount Ogura (小倉山), 1909, Yokohama Museum of Art.

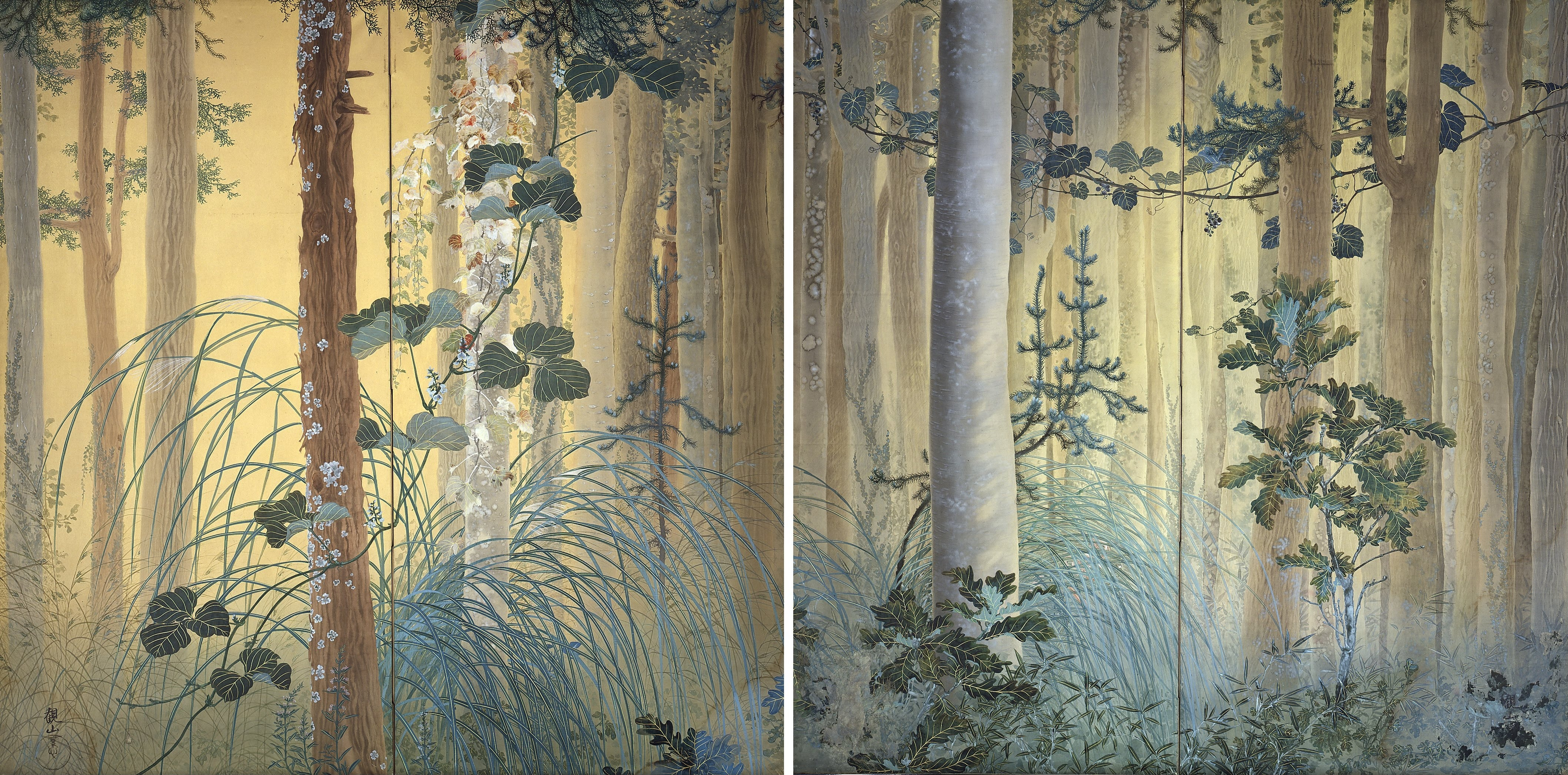
Autumn among Trees (木の間の秋), 1907, National Museum of Modern Art, Tokyo.
- Empress Kōmyō (光明皇后, 1897, Imperial Household Agency)
- Illustrated Scroll of the Asura Realm (修羅道, 1900, Tokyo National Museum)
- 鵜鴎図 (1901, Museum of Modern Art, Shiga)
- Diogenes (ダイオゼニス, 1903, Tokyo National Museum of Modern Art)
- Autumn among Trees (木の間の秋, 1907, Tokyo National Museum of Modern Art)
- Emperor’s Visit to Kenreimon-in, from the Tale of Heike (大原御幸, 1908, Tokyo National Museum of Modern Art)
- Mount Ogura (小倉山, 1909, Yokohama Museum of Art)
- Cormorant (鵜図屏風, 1912, Tokyo National Museum)
- White Fox (白狐, 1914, Tokyo National Museum)
- Scene from Noh Play, Yoroboshi (弱法師, 1915, Tokyo National Museum, Important Cultural Property)
- Spring Rain (春雨, 1916, Tokyo National Museum)
- The Warrior Kusunoki Masashige (楠公, 1921, Tokyo National Museum)
- Album of Felicitous Clouds and Other Sketches of Life (景雲餘彩, 1922, Imperial Household Agency)
