= Kawai Gyokudō =

Japanese painter (1873–1957)

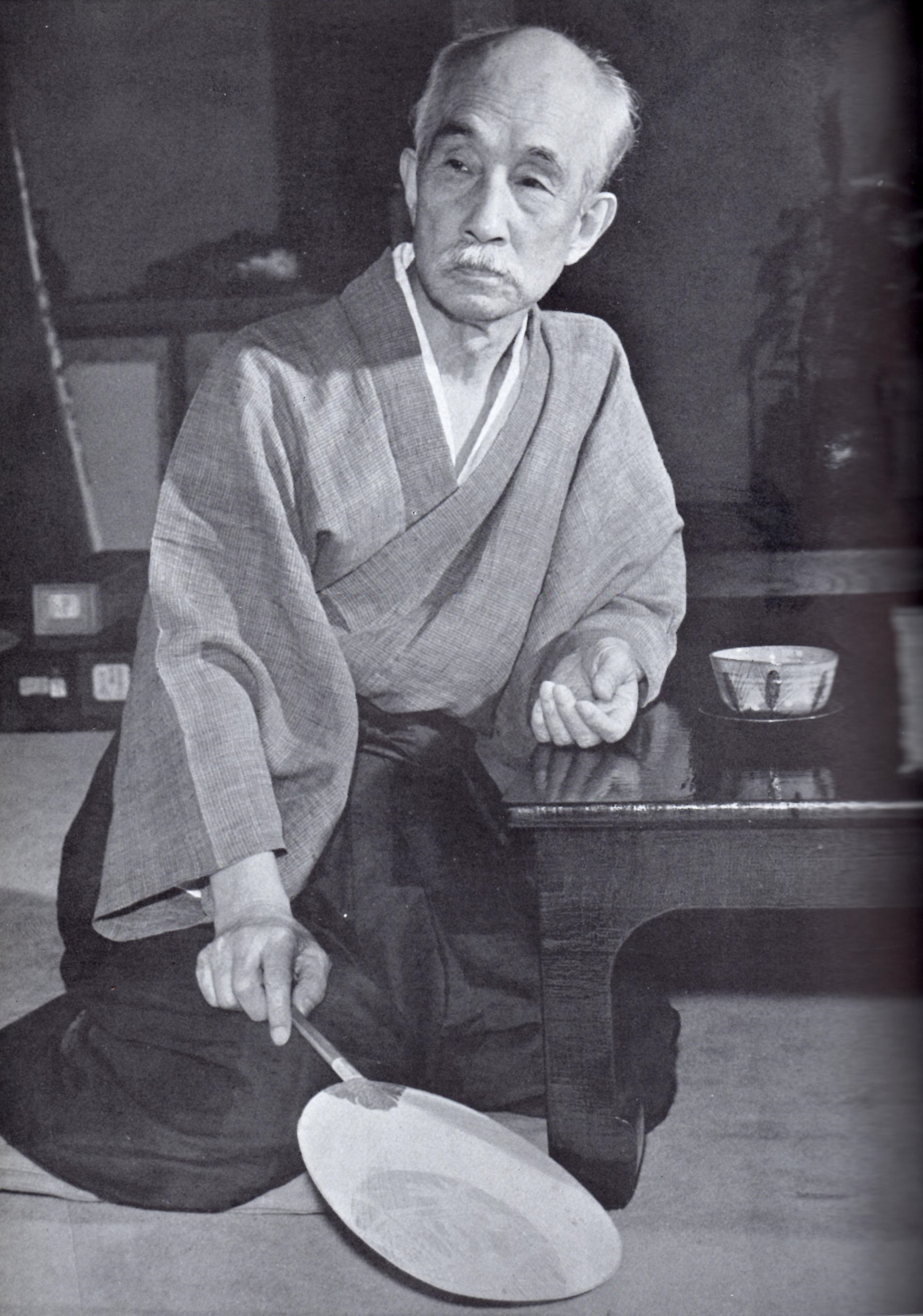
- Gyokudō in 1953
- Born: Kawai Yoshisaburō; November 24, 1873; Ichinomiya, Aichi, Japan
- Died: June 30, 1957 (aged 83); Tokyo, Japan
- Known for: Painter
- Movement: Nihonga
- Awards: Asahi Prize (1940)

Kawai Gyokudō (川合 玉堂; November 24, 1873 – June 30, 1957) was the pseudonym of a Japanese painter in the nihonga school, active from Meiji through Shōwa period Japan. His real name was Kawai Yoshisaburō.

== Biography ==
Gyokudō was born in what is now Ichinomiya city, Aichi Prefecture, as the eldest son of a paper, ink and brush merchant. In the spring of 1887, he graduated from Gifu Jinji Kogakko Elementary School, and in September, with a letter of introduction from Aoki Senbashi, entered the school of Mochizuki Gyokusen in Kyoto, where he was given the name "Gyokusyu". He went to Kyoto in 1887 to study under Kōno Bairei of the Maruyama-Shijo school of painting. In 1890, when he exhibited his work at the Industrial Exposition, he changed his name to "Gyokudo" after Gyokusen's name Tama and his grandfather's name Chikudo. In 1896, he moved to Tokyo and he became the student of Hashimoto Gahō, of the Kanō school. He also studied Western-style painting and developed a highly personal style, especially in the field of landscape painting.

Gyokudō is noted for his polychrome and occasionally monochrome works depicting the mountains and rivers of Japan in the four seasons, with humans and animals shown as part of the natural landscape. Among his representative works are Futsuka zuki (“The New Moon”), Yuku haru (“The Departing Spring”), Mine-no-yu (“Evening at the Mountain Top”), and Bosetsu (“Snow in the Evening”).

In 1898, Gyokudō joined with Okakura Tenshin and Yokoyama Taikan to found the Nihon Bijutsuin (日本美術院, lit. "Japan Visual Arts Academy"). In 1907, Gyokudo was selected as a judge for the first annual Bunten Exhibition. He became a teacher at the Tokyo Bijutsu Gakkō (the forerunner of the Tokyo National University of Fine Arts and Music) in 1919.

Received the Legion of Honor from the French government in 1931 and the Grand Officer Coulonne from the Emperor of Italy in June.

In October 1933, he was awarded the First Class Honorary Medal of the Red Cross by the German government.

In June 1935, he was appointed a member of the Imperial Academy of Fine Arts. Awarded the Order of the Sacred Treasure, 3rd class, in November 1935.

In 1952, Kenso-dong organized a three person exhibition of Gyokudo, Taikan and Ryuko.

In 1957, Gyokudo developed heart asthma disease and recuperated, but the disease worsened again in early June and Gyokudo died on the 30th.

In 1940, he was awarded the Order of Culture by the Government of Japan.

Most of his works are preserved and displayed at the Gyokudo Art Museum, in Ōme, Tokyo.

== Major works ==
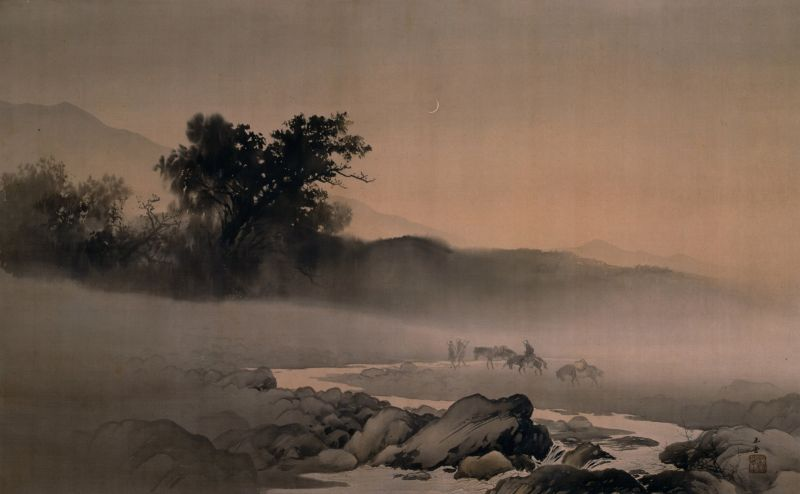
New Moon (二日月, Futsuka zuki), 1907. National Museum of Modern Art, Tokyo.

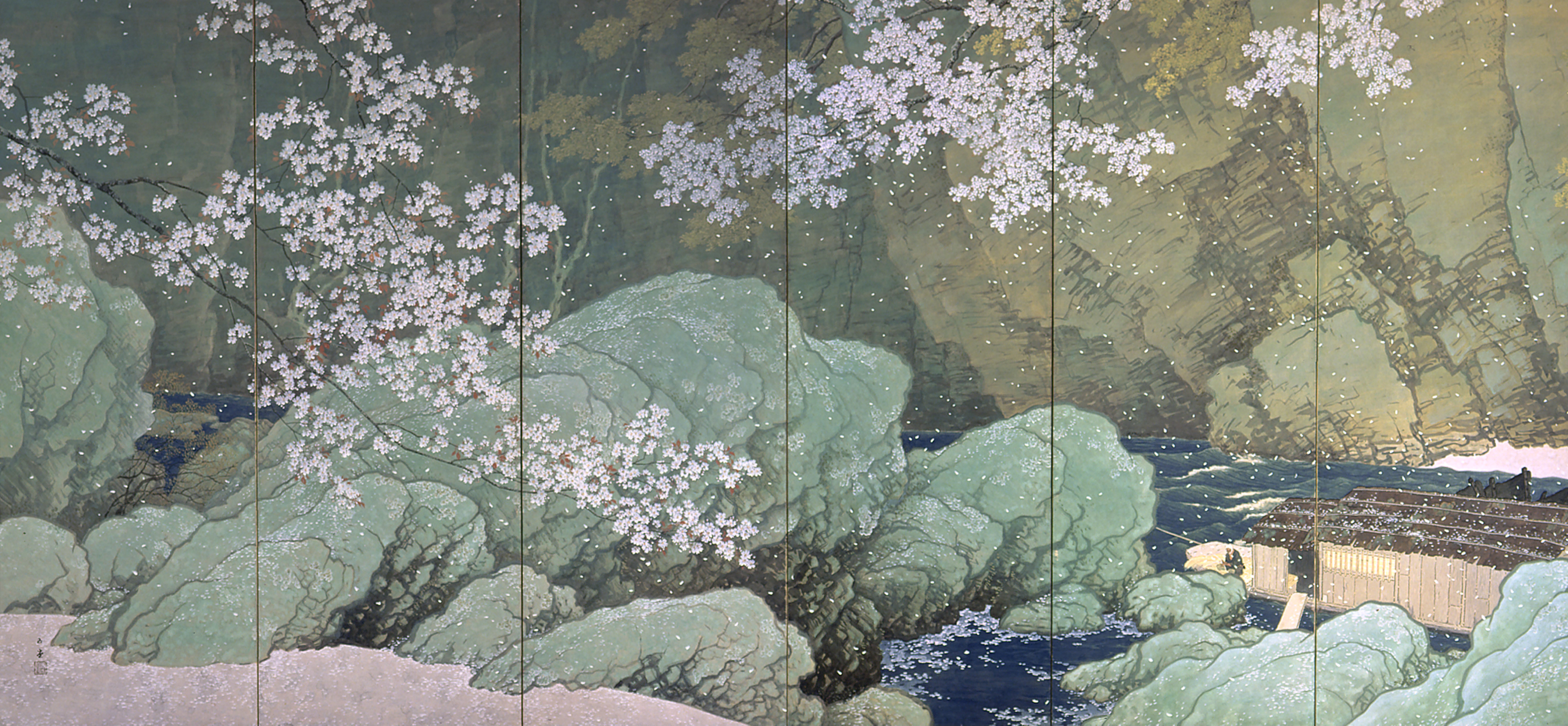
Left panel of the Parting Spring (行く春, Yuku Haru), 1916. Important Cultural Property, National Museum of Modern Art, Tokyo.

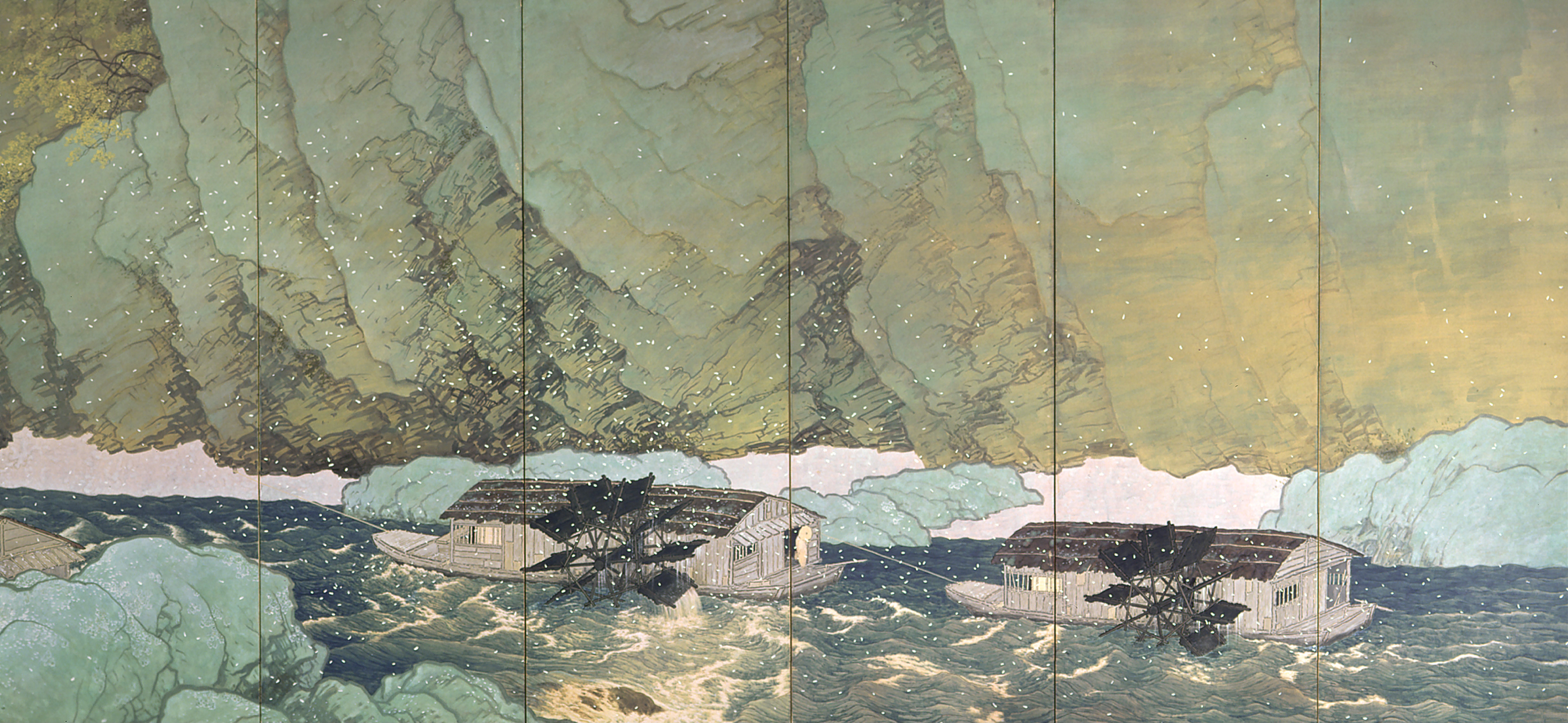
Right panel of the Parting Spring (行く春, Yuku Haru), 1916. Important Cultural Property, National Museum of Modern Art, Tokyo.
- Cormorant Fishing, Color on Silk, Meiji Period, 1895, Yamatane Museum of Art
- Ducks, Color on Silk, Meiji Period, 1897, Tokyo National Museum
- A Night Heron in Summer Rain, Color on Silk, Meiji Period, 1899, Gyokudō Art Museum
- Hills and Streams in Autumn, Color on Silk, Meiji Period, 1906, Yamatane Museum of Art
- Red and White Plum Blossoms, Color on Gold-Leafed Paper, Taishō Period, 1919, Gyokudō Art Museum
- Lingering Snow, Color on Silk, Shōwa Period, 1934, The Japan Art Academy
- Autumn Rain, Color on Silk, Shōwa Period, 1940, National Museum of Modern Art, Tokyo
- After a Mountain Shower, Color on Silk, Shōwa Period, 1943, Yamatane Museum of Art
- Young Ladies Planting Rice, Color on Silk, Shōwa Period, 1945, Yamatane Museum of Art
- A Lady Arranging Flowers, Color on Paper, Shōwa Period, 1929, Gyokudō Art Museum
- A Pair of Cranes on a Pine, Color on Silk, Shōwa Period, 1942, Yamatane Museum of Art
- Bear, Color on Paper, Shōwa Period, 1946, Gyokudō Art Museum
