= Hashimoto Gahō =

Japanese painter

Hashimoto Gaho
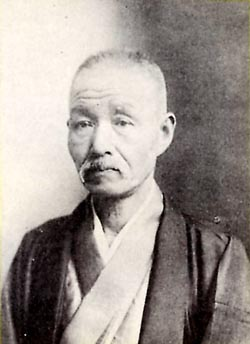
- Born: August 21, 1835; Tokyo
- Died: January 13, 1908 (aged 72); Tokyo, Japan
- Occupation: Japanese painter

Hashimoto Gahō (橋本 雅邦; Japanese pronunciation: [ha.ɕi.mo.to (|) ɡaꜜ.hoː], August 21, 1835 – January 13, 1908) was a Japanese painter, one of the last to paint in the style of the Kanō school. He is also considered the founder of Nihonga and was an educator who trained many Nihonga painters. Many of the painters recognized in later generations as great Nihonga masters, such as Yokoyama Taikan, Shimomura Kanzan, Hishida Shunsō and Kawai Gyokudō, were his students. He was one of the first five painters to be appointed as an Imperial Household Artist and was one of the most authoritative painters in Japan at that time.

== Biography ==
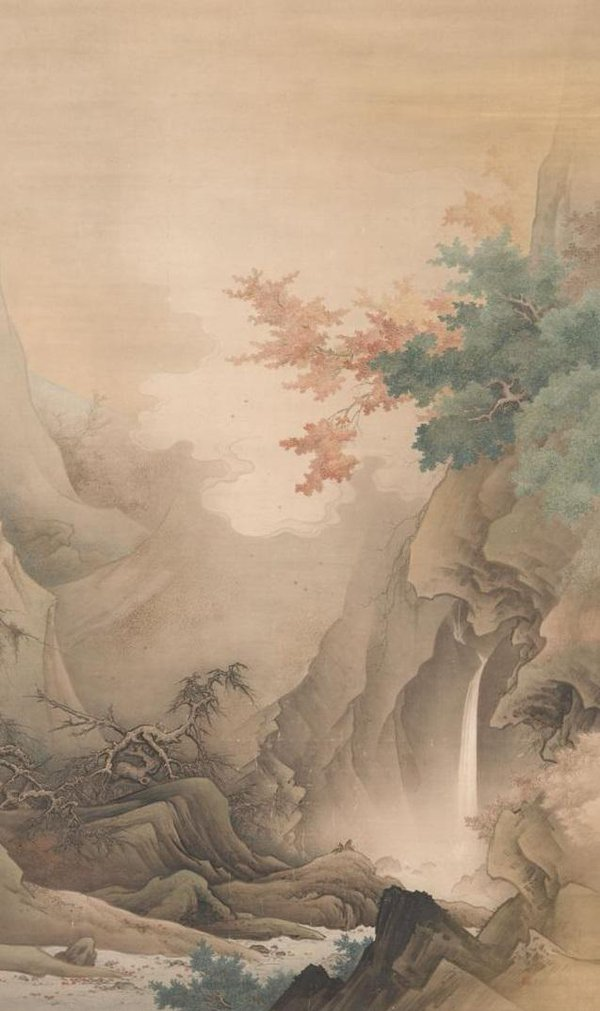
White Clouds and Autumn Leaves (白雲紅樹). 1890, Important Cultural Property. Collection of Tokyo University of the Arts

Born in Edo, he was a son of a painter. After studying under his father, he continued his studies with Kanō Shōsen'in, and was also influenced by the work of Kanō Hōgai. He created many works in the traditional style of the Kanō school, employing color and gold, or otherwise utilizing monochrome black ink. Although his paintings are predominantly traditional, employing traditional methods and depicting traditional subjects, Gahō, like Kanō Hōgai, also incorporated elements of Western art. Brushstrokes, various types of detailing, and particularly attempts at proper depiction of perspective are evident in Gahō's paintings and in many others of this period.

His talent led him to become a studio director at the age of 22 and he was placed in charge of his master's school. Due to the political and economic upheavals surrounding the Meiji Restoration, he was compelled to seek income beyond selling fine art. He produced maps for the Naval Academy, painted on fans exported to China, and utilized his skills in various other ways to earn a living.

Following a revival of interest in Japanese painting during the 1880s, he twice won a prize at the government-sponsored picture exhibitions which led him to become famous. Gahō was invited in 1884, by Okakura Kakuzō, to become the chief professor of painting at the Tōkyō Bijutsu Gakkō (東京美術学校, now the Tokyo National University of Fine Arts and Music) which would open five years later. His students included Kawai Gyokudō and Yokoyama Taikan who would become future masters of Japanese painting. In 1898, Gahō joined Okakura in leaving the Bijutsu Gakkō, and founding the Japan Fine Arts Academy (日本美術院, Nihon Bijutsuin). He would teach there until his death in 1908.

As a result of his position as chief painting professor, Gahō had a number of important pupils, including Yokoyama Taikan and Kawai Gyokudō.

== Works ==
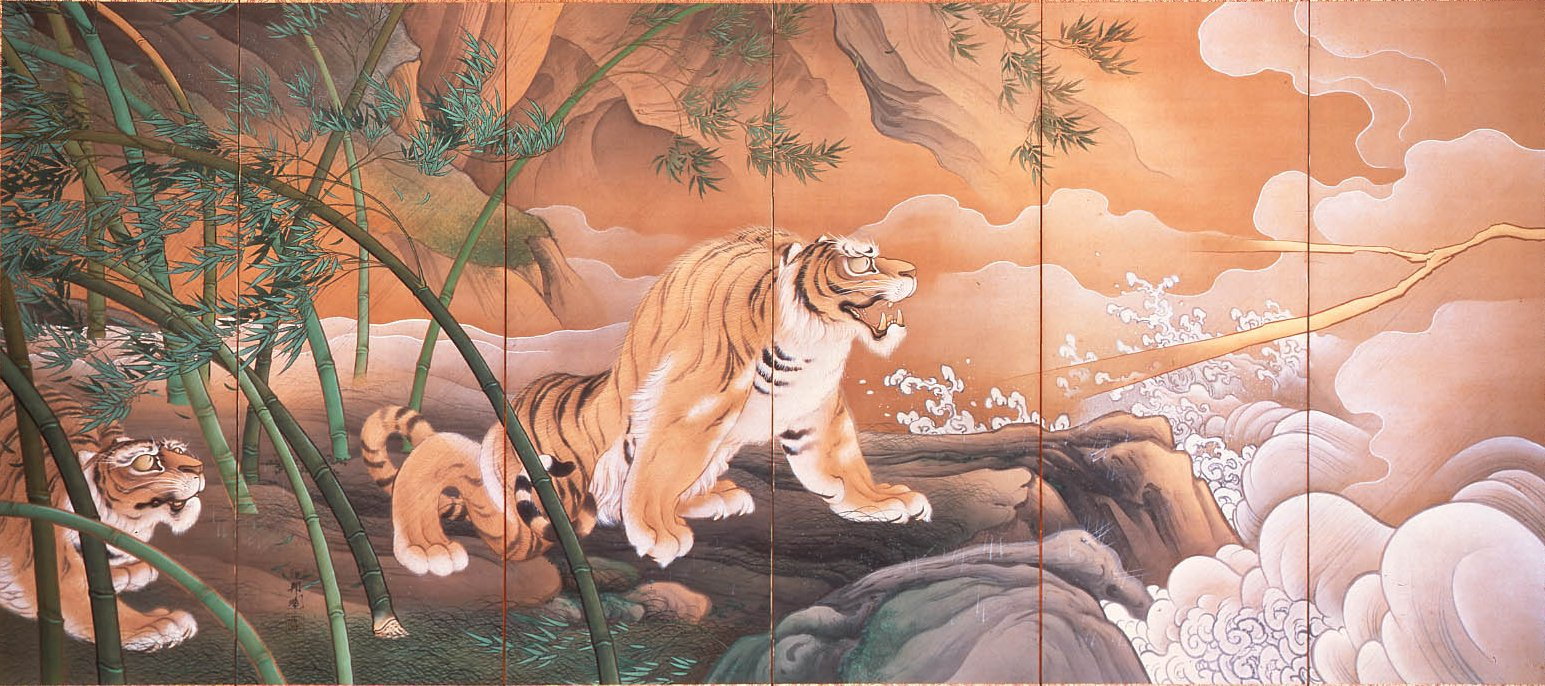
Folding screen Dragon and tiger (竜虎図) left side, 1895. Important Cultural Property. Seikadō Bunko Art Museum

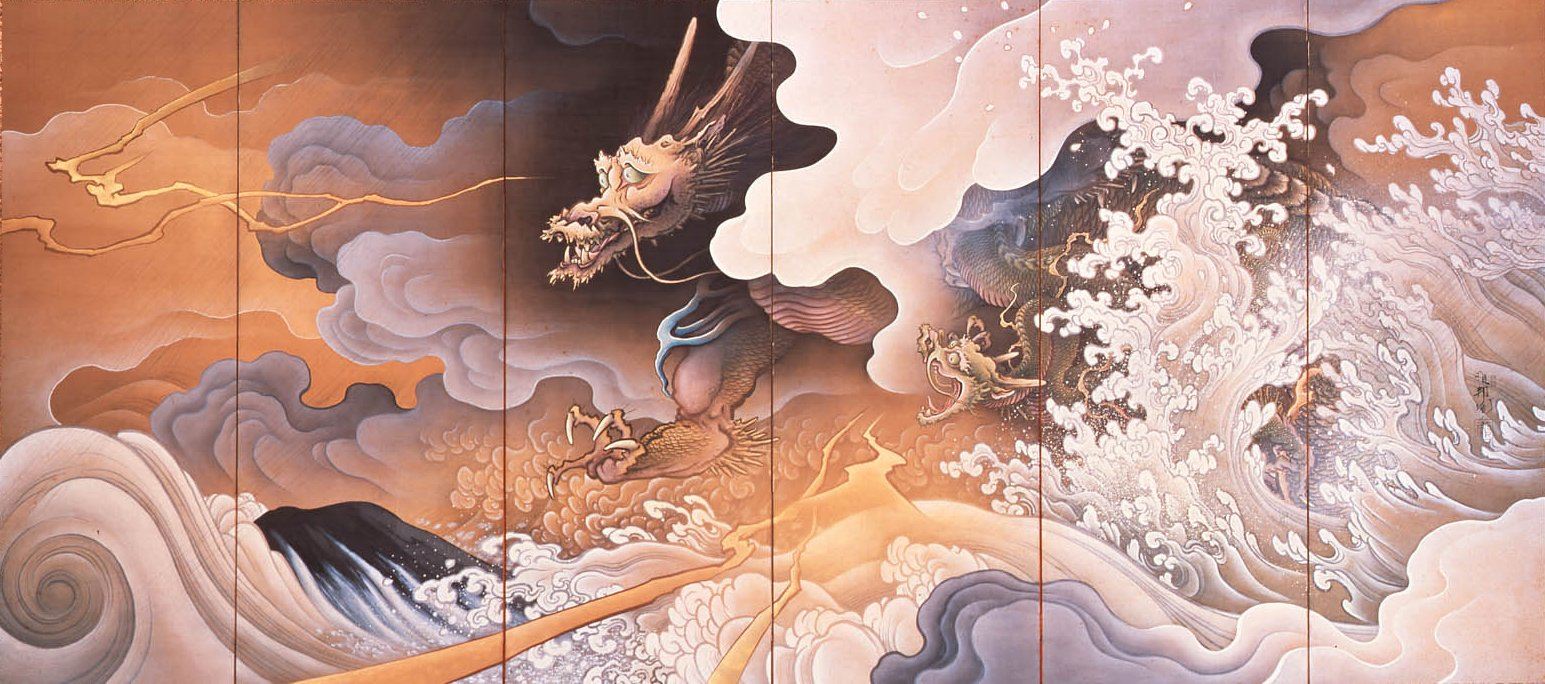
Folding screen Dragon and tiger right side, 1895. Important Cultural Property. Seikadō Bunko Art Museum

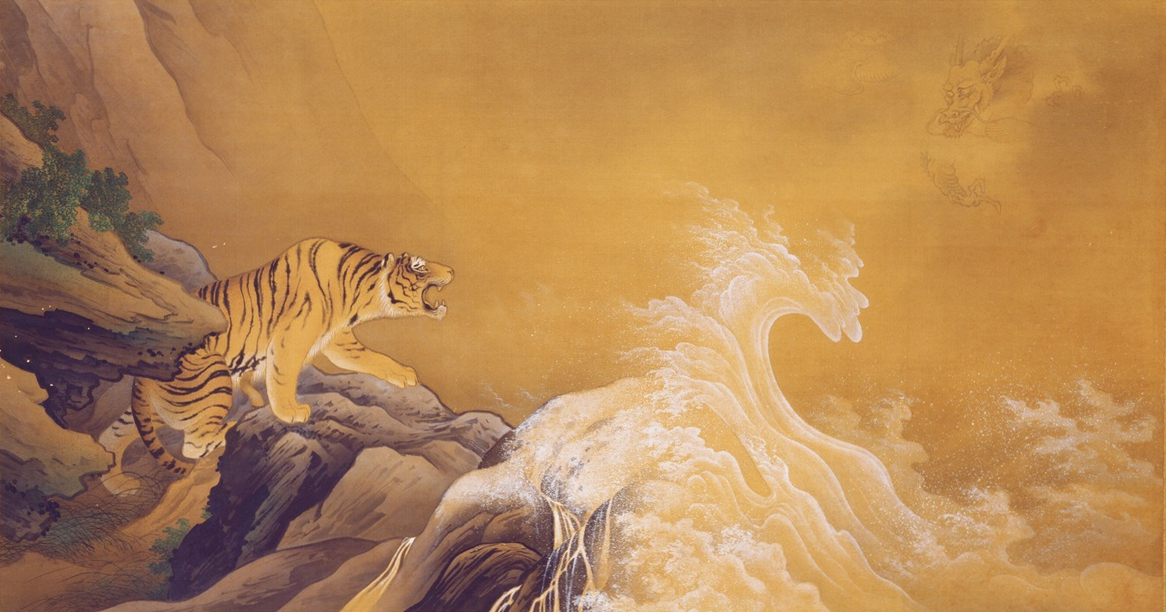
Dragon against tiger. Colour on silk, 1899. Museum of the Imperial Collections
