= Hishida Shunsō =

Japanese painter (1874–1911)

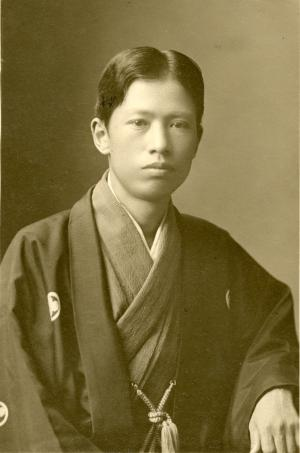
- Born: Hishida Miyoji; September 21, 1874; Iida, Japan
- Died: September 16, 1911 (aged 36); Tokyo, Japan
- Known for: Painting
- Movement: Nihonga
- Awards: Order of Culture

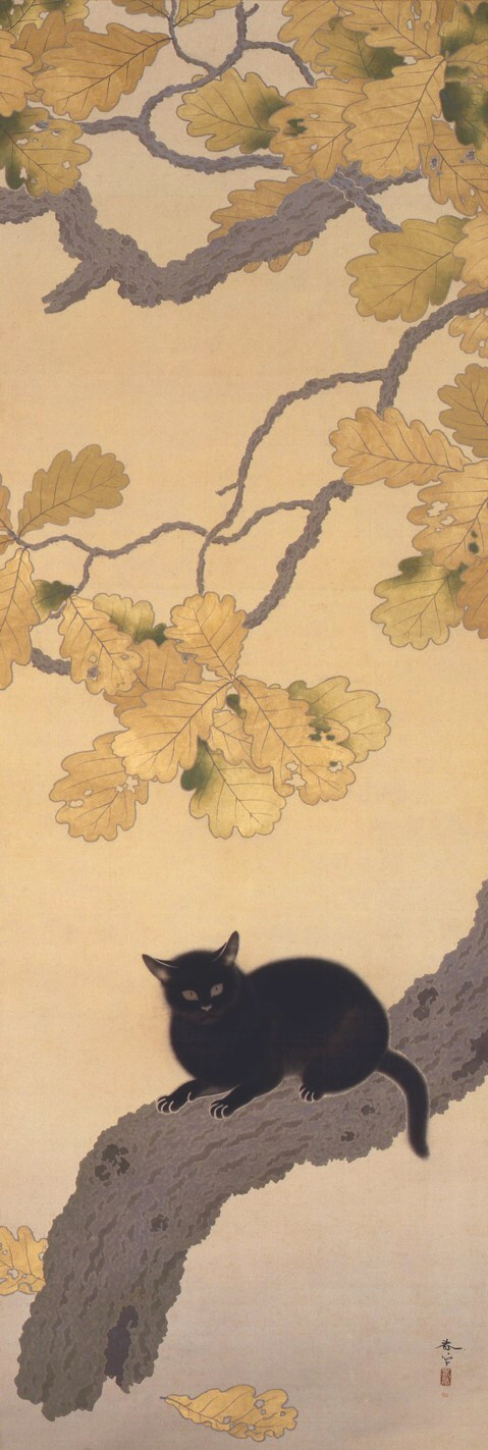
Black Cat (黒き猫), 1910, Important Cultural Property.

Hishida Shunsō (菱田 春草; September 21, 1874 – September 16, 1911) was the pseudonym of a Japanese painter from the Meiji period. One of Okakura Tenshin's pupils along with Yokoyama Taikan and Shimomura Kanzan, he played a role in the Meiji era innovation of Nihonga. His real name was Hishida Miyoji. He was also known for his numerous paintings of cats.

== Biography ==
Shunsō was born in 1874 in what is now part of Iida city in Nagano Prefecture. In 1889 he moved to Tokyo to study under Kanō school artist Yuki Masaaki (1834–1904). The following year, he enrolled at the Tōkyō Bijutsu Gakkō (the forerunner of the Tokyo National University of Fine Arts and Music). Shunsō was one year junior to his colleagues Yokoyama Taikan and Shimomura Kanzan; his teacher was Hashimoto Gahō. Shunsō, Taikan and Kanzan were heavily influenced by Okakura Tenshin and Ernest Fenollosa during their time at the Tōkyō Bijutsu Gakkō.

After graduation, Shunsō was commissioned by the Imperial Household Museum (now the Tokyo National Museum) to copy important religious paintings at Buddhist temples in Kyoto and Nara, and he also became a teacher at the Tōkyō Bijutsu Gakkō (present-day Tokyo University of the Arts)). In 1898, he joined Okakura Tenshin in establishing the Nihon Bijutsuin. From 1903 to 1905, he traveled extensively overseas, holding exhibitions of his works in India, the United States and Europe.

After his return to Japan, Shunsō successfully competed in many national exhibitions in Japan, including the government-sponsored Bunten.

Shunsō developed a new painting method, derogatorily named by his contemporaries as moro-tai (vague style). This new method used a gradation of colors to replace the line drawings that characterized traditional Japanese-style painting. This new style, however, gained little support from Shunsō's contemporaries and was severely criticized by art critics. Shunsō came to realize that while moro-tai was effective in depicting such scenes as morning mist and evening glow, its color gradation technique proved good only for those limited motifs. Shunsō began integrating his original moro-tai with line drawing to overcome this disadvantage, and his later works exhibit a new style which came to typify the Nihonga genre, distinguishing it from the more restrictive styles of traditional Japanese-style painting.

In his final years, Shunsō suffered from renal, or kidney disease. Driven by fear of blindness, Shunsō painted frantically whenever his illness entered a state of remission. In 1909, his work Ochiba won the highest award at the third Bunten Exhibition. It is now designated an Important Cultural Property by the Japanese government's Agency for Cultural Affairs and is now in the collection of the Eisei Bunko Museum, Tokyo. His representative work "Ochiba" is based on the motif of a thicket of trees around Yoyogi, Tokyo, Japan, which was still a suburb at the time. His work Black Cat (1910) has also been designated an Important Cultural Property. In 1911, he died of kidney disease (nephritis) just before his 37th birthday.

A large retrospective exhibition of his work was held at the National Museum of Modern Art, Tokyo’s Art Museum Special Gallery in 2014.

== Philately ==
One of Hishida Shunsō's works has been selected as the subject of a commemorative postage stamps by the Japanese government:

- 1979: Black Cat, as part of the Modern Art Series

In the year 1951, Hishida Shunsō himself was the subject of a commemorative postage stamp under the Cultural Leaders Series by Japan Post.

== Works ==
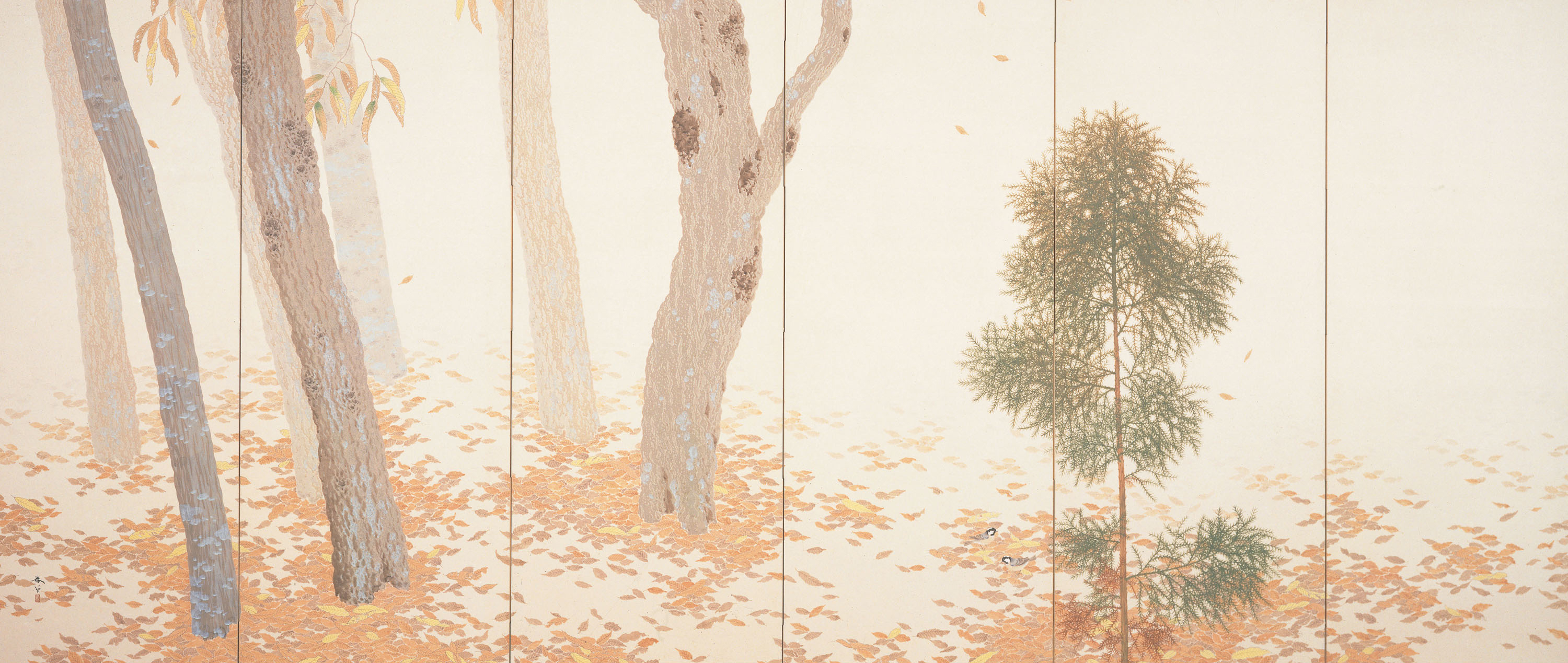
Left panel of the Fallen Leaves (落葉), 1909. Important Cultural Property.

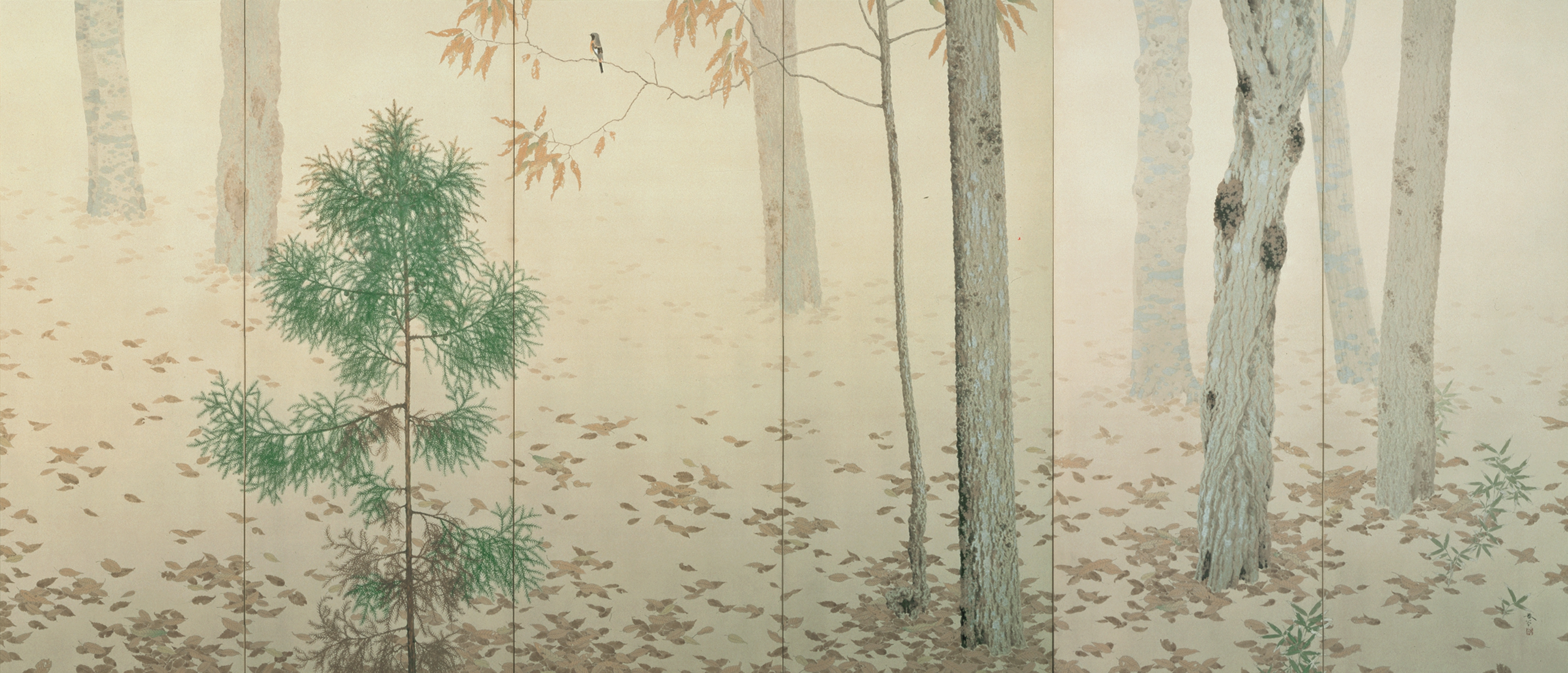
Right panel of the Fallen Leaves (落葉), 1909. Important Cultural Property.

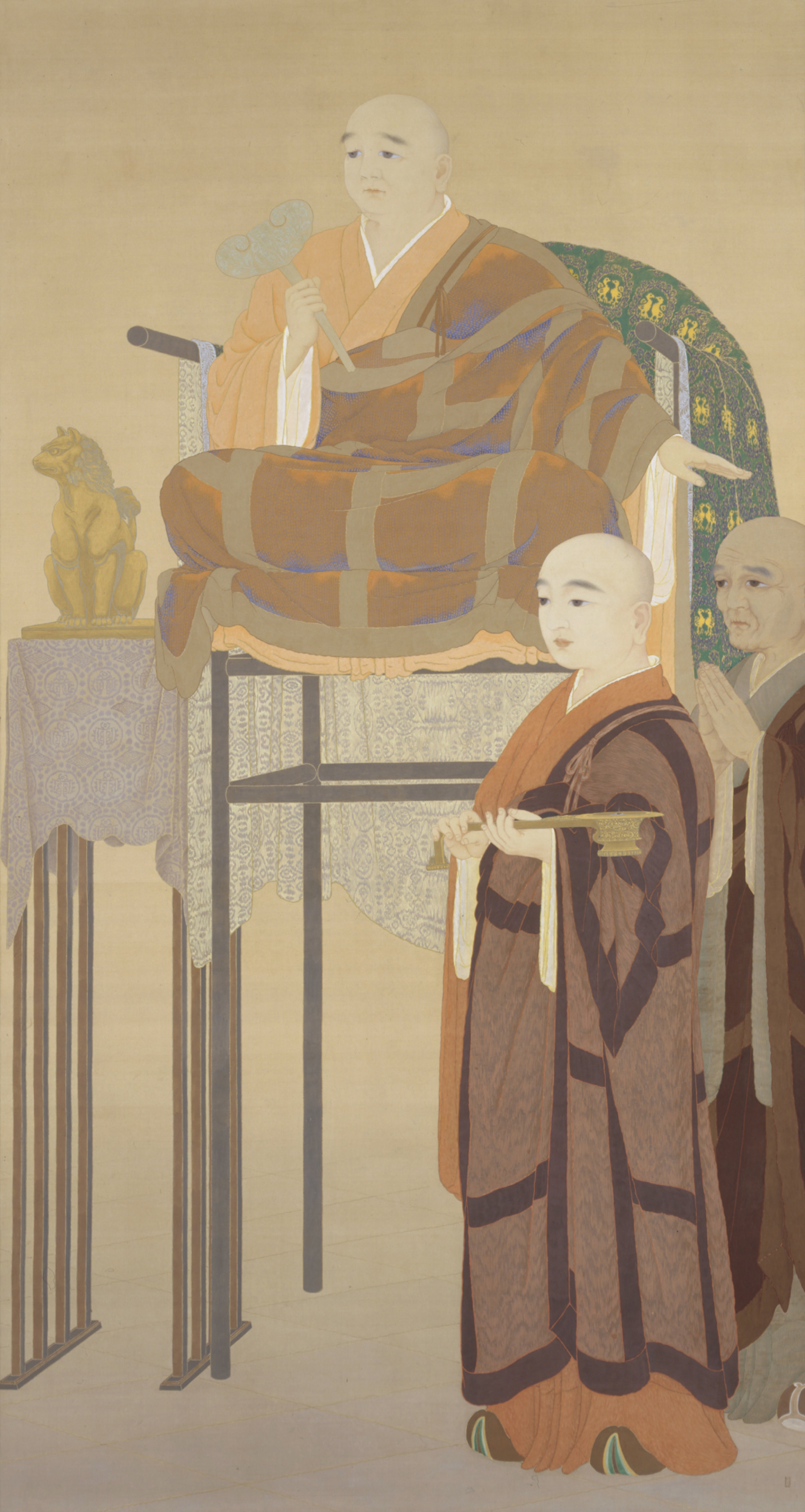
Bodhisattva Kenshu (賢首菩薩), 1907. Important Cultural Property.
- Widow and Orphan (寡婦と孤児, 1895, Tokyo University of the Arts)
- Reflection in the Water (水鏡, 1897, Tokyo University of the Arts)
- Six Immortal Poets (六歌仙, 1899, property of Eisei Bunko, entrusted to Kumamoto Prefectural Museum of Art)
- Autumn Landscape (秋景 渓山紅葉, 1899, Shimane Art Museum)
- Chrysanthemum Boy (菊慈童, 1900, Iida City Museum)
- Moon after The Snow (雪後の月, 1902, Shiga Museum of Art)
- Wong Zhaojun (王昭君, 1902, property of Zenpo-ji Temple (ja), entrusted to National Museum of Modern Art, Tokyo, Important Cultural Property)
- Cat and Plum Blossoms (猫梅, 1906, Adachi Museum of Art)
- Bodhisattva Kenshu (賢首菩薩, 1907, National Museum of Modern Art, Tokyo, Important Cultural Property)
- Fallen Leaves (落葉, 1909, property of Eisei Bunko, entrusted to Kumamoto Prefectural Museum of Art, Important Cultural Property)
- Black Cat (黒き猫, 1910, property of Eisei Bunko, entrusted to Kumamoto Prefectural Museum of Art, Important Cultural Property)
