= Kanō Hideyori =

Japanese painter

Maple Viewers

Kanō Hideyori (狩野秀頼) was a Japanese painter of the Kanō school in Kyoto. His date of birth and death are unknown, however he was active in the mid-16th century, the beginning of the Momoyama period (1573–1603). Not much is known about him, but he was probably either the son or grandson of Kano Motonobu.

His style has been described as "adopting the superficial qualities of yamato-e, being in spirit thoroughly Chinese". This being said, he painted Maple Viewers either a pioneering work that predated ukiyo-e, or one of the earliest examples of the movement.
