= Kanō Hōgai =

Japanese artist

- 狩野芳崖
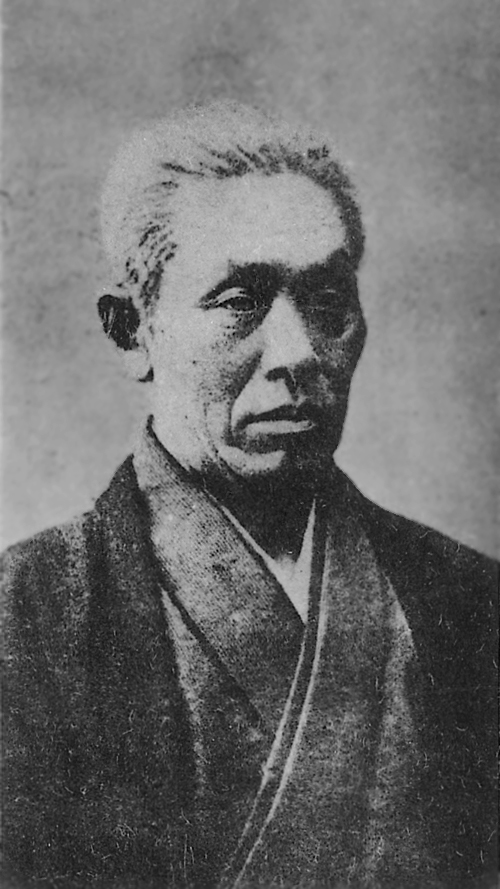
- Kanō Hōgai
- Born: February 27, 1828; Chōfu Domain in modern day Yamaguchi Prefecture
- Died: October 5, 1888 (aged 60); Tokyo

Kanō Hōgai (狩野 芳崖; February 27, 1828 – October 5, 1888) was a Japanese painter of the Kanō school.

== Early life ==
Kanō Hōgai was born on February 27, 1828 and died on October 5, 1888 as the son of the local daimyō's chief painter, serving the Chōfu Clan named Kanō Seikō. Hōgai was sent to Edo in 1846 to study at the Kobikichō studio under the teacher Kanō Shōsen'in. He stayed there for ten years and studied under Kanō Shōsen'in and other prominent artists of the time. In addition to this training he also studied alongside fellow Japanese painter Hashimoto Gahō, both work recognized early on for their talent, which formed a lifelong partnership of innovative work.

== Post restoration struggles ==
After the Meiji restoration of 1868, the fall of the feudal domains ended the patronage system which had provided financial support to Kanō school artists for hundreds of years.

In the 1870s, Hōgai had suffered from financial struggles that forced him to indulge in activities outside of his artistic work, such as iron casting and land reclamation.

Following this time of struggle Hōgai's re-emergence into the public art space took place in the late 1870s and early 1880s by his submission of art works to government-sponsored domestic industrial and art exhibitions.

== Style and technique ==
Hōgai created a unique visual language that combined the elements of traditional brush painting and line composition in Kanō-style painting with the western idea of linear and aerial perspective (chiaroscuro).

The Nihonga Art Aesthetics Foundation was critical in helping set up the aesthetic principles of modern Nihonga art through the application of traditional pigments and silk canvases to achieve modern depth in space and smooth color transition.

== Most notable work ==
The painting called Hibo Kannon by Kanō Hōgai is one of his most notable works. Created using ink, mineral pigments, and gold leaf on silk, shows the Bodhisattva Kannon standing on top of a cloud in the top part of the sky, looking downward as a drop of water falls from an object toward a floating infant enclosed in a radiant sphere of light.

Kannon is rendered with typical motherly traits as part of the iconographic innovation carried out by Hōgai. As observed by art historians, this innovation was drawn from the depiction of the Virgin Mary and Child in Western art, known as the Madonna. Hōgai combined elements of Western depth and three-dimensional rendering with Eastern ink painting technique. In contrast to earlier Buddhist paintings made for religious purposes are different, Hibo Kannon by Hogai is a painting that was designed as a show piece for display in exhibitions.

This was the last piece created by Hōgai prior to his death in October 1888. Currently, the 1888 copy housed in the Tokoyo University of the Arts in the University Art Museum is a Japanese important cultural object.

== Other notable works ==
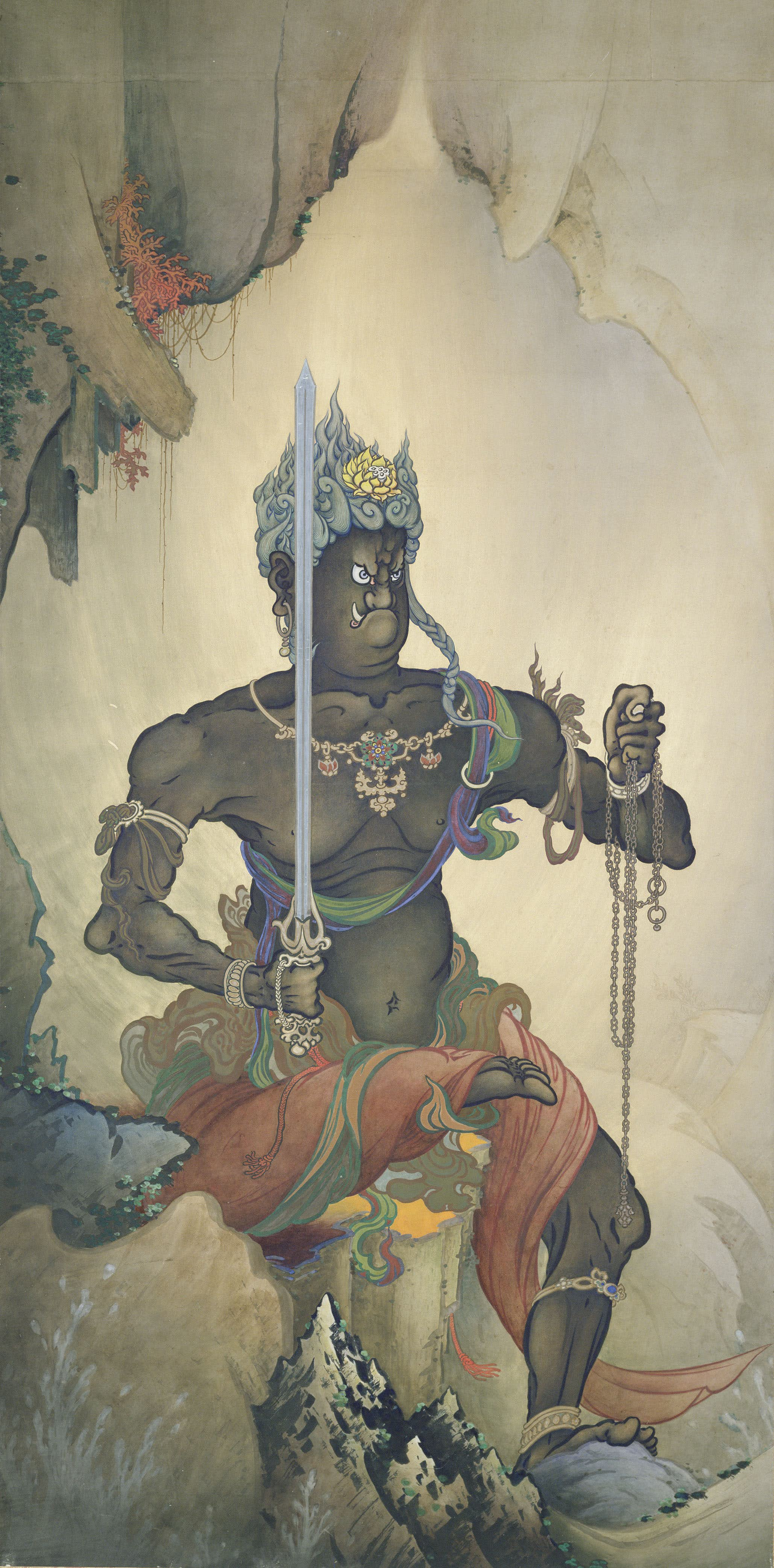
Fudō Myōō by Kanō Hōgai

"Fudō Myōō" by Kanō Hōgai reimagines the fierce guardian deity of Esoteric Buddhism, Acala (Fudō Myōō), through the use of anatomical accuracy, musculature, and dramatic lighting techniques common in western art. This piece is currently preserved at the Tokyo University of the Arts Museum, representing a crucial early milestone in Hōgai's combination of traditional Japanese religious motifs with nods to Western realism techniques.

Another work by Kanō Hōgai is his "Hawks in a Ravine" which is a ink-on-paper composition displaying a bird of prey sitting above a steep canyon, illustrating Hōgai's modern interpretation of the traditional Kanō school Kachōga and sansuiga.

"Lions" is an ink-and-color depicting Shishi done when he as actively involved in the Painting Appreciation Society founded by Ernest Fenollosa's, which is currently housed in the National Museum of Modern Art, Tokyo (MOMAT).

"Dragons Ascending the Heavens" is a large mural depicting dragons flying through the clouds, which is an example of his graceful brush strokes; bought from Ernest Fenollosa and kept in the Fenollosa-Weld collection in the Museum of Fine Arts, Boston.

== Legacy ==
Hōgai would eventually be called upon for such esteemed commissions as ceiling paintings for Edo Castle. He also received the honor of having some of his works displayed at the 1876 Paris International Exposition. However, despite these honors, the economic turmoil created by the fall of the shogunate in 1868 forced Hōgai to seek to support himself with income via more mundane methods. He worked at casting iron, reclaiming land, and running a shop selling writing instruments.

In 1877 Hōgai returned to Edo, now called Tokyo, and worked for the wealthy Shimazu clan; this gave him the opportunity to study works by some of Japan's greatest painting masters, including Sesshū and Sesson.

In 1884, Hōgai attracted the attention of Ernest Fenollosa, an art critic and collector from New England, who befriended him and bought several of his paintings. Along with Fenollosa, Okakura Kakuzō and Hashimoto Gahō, Hōgai then took part in the Painting Appreciation Society (観画会, Kangakai). The Society was created to draw attention to the traditional Japanese arts, particularly classical art of the Heian and Nara periods which were beginning to be seriously neglected, with many works sold or even destroyed due to Japan's newfound interest in the West.

== Gallery ==
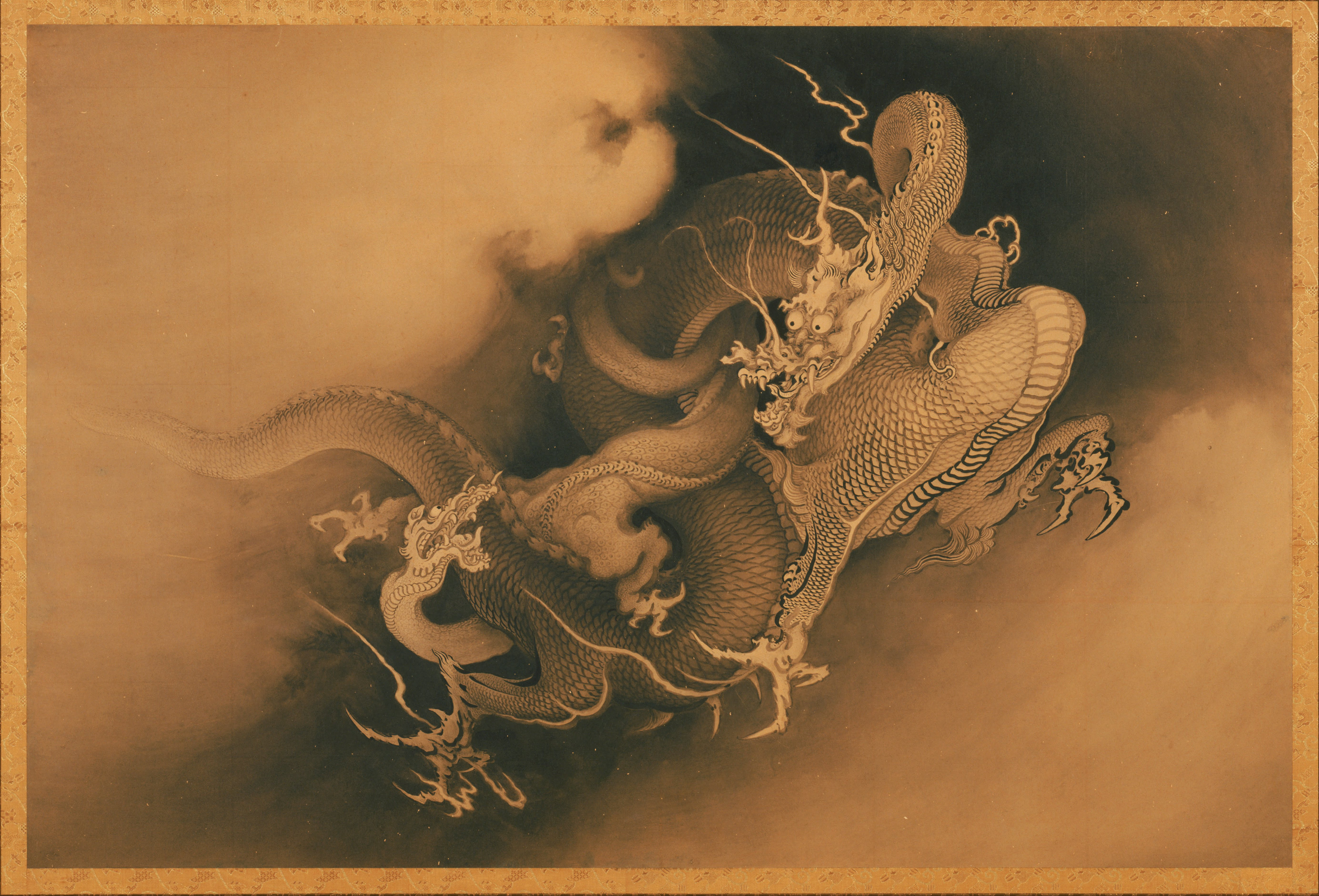
Two Dragons (In Clouds); Meiji Era, c. 1885. Ink on paper, framed. w135.3 × h90.2 cm. Philadelphia Museum of Art

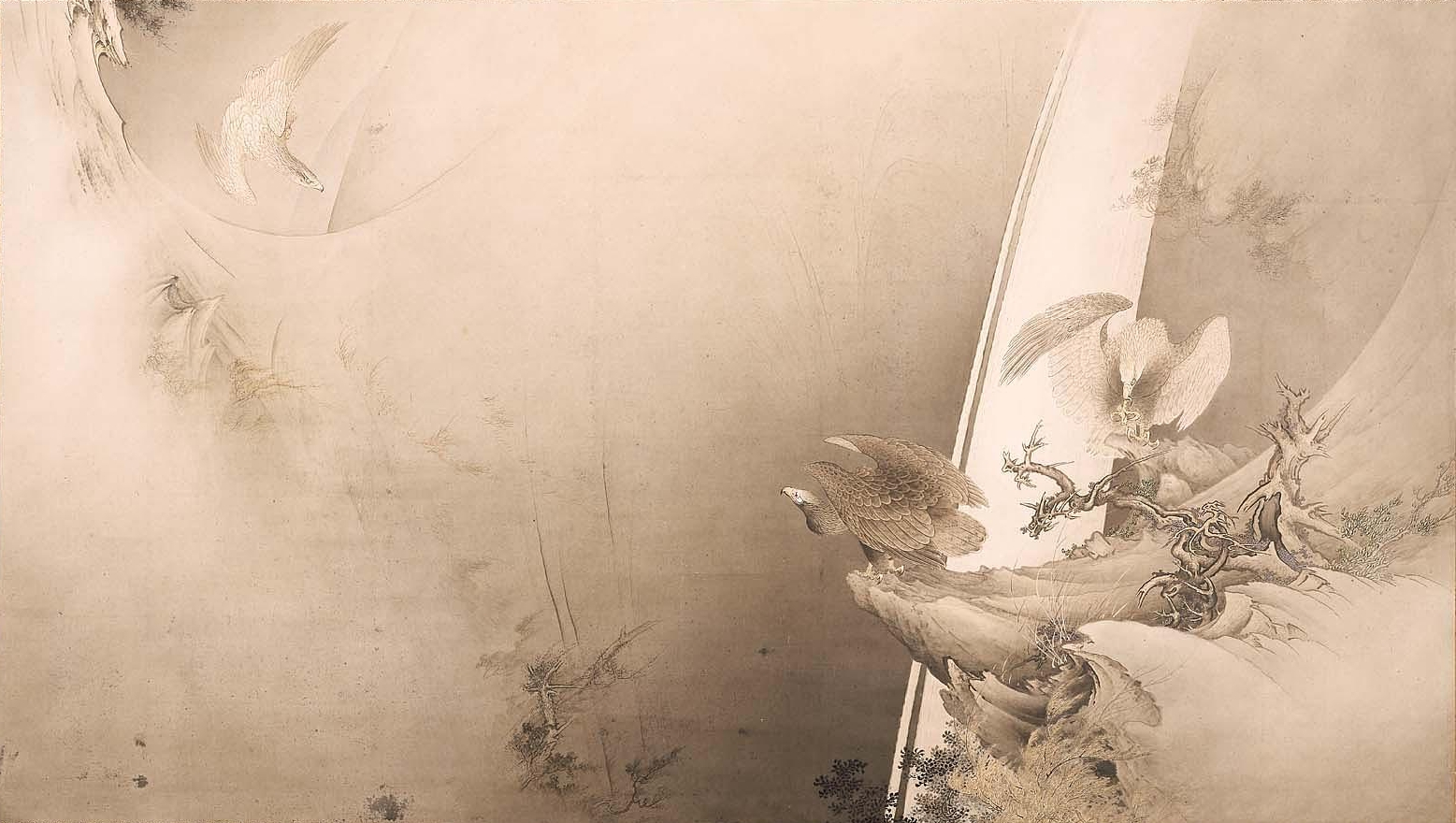
Hawks in a Ravine; Meiji Era, c. 1885. Ink on paper, w165.7 × h93.2 cm. Boston Museum of Fine Arts

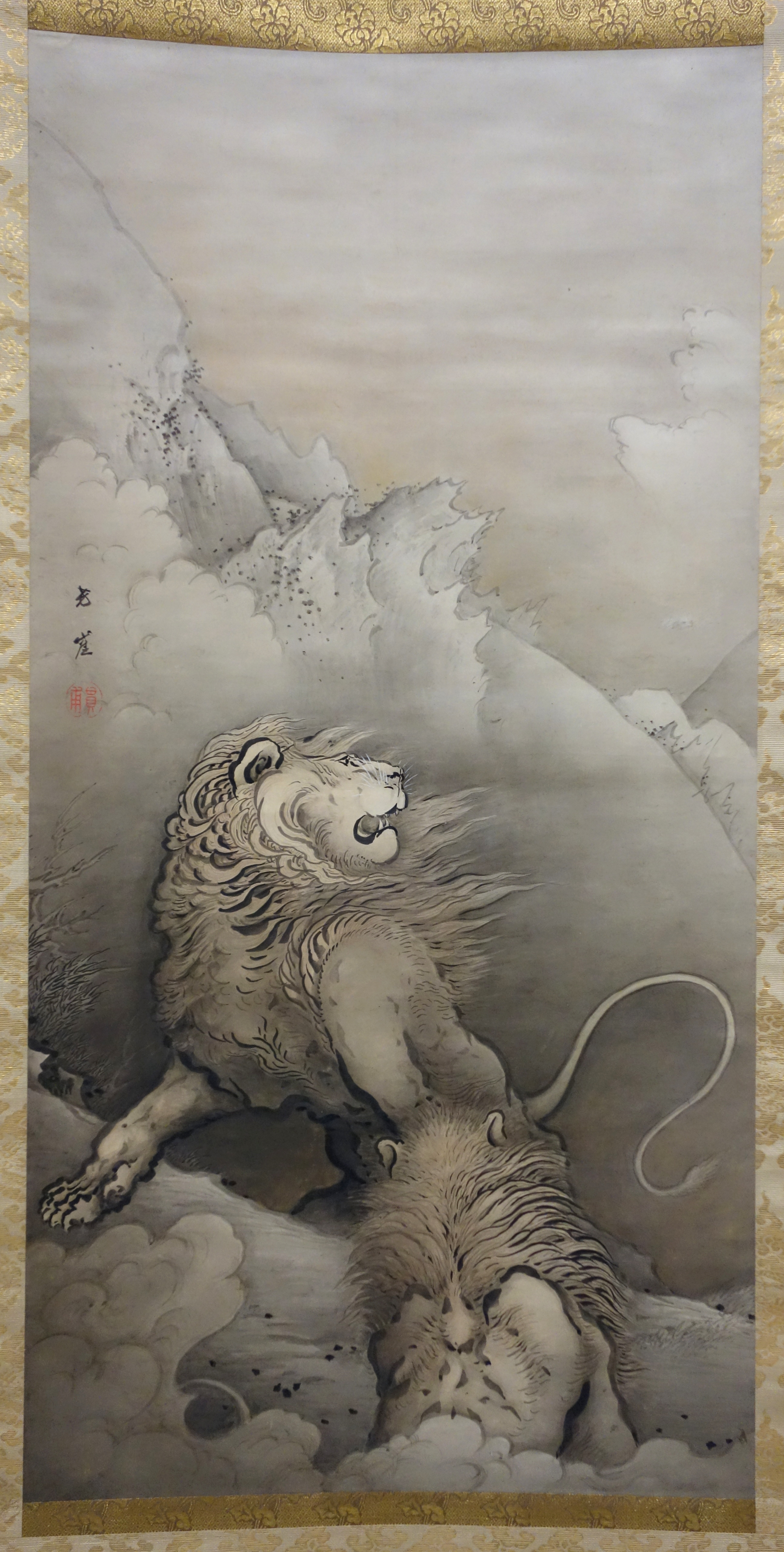
Lions; Meiji Era, c. 1886. Ink on paper. w49.5 × h98.3 cm. National Museum of Modern Art, Tokyo

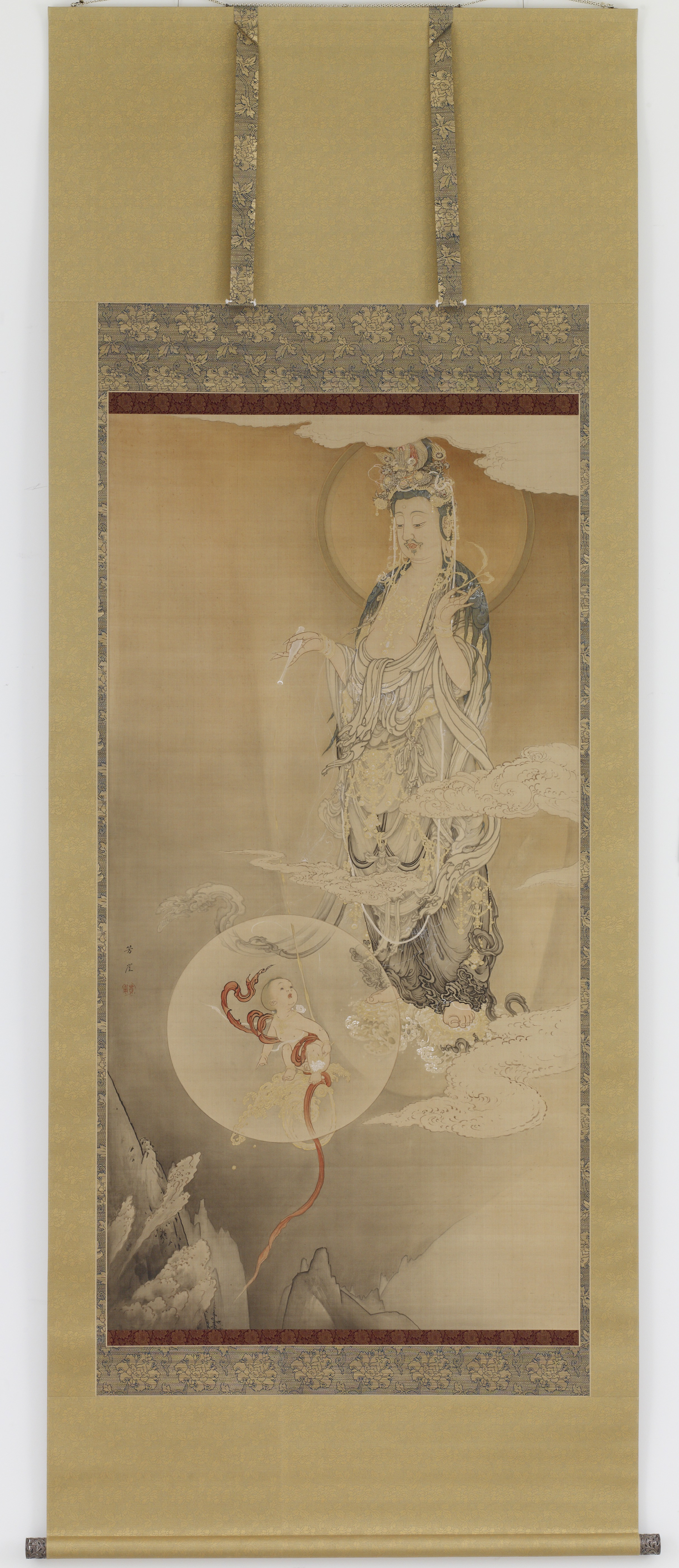
Hibo Kannon (悲母観音); Meiji Era, 1883. Ink, color and gold on silk. w84.6 × h163.9 cm. Freer Gallery of Art

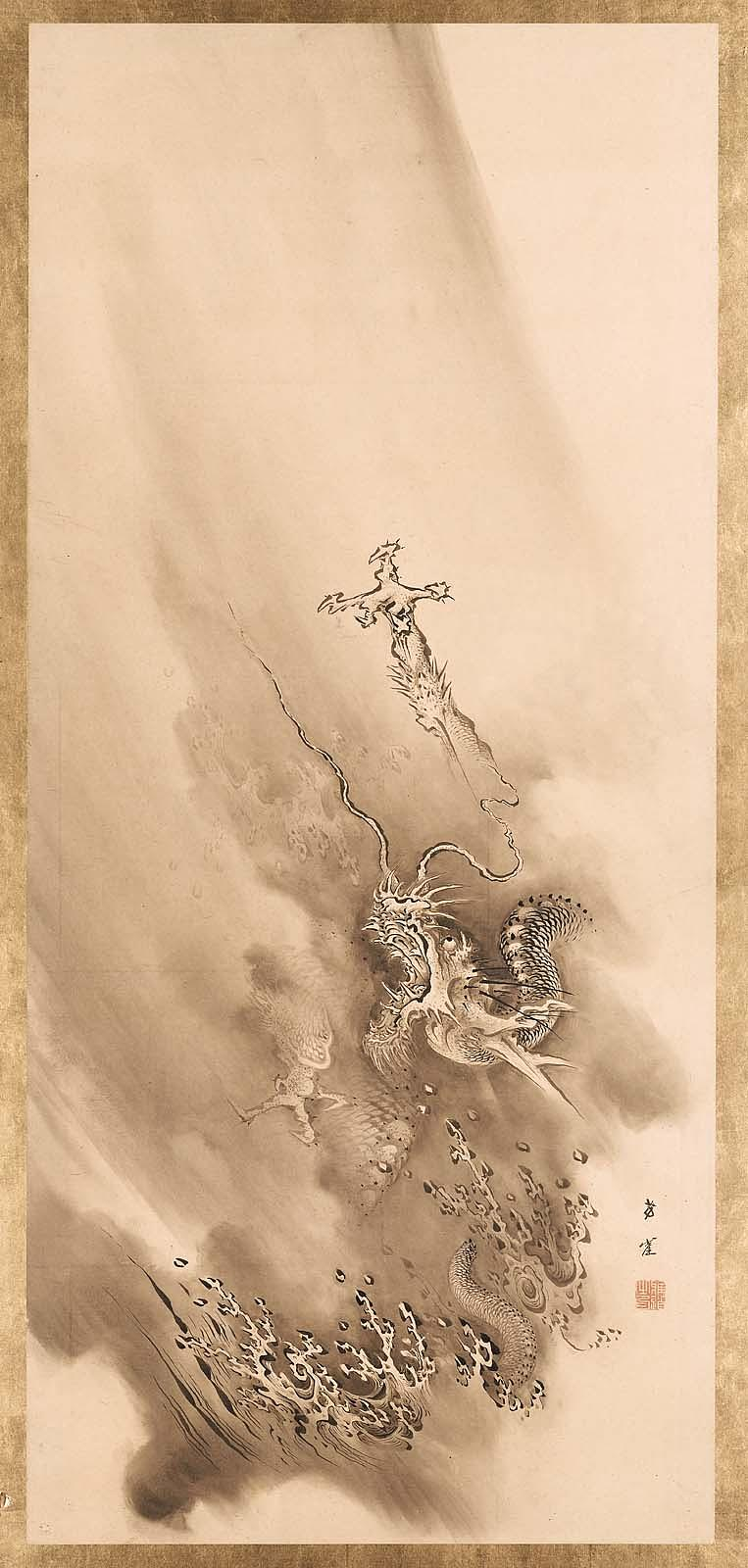
Dragons Ascending the Heavens (飛龍昇天); Meiji Era, c. 1887; Panel, ink on paper. w62.4 × h137.9 cm. Museum of Fine Arts, Boston
