= Kōno Bairei =

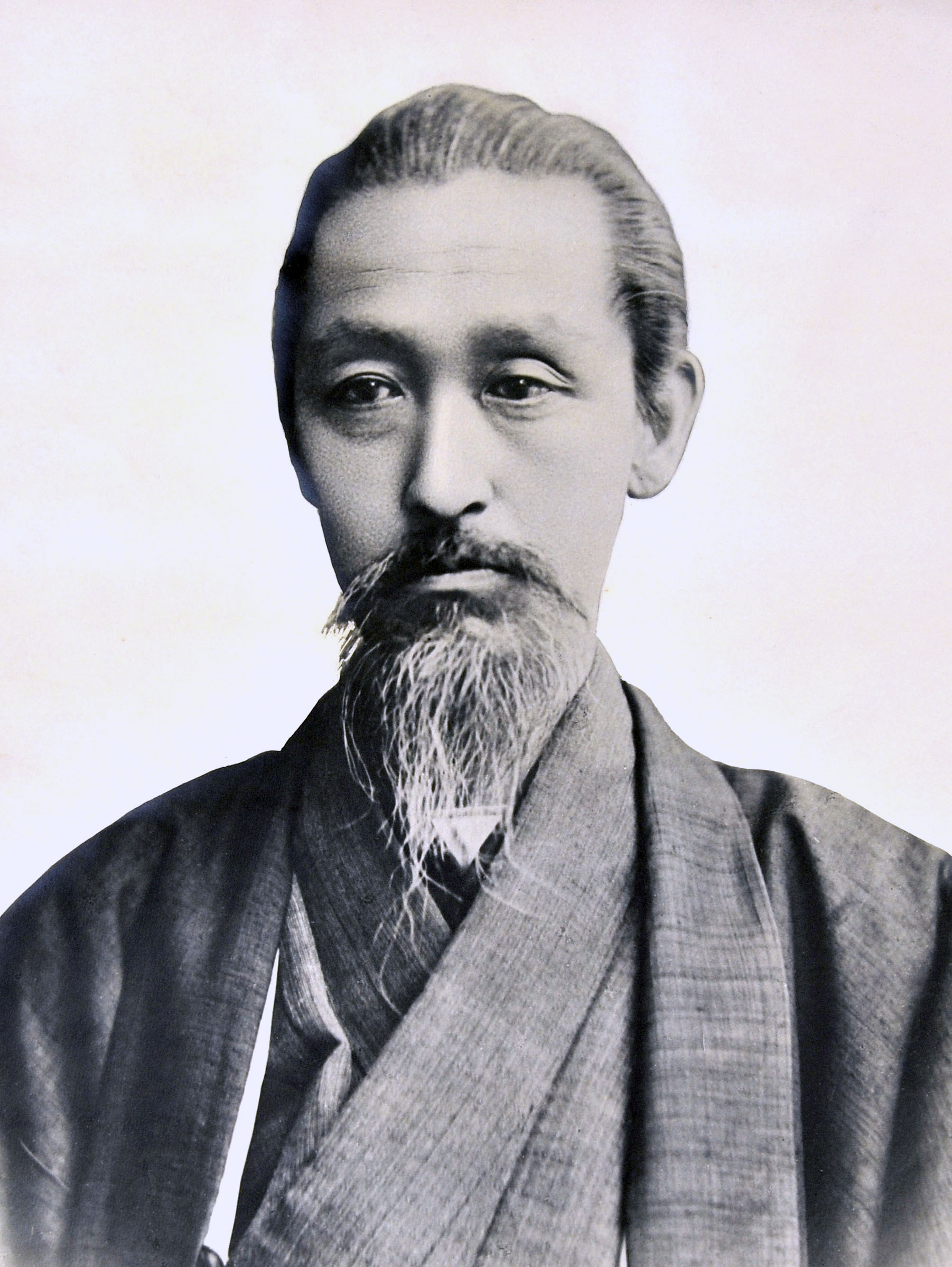
- Born: March 3, 1844; Kyoto, Tokugawa shogunate
- Died: February 20, 1895 (aged 50)
- Occupation: Japanese painter

Kōno Bairei (幸野 楳嶺; March 3, 1844 – February 20, 1895) was a Japanese painter, book illustrator, and art teacher. He was born (as Yasuda Bairei) and lived in Kyoto. He was a member of the broad Maruyama-Shijo school and was a master of kacho-e painting (depictions of birds and flowers) in the Meiji period of Japan.

== Biography ==
In 1852, he went to study with the Maruyama-school painter, Nakajima Raisho (1796–1871). After Raisho's death, Bairei studied with the Shijo-school master Shiokawa Bunrin (1808–77).

His work included flower prints, bird prints , and landscapes, with a touch of western realism. Bairei's Album of One Hundred Birds was published in 1881.

He opened an art school in 1880 and his students included Takeuchi Seihō, Kawai Gyokudō, and Uemura Shōen.
