= Kanō Naizen =

Japanese artist (1570–1616)

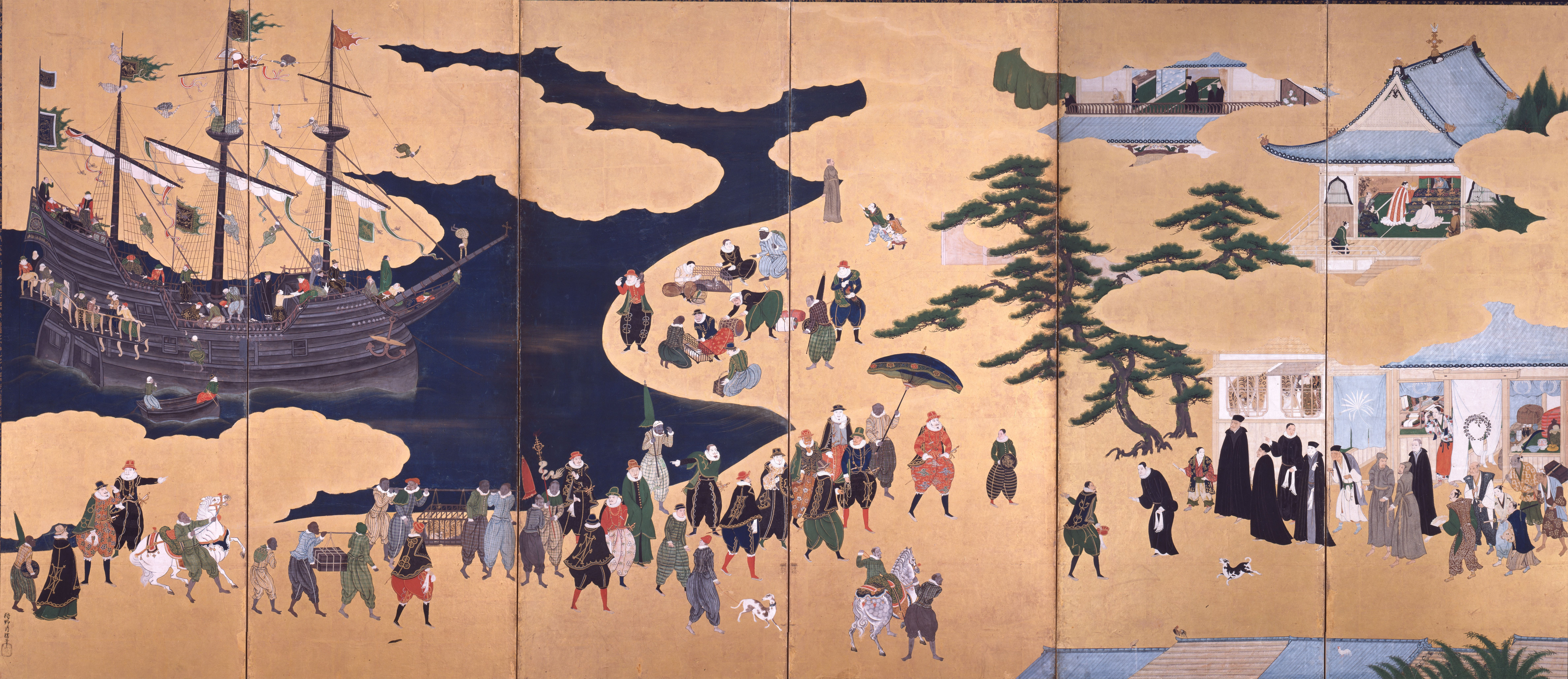
Nanban byōbu attributed to Naizen

Kanō Naizen (狩野 内膳; 1570–1616) was a Japanese painter. He was a part of the Japanese family of painters, the Kanō school. He was the middle son of school's head Kanō Eitoku, younger brother to the Kano school heir Kanō Mitsunobu, older brother to Kanō Takanobu, and adopted brother to the famed Kanō school painter Kanō Sanraku. Naizen primarily worked with his fathers and brothers in the head Kanō workshop in Kyoto to restore many imperial buildings, Buddhist temples, and Shinto shrines that were destroyed during the Kamakura period and the Genpei Wars. In 1610–15 Naizen moved to Edo (modern-day Tokyo), the new administration capital, at the behest of the recently ascendent Tokugawa shogunate, Tokugawa Ieyasu.

Stylistically, Naizen is often overshadowed by his father and brothers; however he is particularly known for his byōbu screen paintings of Nanban ("Southern Barbarians", i.e. Europeans). Naizen acquired his name when officially entering the Kanō school; his personal name was Shigesato (重里).

One of his more famous works, "Festivals of Toyokuni" (豊国の祭り), was one of these such paintings, produced in 1605 for the seventh anniversary of the death of Kampaku Toyotomi Hideyoshi, whose posthumous name was Toyokuni Daimyōjin (豊国大名人).
