= Kanō Tanshin =

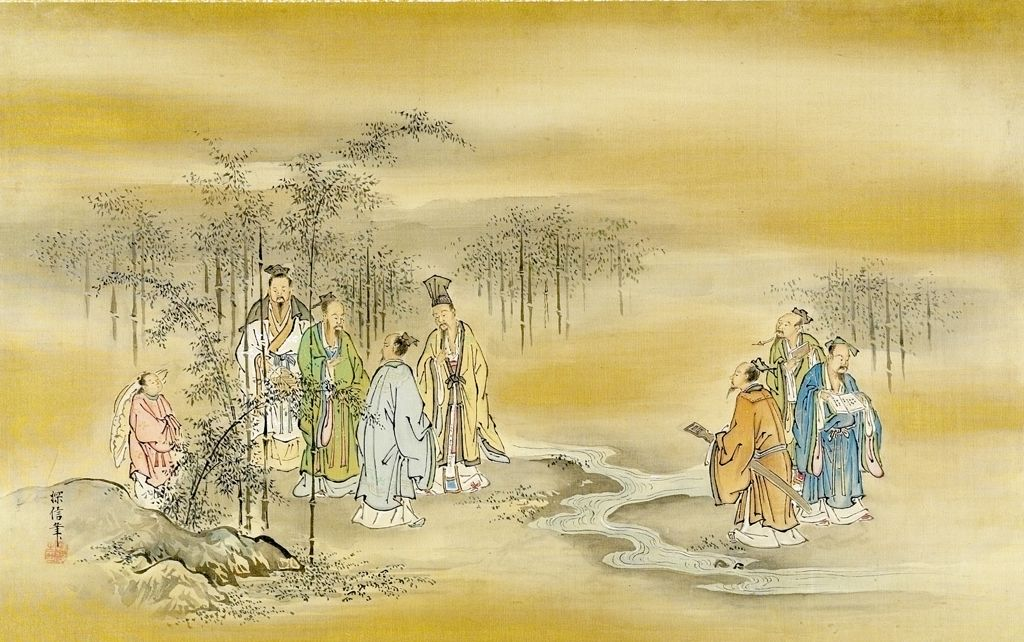
Seven Sages of the Bamboo Grove

Kanō Tanshin (Morimasa) (狩野 探信; 1653–1718) was a Japanese painter. He was the son of Kanō Tan'yū by his second wife and led the Kajibashi branch of the Kanō school after 1674.

Stylistically, he had a Tosa-like approach (competing with the Tosa school), but also departed slightly from the imitative style of Kanō school masters. This departure became a significant point of criticism in the rebellious anti-Kanō school movement of the late Edo period. Parallel anti-Kanō school artist Hanabusa Itchō commended Tanshin for his "rare talent," derived from his ability to use nature as a model. Itchō asserted that Tanshin became a true artist by capturing the spirit of the bamboo to convey an idea.
