= Kanō Shōsen'in =

Japanese painter

Kanō Shōsen'in (狩野 勝川院; 1823–1880) was a Japanese painter of the Kanō school. He was also known as Kanō Masanobu (the name of his famous ancestor, the founder of the school) and Kanō Shōsen, and took the gō (art-names) Soshōsei and Shōko.

Shōsen'in studied in a studio in the Kobikichō section of Edo, under his father, Seisen also known as Kanō Osanobu.
