= Kanō school =

Japanese art movement

Birds and Flowers of Spring and Summer, Kanō Einō

The Kanō school (狩野派, Kanō-ha) is one of the most famous schools of Japanese painting. The Kanō school of painting was the dominant style of painting from the late 15th century until the Meiji period which began in 1868, by which time the school had divided into many different branches. The Kanō family itself produced a string of major artists over several generations, to which large numbers of unrelated artists who trained in workshops of the school can be added. Some artists married into the family and changed their names, and others were adopted. According to the historian of Japanese art Robert Treat Paine, "another family which in direct blood line produced so many men of genius ... would be hard to find".

The school began by reflecting a renewed influence from Chinese painting, but developed a brightly coloured and firmly outlined style for large panels decorating the castles of the nobility which reflected distinctively Japanese traditions, while continuing to produce monochrome brush paintings in Chinese styles. It was supported by the shogunate, effectively representing an official style of art, which "in the 18th century almost monopolized the teaching of painting". It drew on the Chinese tradition of literati painting by scholar-bureaucrats, but the Kanō painters were firmly professional artists, very generously paid if successful, who received a formal workshop training in the family workshop, in a similar way to European painters of the Renaissance or Baroque. They worked mainly for the nobility, shōguns and emperors, covering a wide range of styles, subjects and formats. Initially innovative, and largely responsible for the new types of painting of the Azuchi–Momoyama period (1573–1600), from the 17th century the artists of the school became increasingly conservative and academic in their approach.

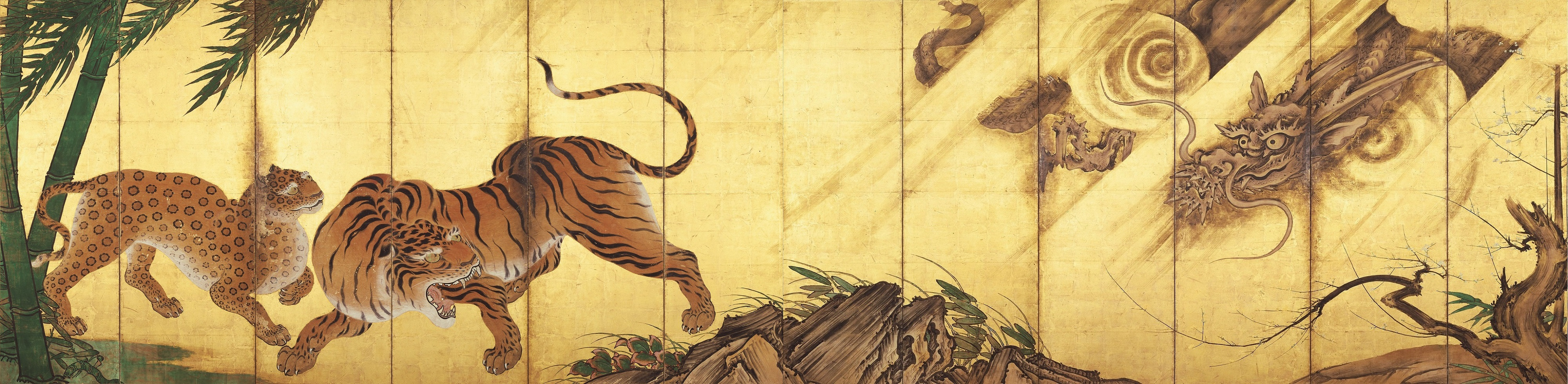
Pair of screens with tigers scared by a storm-dragon by Kanō Sanraku, 17th century, each 1.78 × 3.57 metres.

== Early period ==
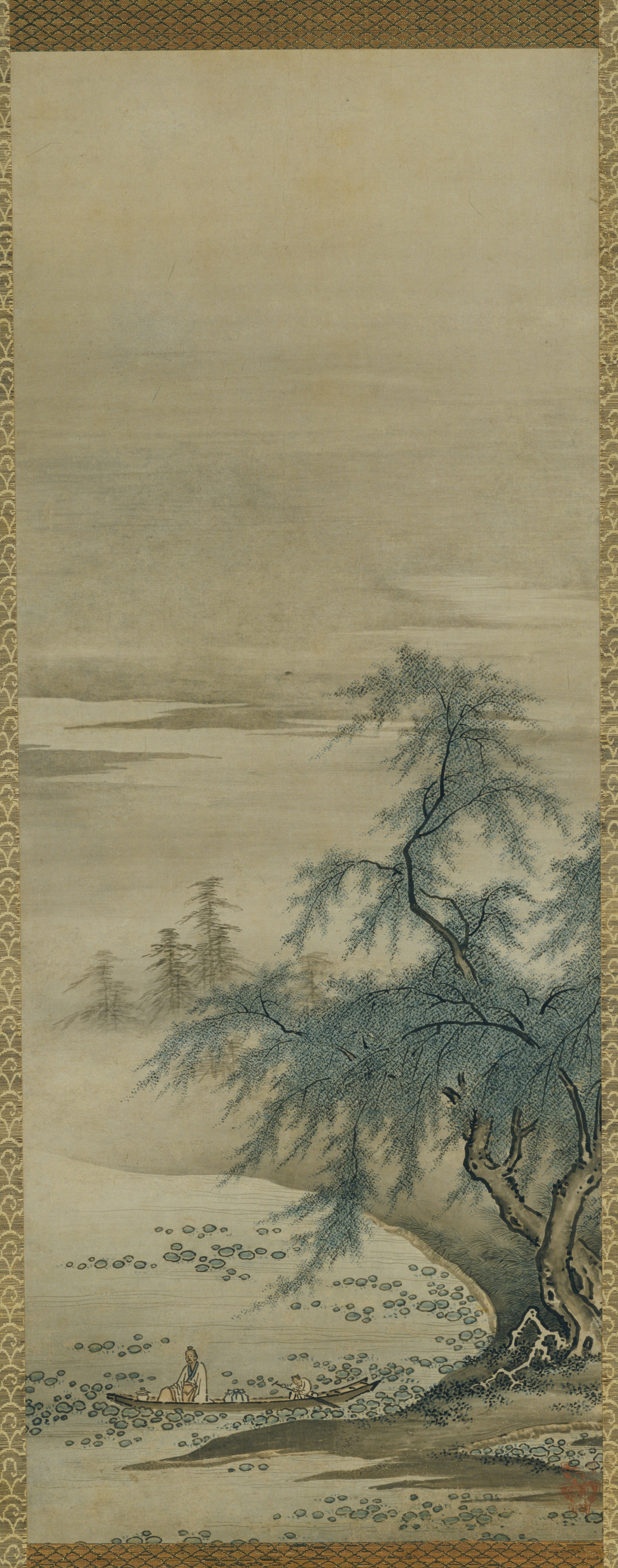
Zhou Maoshu Appreciating Lotuses A hanging scroll painted by Kanō Masanobu

The school was founded by the very long-lived Kanō Masanobu (1434–1530), who was the son of Kagenobu, a samurai and amateur painter. Masanobu was a contemporary of Sesshū (1420–1506), a leader of the revival of Chinese influence, who had actually visited China in mid-career, in around 1467. Sesshū may have been a student of Shūbun, recorded from about 1414 (as an apprentice) and 1465, another key figure in the revival of Chinese idealist traditions in Japanese painting. Masanobu began his career in Shūbun's style, and works are recorded between 1463 and 1493. He was appointed court artist to the Muromachi government, and his works evidently included landscape ink wash paintings in a Chinese style, as well as figure paintings and birds and flowers. Few works certainly from his hand survive; they include a large screen with a crane in a snowy landscape in the Shinju-an, a sub-temple of Daitoku-ji. Masanobu's Chinese-style Zhou Maoshu Appreciating Lotuses in the Kyushu National Museum (illustrated left) is a National Treasure of Japan.

Masanobu trained his sons Kanō Motonobu (1476–1559) and the younger Yukinobu (or Utanosuke). Motonobu is usually credited with establishing the school's distinctive technique and style, or rather different styles, which brought a firmer line and stronger outlines to paintings using Chinese conventions. Less interest was taken in subtle effects of atmospheric recession that in the Chinese models, and elements in the composition tend to be placed at the front of the picture space, often achieving decorative effects in a distinctively Japanese way. Motonobu married the daughter of Tosa Mitsunobu, the head of the Tosa school, which continued the classic Japanese yamato-e style of largely narrative and religious subjects, and Kanō paintings subsequently also included more traditional Japanese subjects typical of that school.

== Castle decoration ==
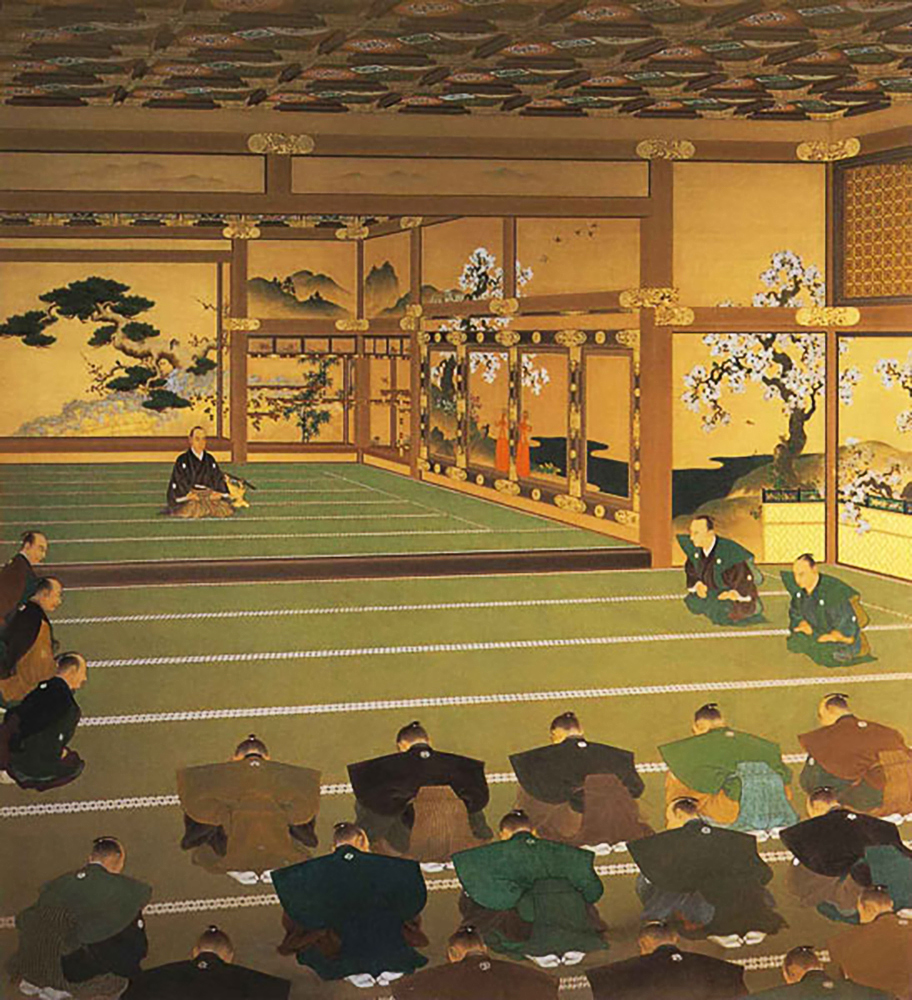
Tokugawa Yoshinobu in the Kuroshoin of the Ninomaru palace of Nijō Castle, showing a fully decorated hall, Tanryō Murata

The school was instrumental in developing new forms of painting for decorating the new styles of castles of the new families of daimyōs (feudal lords) that emerged in the struggles of the Azuchi–Momoyama period of civil war that ended with the establishment of the Tokugawa shogunate in 1603. The new lords had risen to power by military skill, and mostly lacked immersion in the sophisticated traditions of Japanese culture long cultivated in Buddhist monasteries and the Imperial court. Bold and vigorous styles using bright colour on a gold ground (background in gold leaf or paint) appealed to the taste of these patrons, and were applied to large folding screens (byōbu) and sets of sliding doors (fusuma). In the grandest rooms most of the walls were painted, although interrupted by wooden beams, with some designs continuing regardless of these. Very many examples in castles have been lost to fires, whether accidental or caused in war, but others were painted for monasteries, or given to them from castles, which if they survived World War II bombing have had a better chance of survival.

Common subjects were landscapes, often as a background for animals and dragons, or birds, trees or flowers, or compositions with a few large figures, but crowded panoramic scenes from a high viewpoint were also painted. The animals and plants shown often had moral or perhaps political significance that is not always obvious today; the Chinese-style ink wash scroll by Kanō Eitoku of Chao Fu and his Ox, illustrated in the gallery below, illustrates a Chinese legend and contains a "Confucian moral [which] points to the dangers inherent in political position", a very topical message for Japan in the period following the disruptive civil wars caused by naked political ambition.

Some of the most famous examples of castle decoration can be found at the Nijō Castle in Kyoto. In 1588 the warlord Toyotomi Hideyoshi is said to have assembled a walkway between 100 painted screens as the approach to a flower party. That, unlike scrolls, sliding doors were by convention not signed, and screens only rarely, considerably complicates the business of attributing works to painters who were able to paint in several styles. At the same time the school continued to paint monochrome ink-on-silk landscapes for hanging scrolls in the Chinese tradition, as well as other types of subjects such as portraits. The types of scrolls were both vertical for hanging, with a backing usually of thick woven silk, the traditional Chinese format which became the most common in Japan in this period (kakemono in Japanese), and in the long horizontal handscroll (emakimono) format as used for books. Many screens and doors were also painted in monochrome, especially for monasteries, and scrolls were also painted in full colour. Kanō ink painters composed very flat pictures but they balanced impeccably detailed realistic depictions of animals and other subjects in the foreground with abstract, often entirely blank, clouds and other background elements. The use of negative space to indicate distance, and to imply mist, clouds, sky or sea is drawn from traditional Chinese modes and is used beautifully by the Kanō artists. Bold brush strokes and thus bold images are obtained in what is often a very subtle and soft medium. These expertly painted monochrome ink paintings contrast with the almost gaudy but no less beautiful gold-on-paper forms these artists created for walls and screens.

=== Cypress screen by Eitoku ===
Eight-panel screen attributed to Kanō Eitoku of Cypress Trees, 1.7 x 4.61 metres

This eight panel screen attributed to Eitoku, around 1590, shows the vigour of the new Momoyama castle style, which he is probably mainly responsible for developing. It is a National Treasure of Japan in the Tokyo National Museum, and described by Paine as "typical for hurried sweep of composition, for pure nature design, and for strength of individual brush stroke. ... Golden cloud-like areas representing mist are placed arbitrarily in the background, and emphasize the decorative magnitude of what is otherwise the powerful drawing of giant tree forms".

The screen is unusually large and there are noticeable discontinuities in the composition at the breaks between (counting from the left) panels 2 and 3, 4 and 5, 6 and 7. These reflect the original format as a set of four sliding doors, which can be deduced from this and the covered-over recesses for the door-pulls. The discontinuities would be much less obvious when the screen was standing in a zig-zag pattern, as would normally have been the case. The screen uses the "floating-cloud" convention of much older Yamato-e Japanese art, where areas the artist chooses not to represent are hidden beneath solid colour (here gold) representing mist. Designs of this type, dominated by a single massive tree, became a common composition in the school, and this one can be compared to the similar screen of a plum tree by Sanretsu from a few decades later (illustrated below), which shows a more restrained version of the first bold Momoyama style.

== Height of influence and decline ==
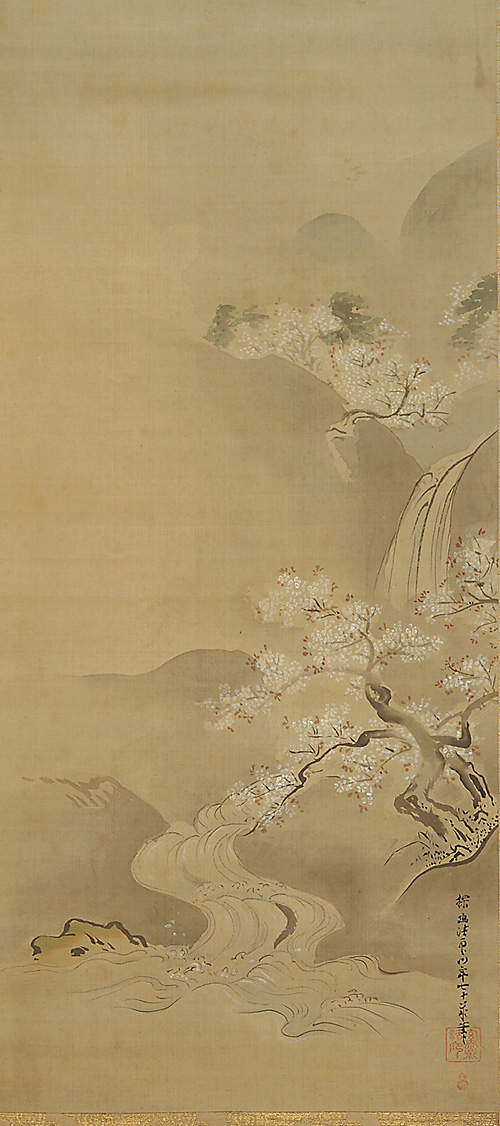
Spring Landscape by Kanō Tan'yū, 17th century

Kanō Eitoku (1543–1590), a grandson of Motonobu and probably his pupil, was the most important painter of this generation, and is believed to have been the first to use a gold-leaf background in large paintings. He appears to have been the main figure in developing the new castle style, but while his importance is fairly clear there are few if any certain attributions to him, especially to his hand alone; in the larger works attributed to him he probably worked together with one of more other artists of the school. Despite having two painter sons, at the suggestion (if not the order) of Toyotomi Hideyoshi, Eitoku adopted Kanō Sanraku (1561–1635), who married his daughter and succeeded him as head of the school. Sanraku's works (two illustrated here) at their best combine the forceful quality of Momoyama work with the tranquil depiction of nature and more refined use of colour typical of the Edo period. When Sanraku had no son he married Kanō Sansetsu (1589–1651) to his daughter and adopted him. Sansetsu and his school remained in Kyoto when most Kanō artists moved to Edo (often after a summons from the shōgun), and he continued to adhere to the brightly coloured style of the Momoyama period. His son Einō painted in the same style, but is better known for a biographical history of Japanese painting, which gave the Kanō school pride of place.

The range of forms, styles and subjects that were established in the early 17th century continued to be developed and refined without major innovation for the next two centuries, and although the Kanō school was the most successful in Japan, the distinctions between the work of it and other schools tended to diminish, as all the schools worked in a range of styles and formats, making the attribution of unsigned works often unclear. The Kanō school split into different branches in Kyoto and the new capital of Edo, which had three for much of this period: the Kajibashi, Nakabashi and Kobikicho, named after their locations in Edo.

The last of the "three famous brushes" of the school, with Motonobu and Eitoku, was Kanō Tan'yū (originally named Morinobu, 1602–1674), who was recognised as an outstanding talent as a child, attending an audience with the shōgun at the age of 10, and receiving a good official appointment in 1617. He was Eitoku's grandson through his second son Kanō Takanobu (1572–1618), also a significant painter; Tan'yū's brother Yasunobu was adopted into the main line of the family. Tan'yū headed the Kajibashi branch of the school in Edo and painted in many castles and the Imperial palace, in a less bold but extremely elegant style, which however tended to become stiff and academic in the hands of less-talented imitators. The best Kanō artists continued to work mostly for the nobility, with increasingly stultified versions of the style and subject-matter already established, but other Kanō-trained artists worked for the new urban merchant class, and in due course moved into the new form of the ukiyo-e print. Hiroshige is among the ukiyo-e artists whose work shows influence from the Kanō school. Despite the loss of official patronage with the Meiji period, artists continued to work in the Kanō style until the early 20th century. Kanō Shōsen'in, who died in 1880, was a descendant of the main line of the family. One late follower of the school was Kanō Kazunobu (1816–1853), who adopted the name as a sign of his respect, and painted a series of large scrolls of the 500 Arhats which has recently received a revival of attention after being hidden away since World War II.

== National Treasures ==
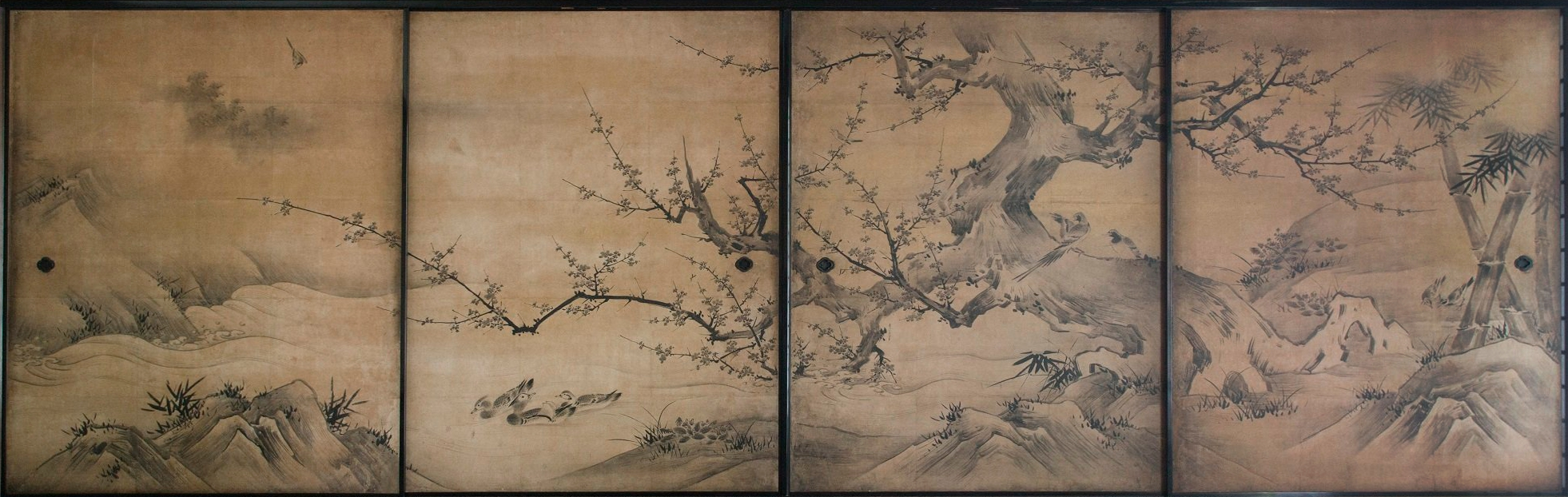
Birds and Flowers of the Four Seasons, a National Treasure by Kanō Eitoku

A number of paintings by the schools that are still in Japan are included in the official List of National Treasures of Japan (paintings). From the 15th century Azuchi–Momoyama period come the Chinese-style hanging scroll Zhou Maoshu Appreciating Lotuses by Kanō Masanobu (illustrated above), and a six-section screen by Kanō Hideyori of Maple Viewers, an early Kanō example of Yamato-e subject matter. From the Momoyama period there is a set of room decorations on walls, doors and screens by Kanō Eitoku and his father Shōei, in the Jukō-in (abbot's lodging) at the Daitoku-ji monastery in Kyoto; this includes the doors with Birds and flowers of the four seasons illustrated here. Also by Eitoku is the screen with a Cypress tree in the Tokyo National Museum, discussed and illustrated above, and a pair of six panel screens showing crowded panoramic views of Scenes in and around the capital in a museum in Yonezawa, Yamagata. By Kanō Naganobu there is a pair of screens (less two sections lost in an earthquake in 1923) showing relatively large figures Merry-making under aronia blossoms, also in the Tokyo National Museum. Other artists with works on the list, for example Hasegawa Tōhaku (16th century) and Maruyama Ōkyo (19th century), were trained by the school or otherwise influenced by it. Many other works by the school have received the lower designation of Important Cultural Properties of Japan.

== Artists ==
The following list is an incomplete group of major figures of their day, mostly from the Kanō family itself; there were many other artists named Kanō who retained links with the various family workshops, and still more who trained in one of these before continuing their careers independently:

Working timeline and relations of Kanō artists

- Kanō Masanobu (1434–1530): founder of the Kanō school
- Kanō Motonobu (1476–1559): son of Masanobu
- Kanō Soshu (1551–1601)
- Kanō Eitoku (1543–1590)
- Kanō Hideyori (d. 1557)
- Kanō Dōmi (1568–1600)
- Kanō Mitsunobu (d. 1608)
- Kanō Sanraku (1559–1635)
- Kanō Naizen (1570–1616)
- Kanō Sansetsu (1589–1651): the leader of the Kyō-ganō school, an offshoot of the Kanō school, based in Kyoto
- Kanō Tan'yū (1602–1674)
- Kanō Naonobu (1607–1650)
- Kanō Yasunobu (1643–1682)
- Kanō Einō (1631–1697)
- Kanō Tsunenobu (1636–1713)
- Kiyohara Yukinobu (1643–1682), niece of Kanō Tan'yū
- Kanō Tanshin (1653–1718)
- Kanō Chikanobu *Kanō-ryu* (1660–1728)
- Kanō Michinobu (1730–1790)
- Kanō Shōsen'in (1823–1880)
- Kanō Hōgai (1828–1888)
- Hashimoto Gahō (1835–1908)

== The Kanō family ==
The Kanō family of painters was founded by Kanō Masanobu (1434–1530). Through his father, Kanō Kagenobu, Masanobu is said to be a descendant of Kanō Muneshige, a samurai of the Kamakura period of the Kanō clan. Through this lineage, the Kanō family would descend from the Fujiwara clan through the Kudō clan.

The following list is of biological members of the Kanō family and its branches.

=== From Masanobu until Tan'yū ===
- Kanō Masanobu (1434–1530)
- Kanō Motonobu (1476–1559): son of Masanobu
- Kanō Shōei (1519–1592): son of Motonobu
- Kanō Munenobu: son of Motonobu
- Kanō Hideyori: son of Motonobu
- Kanō Eitoku (1543–1590): son of Shōei
- Kanō Sōshū: son of Shōei
- Kanō Naganobu (1577–1654): son of Shōei
- Kanō Naizen (1570–1616): son of Shōei
- Kanō Jinnojō: son of Sōshū
- Kanō Mitsunobu (1565–1608): son of Eitoku
- Kanō Takanobu (1571–1618): son of Eitoku
- Kaihō Yūshō (1533–1615): son of Eitoku
- Kanō Sanraku (1559–1635): son of Eitoku
- Kanō Sadanobu (1597–1623): son of Mitsunobu
- Kanō Kōkei: son of Mitsunobu
- Kanō Tan'yū (1602–1674): son of Takanobu
- Kanō Naonobu (1607–1650): son of Takanobu
- Kanō Yasunobu (1614–1685): son of Takanobu

=== The Kobikicho House (Naonobu's side) ===
- Kanō Naonobu (1607–1650)

=== The Nakabashi House (Hideyori's side) ===
- Kanō Hideyori

== Gallery ==
Works

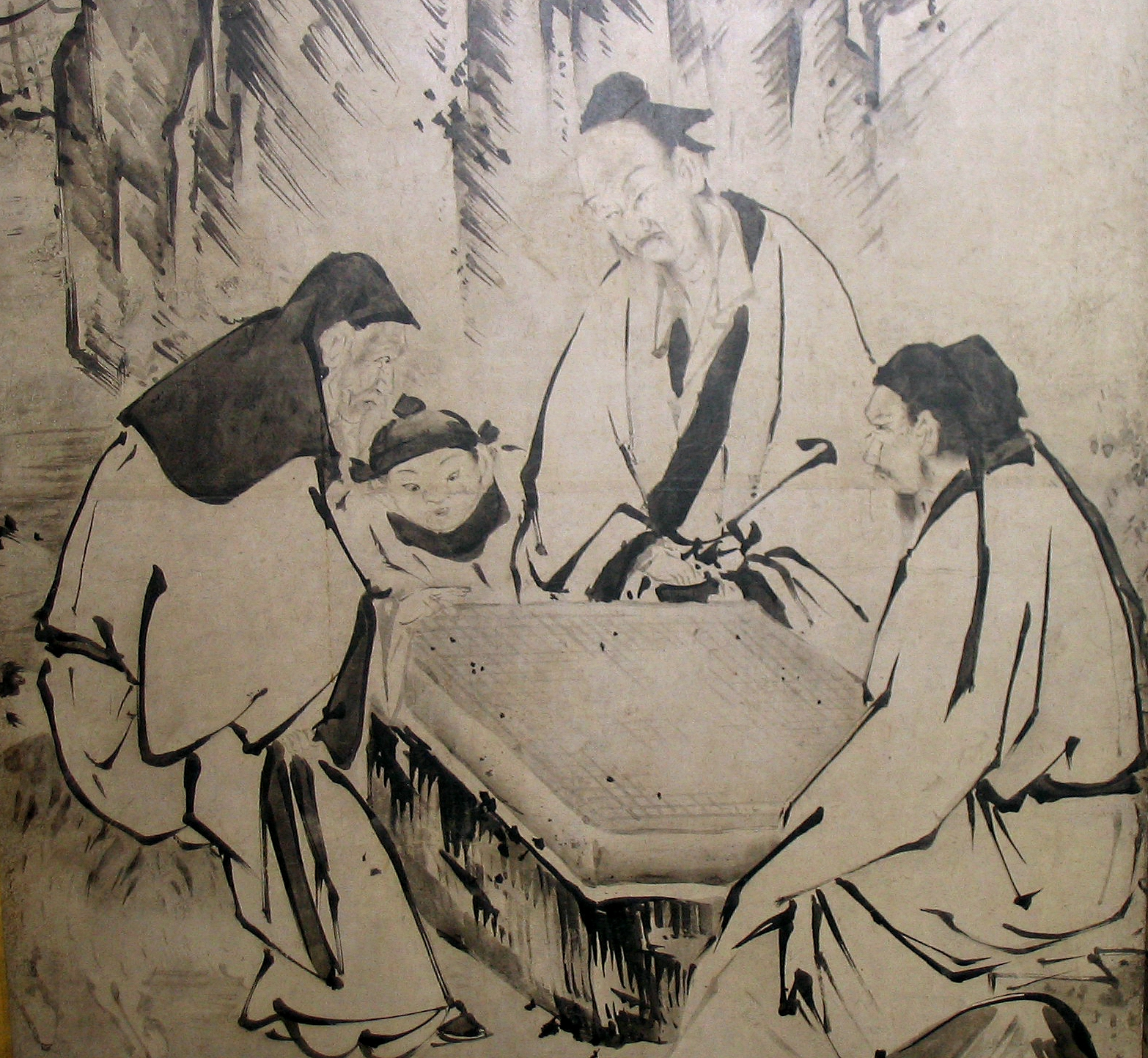
Detail of The Four Accomplishments, by Kanō Eitoku. One of six folding screens: ink on paper. Shows people playing go.

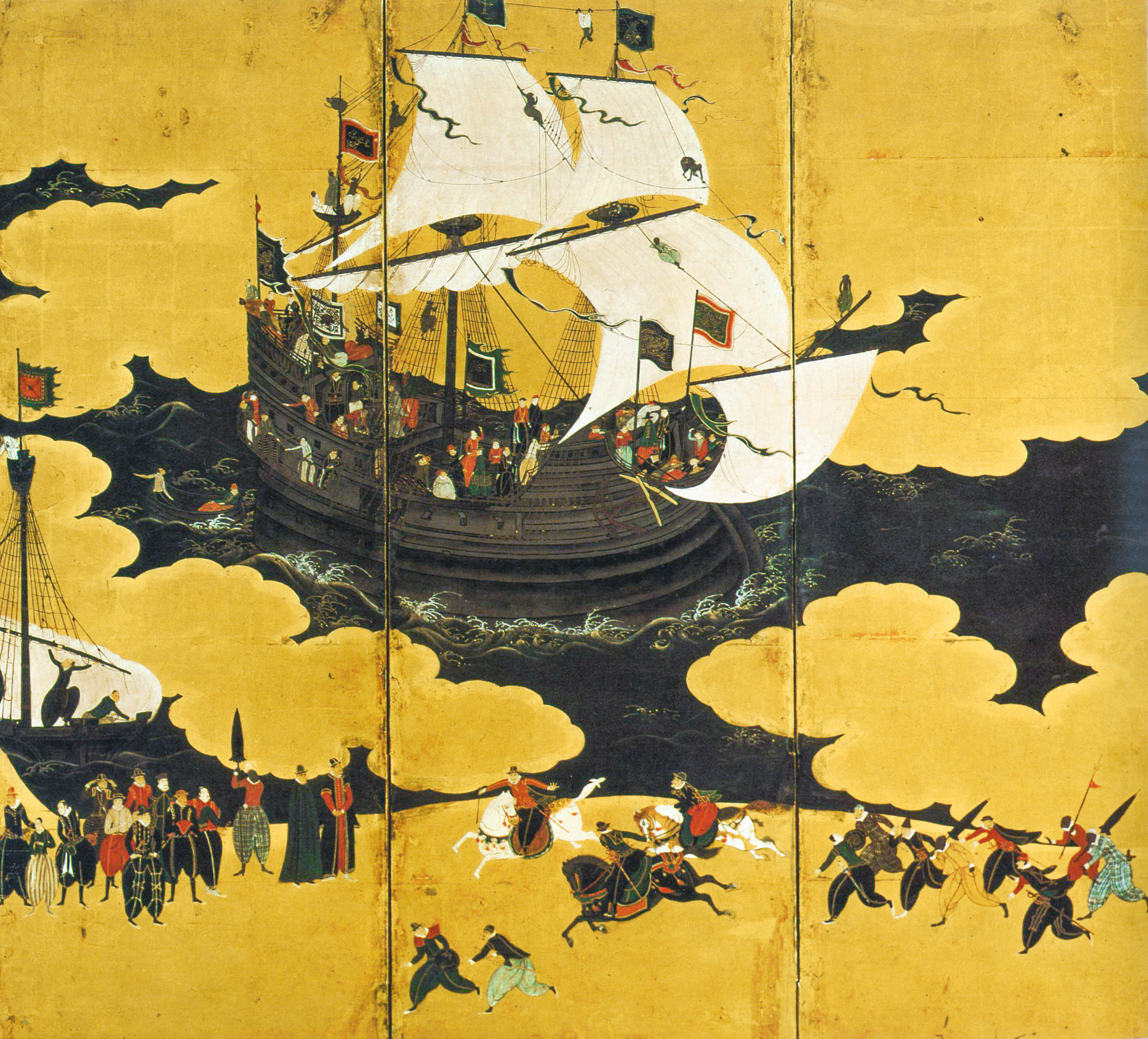
Screen detail depicting arrival of a Western ship, attributed to Kanō Naizen (1570–1616).

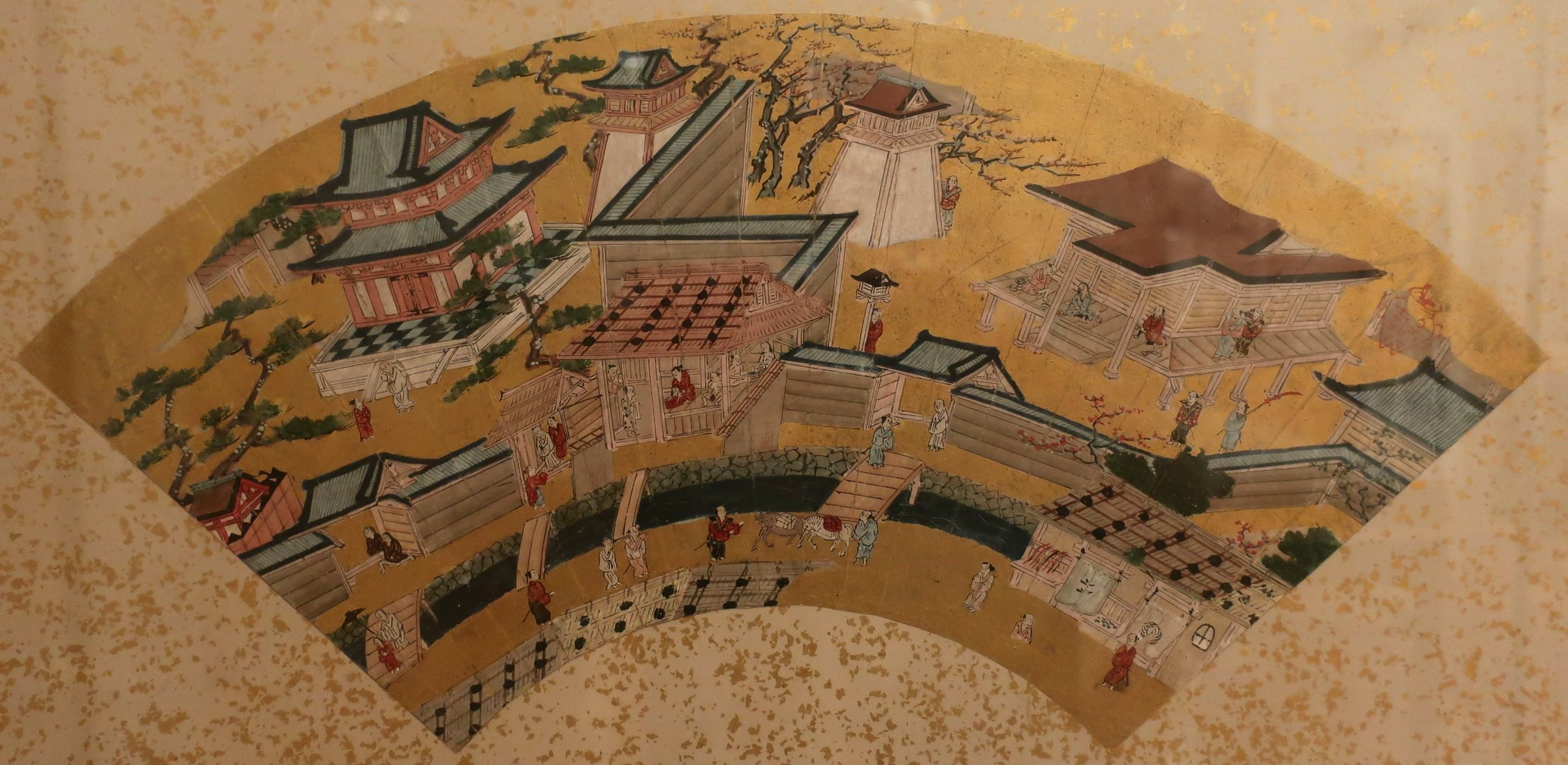
View of Kyoto, fan painting by Kanō Motohide, late 16th century, one of a set of 10

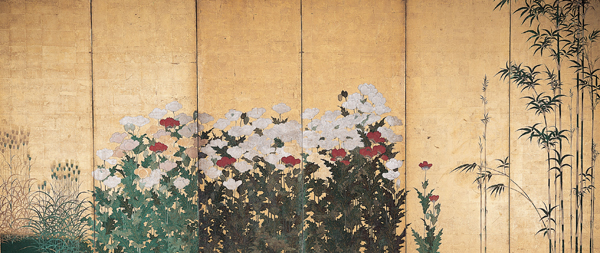
Screen of Wheat, Poppies, and Bamboo by Kanō Shigenobu

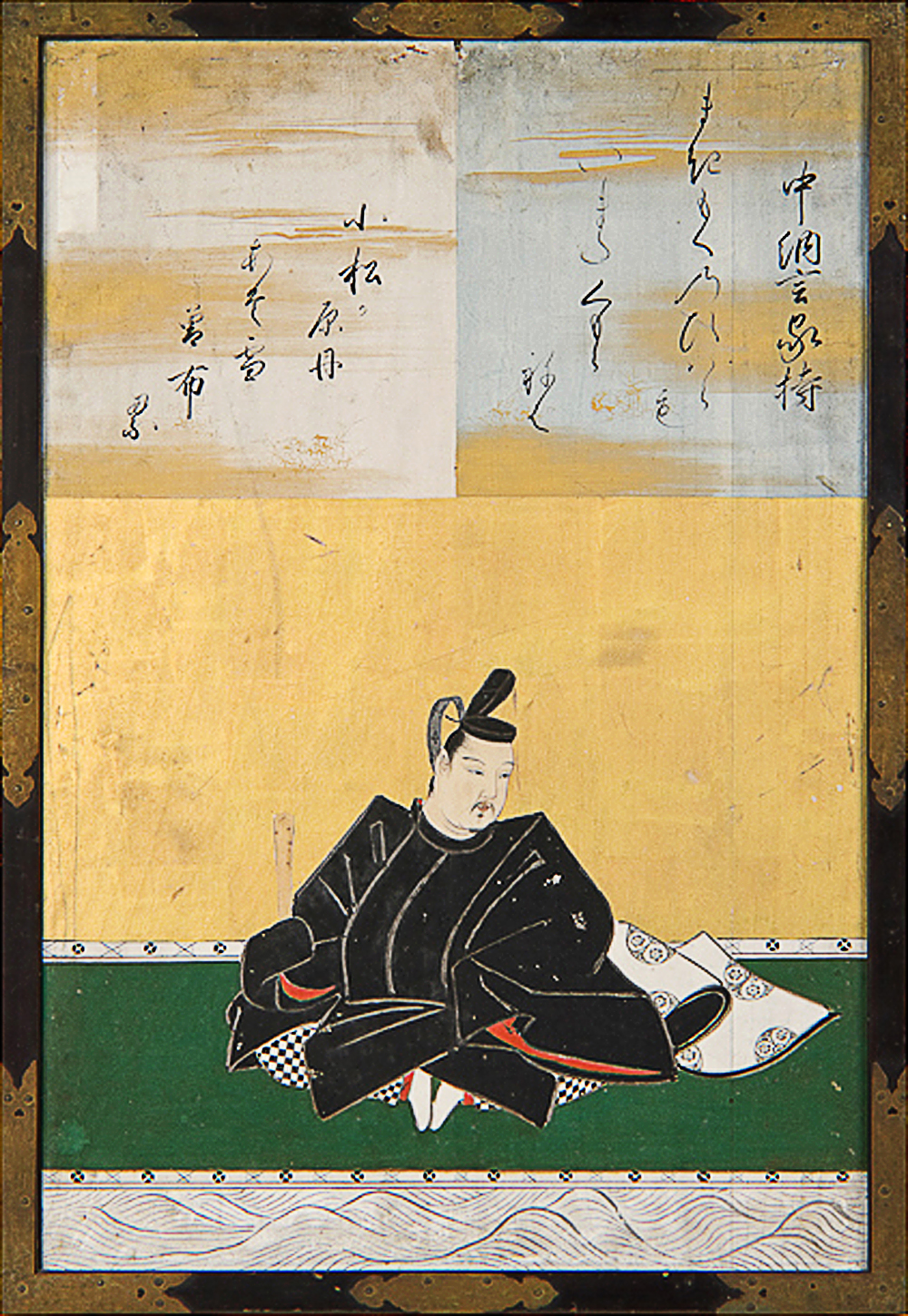
Framed imaginary portrait of the 8th century poet Ōtomo no Yakamochi from a series of the Thirty-six Poetry Immortals, Kanō Tan'yū, 1648

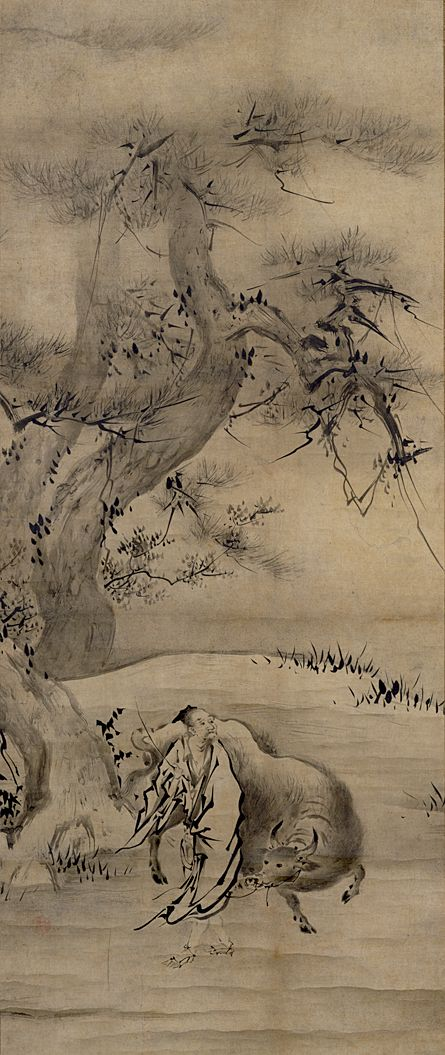
Chao Fu and his Ox, Chinese-style ink wash scroll by Kanō Eitoku in the Daitoku-ji, Kyoto, late 16th century.

== See also ==
- Several Kanō school artworks are deemed National Treasures of Japan, further reading on these specific pieces can be found at List of National Treasures of Japan (paintings).
