= Daikaku-ji =

Buddhist temple in Kyoto, Japan

Coordinates: 35.028314°N 135.677802°E

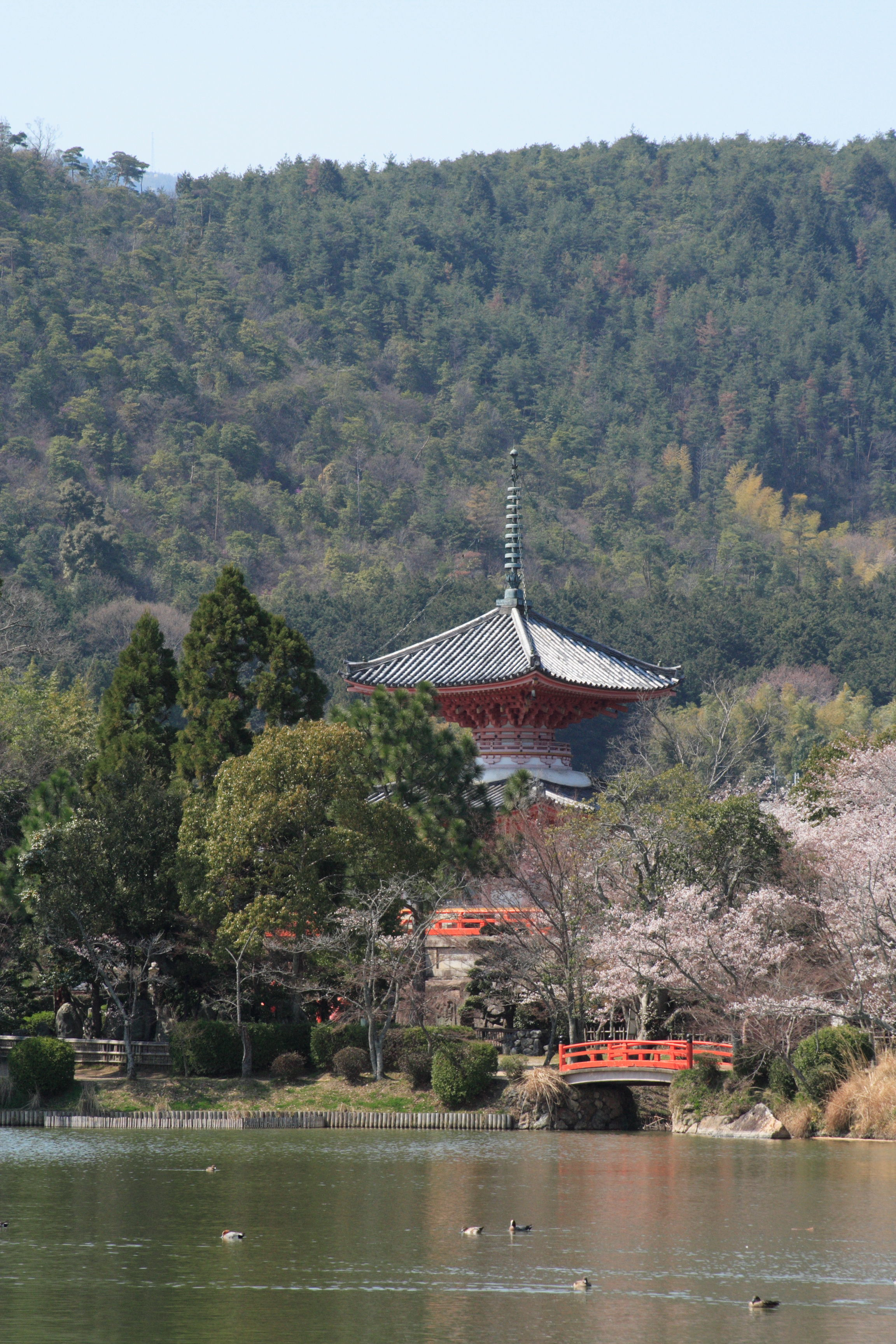
Daikaku-ji in Kyoto, overlooking the Ōsawa Pond

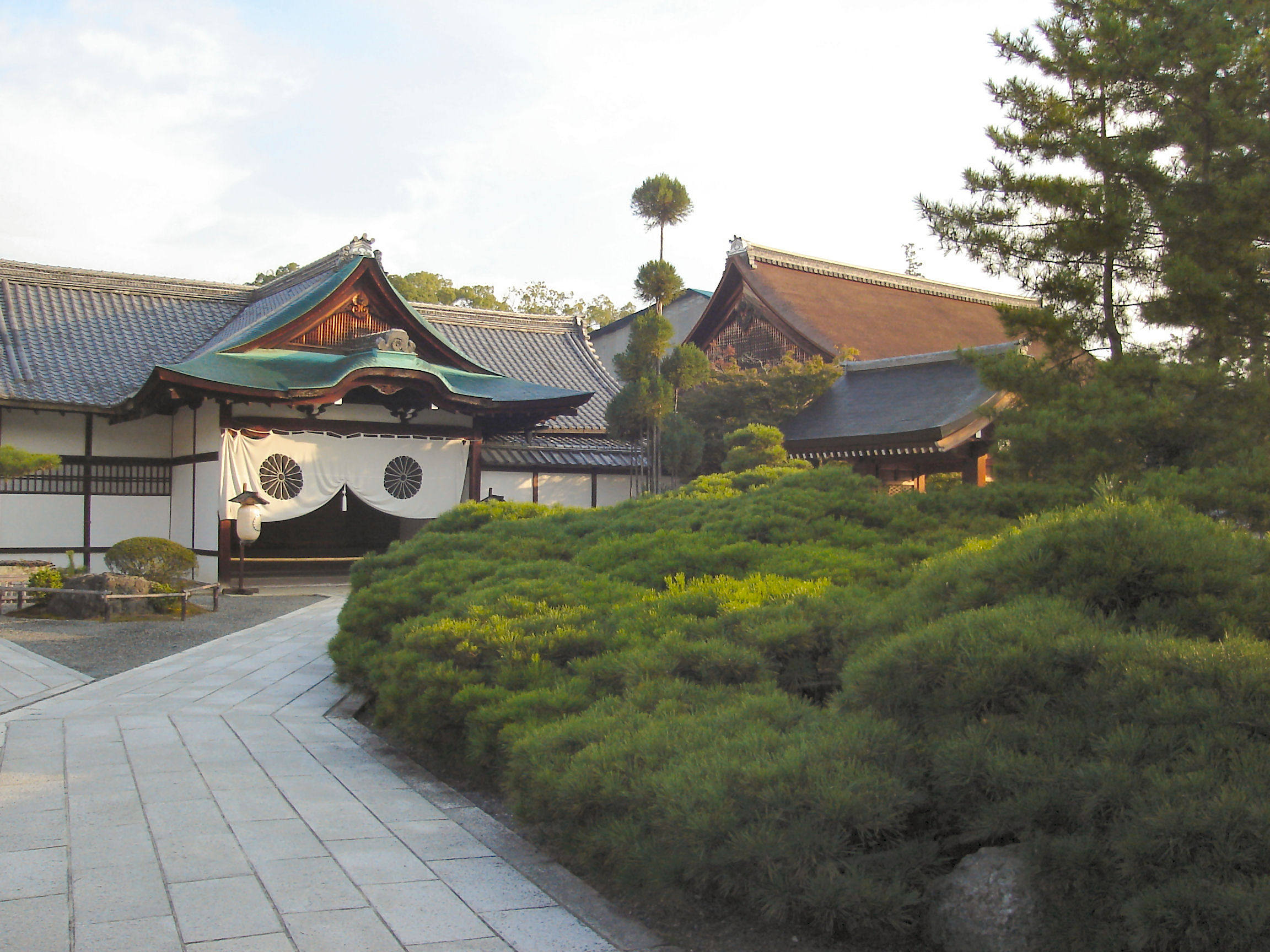
The Shikidai Genkan entrance to Daikaku-ji

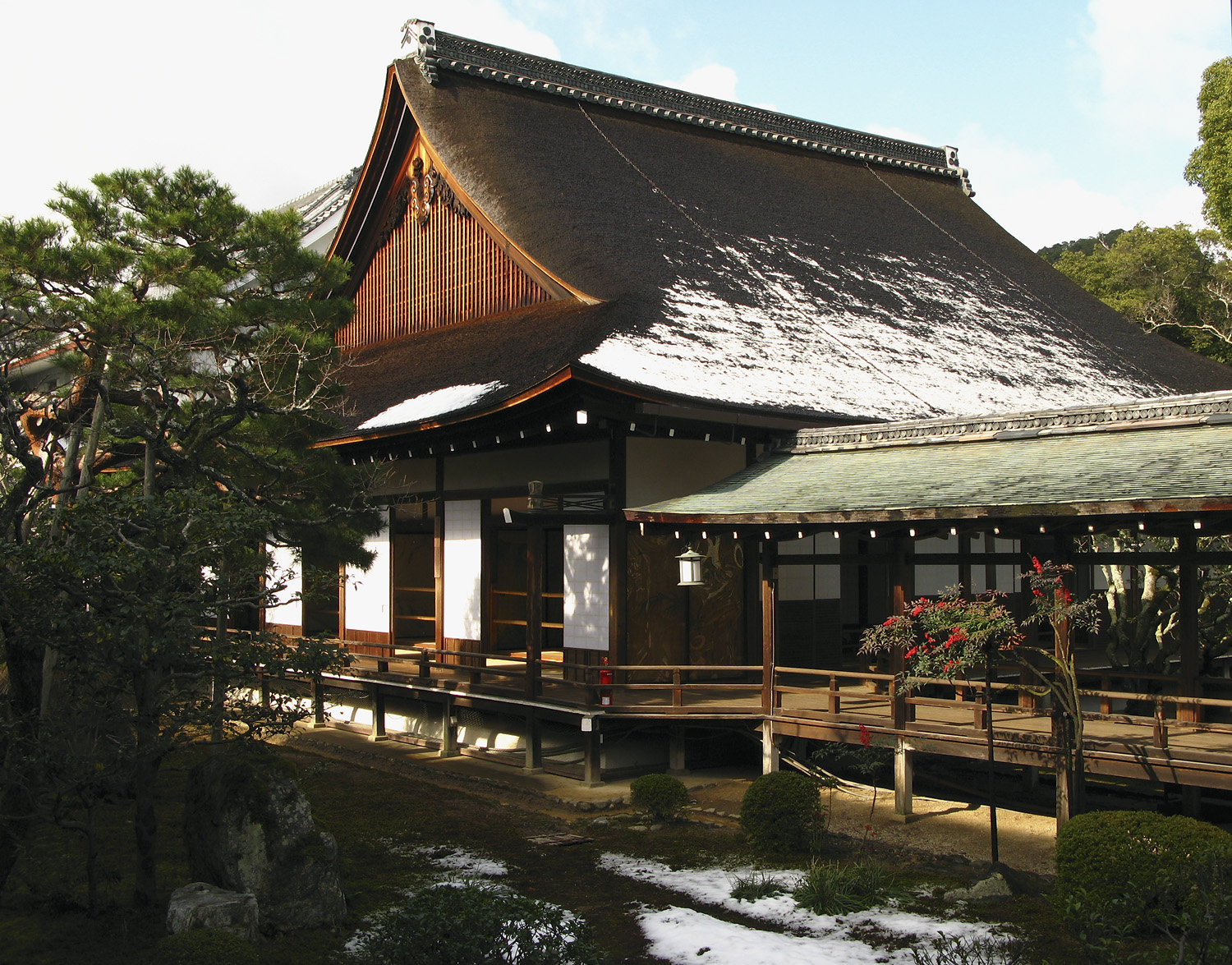
The Shōshinden is a Momoyama period building with a replica of the chambers where retired Emperor Go-Uda conducted cloistered rule

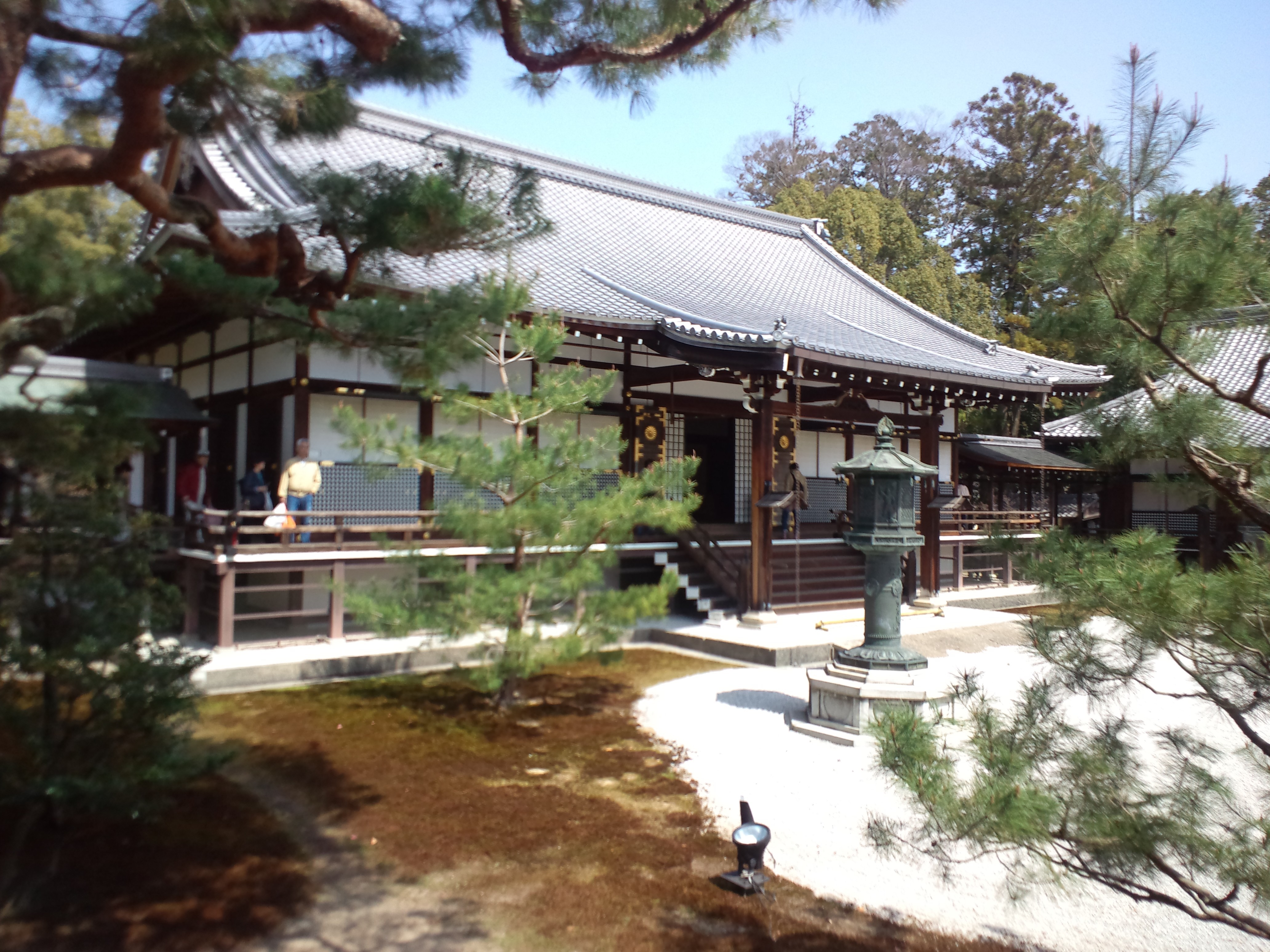
The Miedō hall

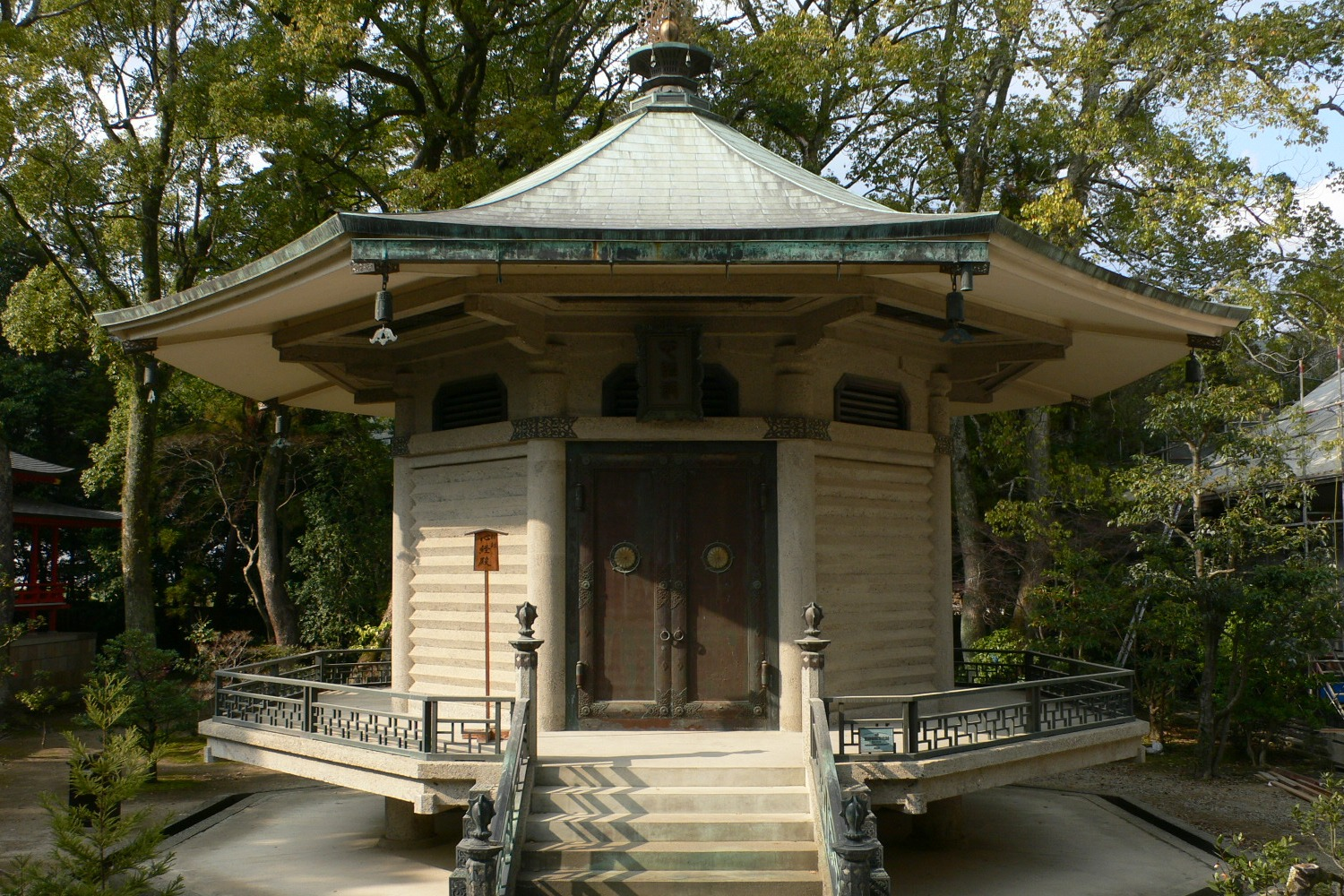
The Shingyōden hall where the Heart Sutra is kept

Daikaku-ji (大覚寺, Daikaku-ji) is a Shingon Buddhist temple in Ukyō-ku, a western ward in the city of Kyoto, Japan. The site was originally a residence of Emperor Saga (785–842 CE), and later various emperors conducted their cloistered rule from here. The Saga Go-ryū school of ikebana has its headquarters in the temple. The artificial lake of the temple, Ōsawa Pond, is one of the oldest Japanese garden ponds to survive from the Heian period.

== History ==
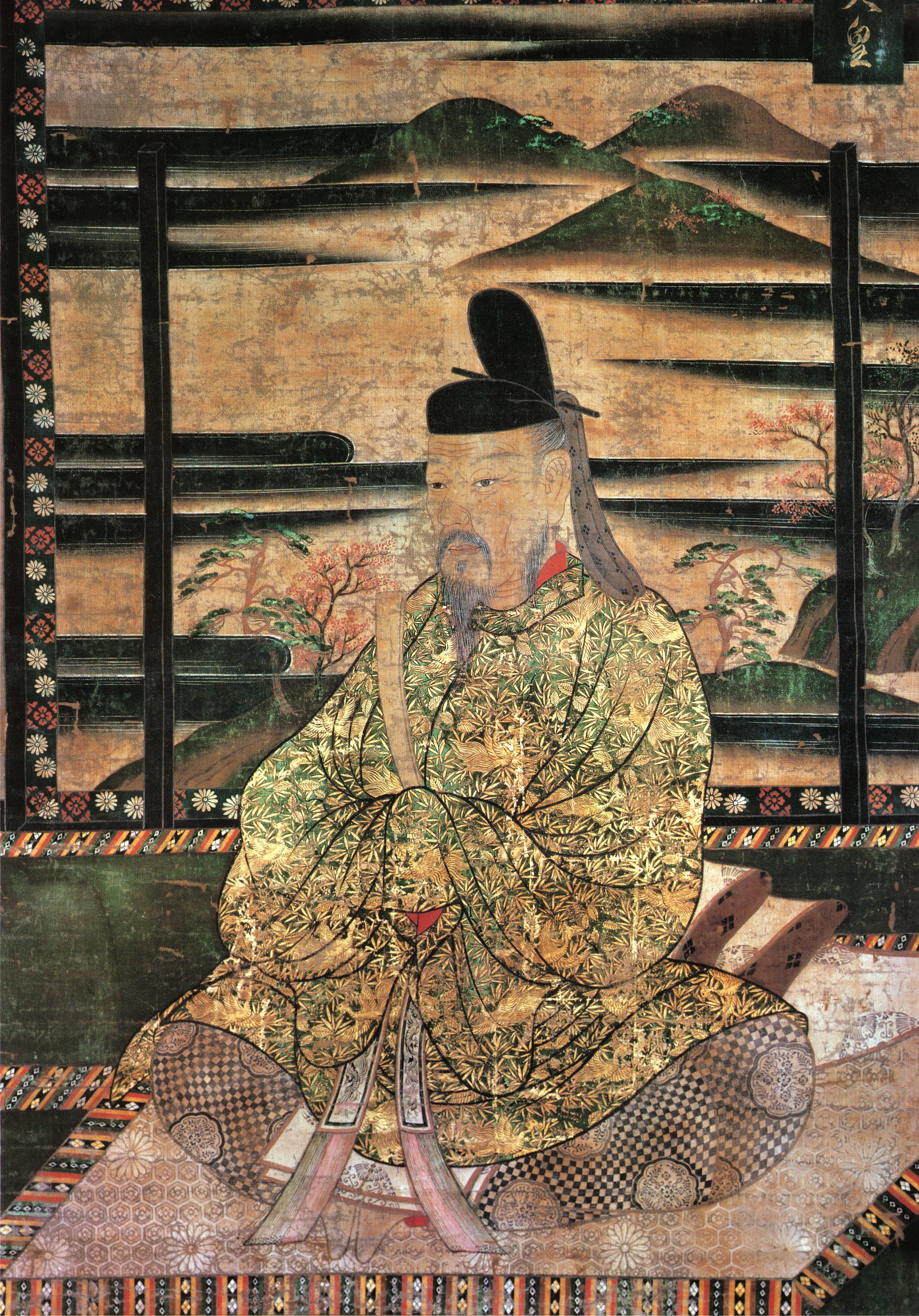
Emperor Saga

The origins of the temple dates back to the Heian period in the year 814 CE, when Emperor Saga had a palace, known as the Saga-in, constructed on the site. The palace later became his seat of retirement, known as Saga Rikyu imperial villa. According to tradition, when Japan suffered a serious epidemic, the Buddhist monk Kobo Daishi, the founder of Shingon Buddhism, suggested that the Emperor Saga personally copy an important Buddhist religious document called the Heart Sutra (Hannya Shingyō). The emperor made a handwritten copy, and the epidemic is said to have ended. The handwritten sutra is kept at the Shingyōden hall of the temple, and is displayed to the public once every sixty years, the next time being in 2078. Pilgrims still come to the temple to make copies of the sutra, which are kept in the temple with the original.

In 876, thirty-four years after the death of Emperor Saga, his daughter Princess Masako (正子内親王; 810–879), who was consort of Emperor Junna, turned the complex into a temple and gave it the name Daikaku-ji. It was a monzeki temple (門跡), which means by tradition that only imperial princes were appointed abbot of the temple. Over the years, it became the retirement home of several emperors. In the 13th and 14th centuries the temple became the residence of retired emperors such as Emperor Go-Saga, Emperor Kameyama and Emperor Go-Uda, who could be ordained as monks, but continued to wield power in what became known as cloistered rule.

In 1336, during the upheaval between the Kamakura period and the Muromachi period, the temple burned down, but was later rebuilt. During the Edo period, Emperor Go-Mizunoo brought in Momoyama period buildings from the Kyoto Imperial Palace. The temple was placed in a graveled courtyard next to the pond. The hondō, or main hall, and the Founder's Hall were also moved from the Kyoto Imperial Palace. The main images are of the Five Wisdom Kings, centered on Fudō.

The sliding door painting in the Okanmuri-no-ma room of the Shōshinden were painted by Kanō Sanraku and Shikō Watanabe. They feature peony trees and red and white plum blossoms. The hawk painted with Indian ink is a unique motif. The wooden beam above the doors has a painting of a hare. All these works of art are designated as Important Cultural Properties.

Tsujii Kōshū (辻井弘洲) (born 1872), who was one of Ohara Unshin's disciples from the Ohara-ryū school of ikebana, established his own school in the early part of the Taishō era. He was invited by Daikaku-ji to set up the Saga Go-ryū school in 1936.

== Pond and garden ==
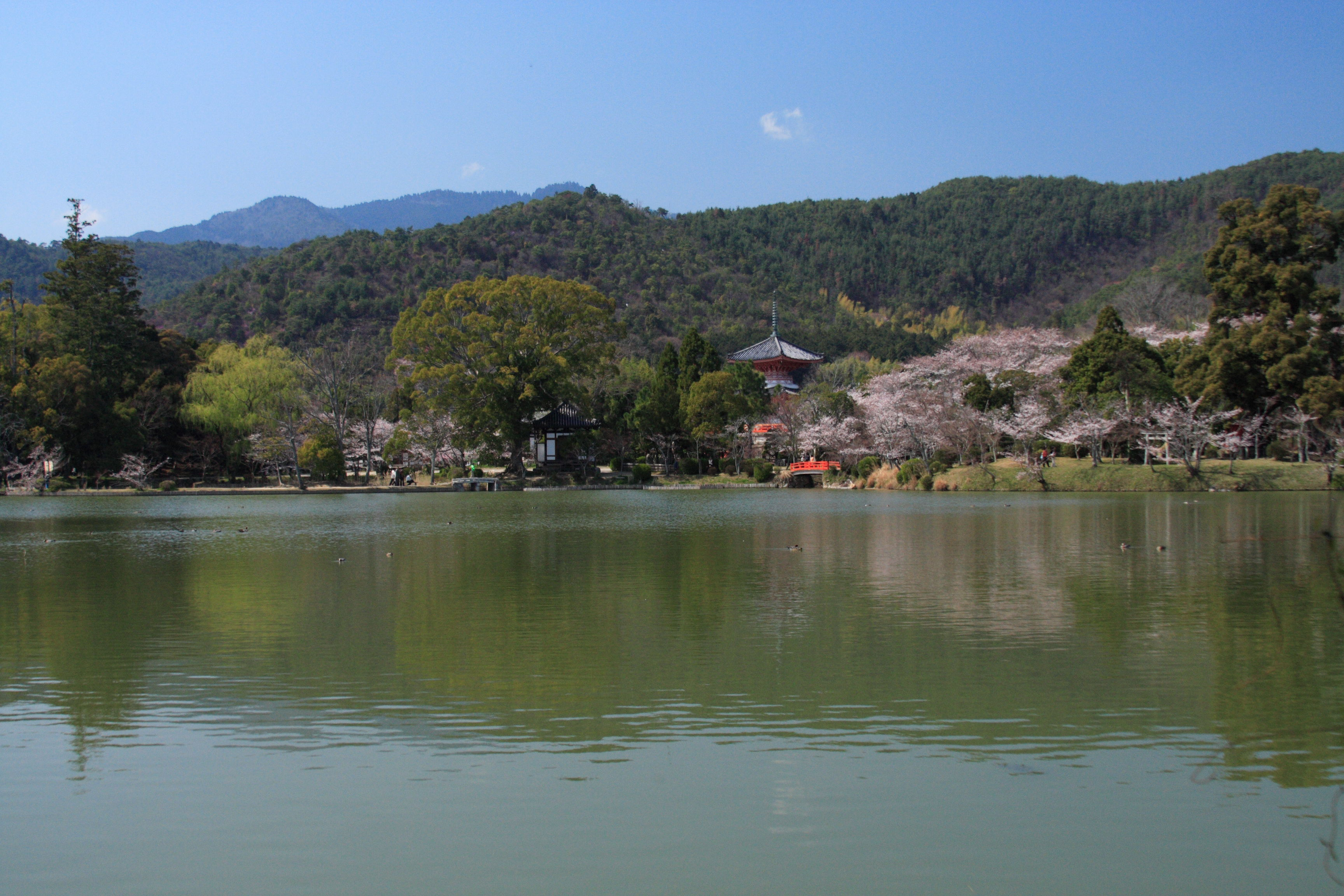
The Ōsawa Pond and surrounding garden date back to the Heian period

The Ōsawa Pond is older than the temple itself. It is an artificial lake of 2.4 hectares that was created by Emperor Saga, either during his reign (809-823) or between his retirement from power and his death in 842. The pond is supposed to reflect the outlines of Dongting Lake in China, which has a special significance in Chinese culture. It was an imperial garden of the style known as chisen-shuyu: a garden meant to be seen from a boat, similar to the Imperial Chinese garden of the period. The lake was created by damming a stream which came from the Nakoso waterfall. At the north end of the pond are two islands, one large and one small - the small island being known as Chrysanthemum Island. Between the two islands are several small rocky islets, meant to resemble Chinese junks at anchor. On a hillside north of the lake is what appears to be a dry cascade (karedaki), a kind of Japanese rock garden or zen garden, where a real waterfall is suggested by a composition of stones.

The garden was celebrated in the poetry of the period. A poem by Ki no Tomonori in an anthology from the period, the Kokinshū, described the Kiku-shima, or island of chrysanthemums, found in the Ōsawa pond.

I had thought that here
only one chrysanthemum can grow.
Who therefore has planted
the other in the depths
of the pond of Ōsawa?

Another poem of the Heian period, in the Hyakunin isshu, described a cascade of rocks, which simulated a waterfall, in the same garden:

The cascade long ago
ceased to roar,
But we continue to hear
The murmur
of its name.

The pond and the flowers are therefore by tradition to said to be the birthplace of the Saga school of ikebana, which is named in honour of the emperor.

The lake was created as a particularly good place for viewing the rising of the moon from boats. It also became, and remains, a popular place for viewing the cherry trees in bloom around the lake. A moon-viewing party is held in the garden every autumn for three days, around the date of the harvest moon; it features costumed dancers and musicians and dragon boats in the style of the Heian period. Today the lake is a popular park for the city's residents.

In addition to the garden around the lake, there is a large courtyard garden between the buildings of the temple.

== See also ==
- Rokkaku-dō
- Enshō-ji (Nara)
- List of Buddhist temples in Kyoto
- List of National Treasures of Japan (ancient documents)
- List of National Treasures of Japan (writings)
