= Jinshan Island and West Lake =

1630 painting by Kanō Sanraku

- ja: 金山西湖図屏風
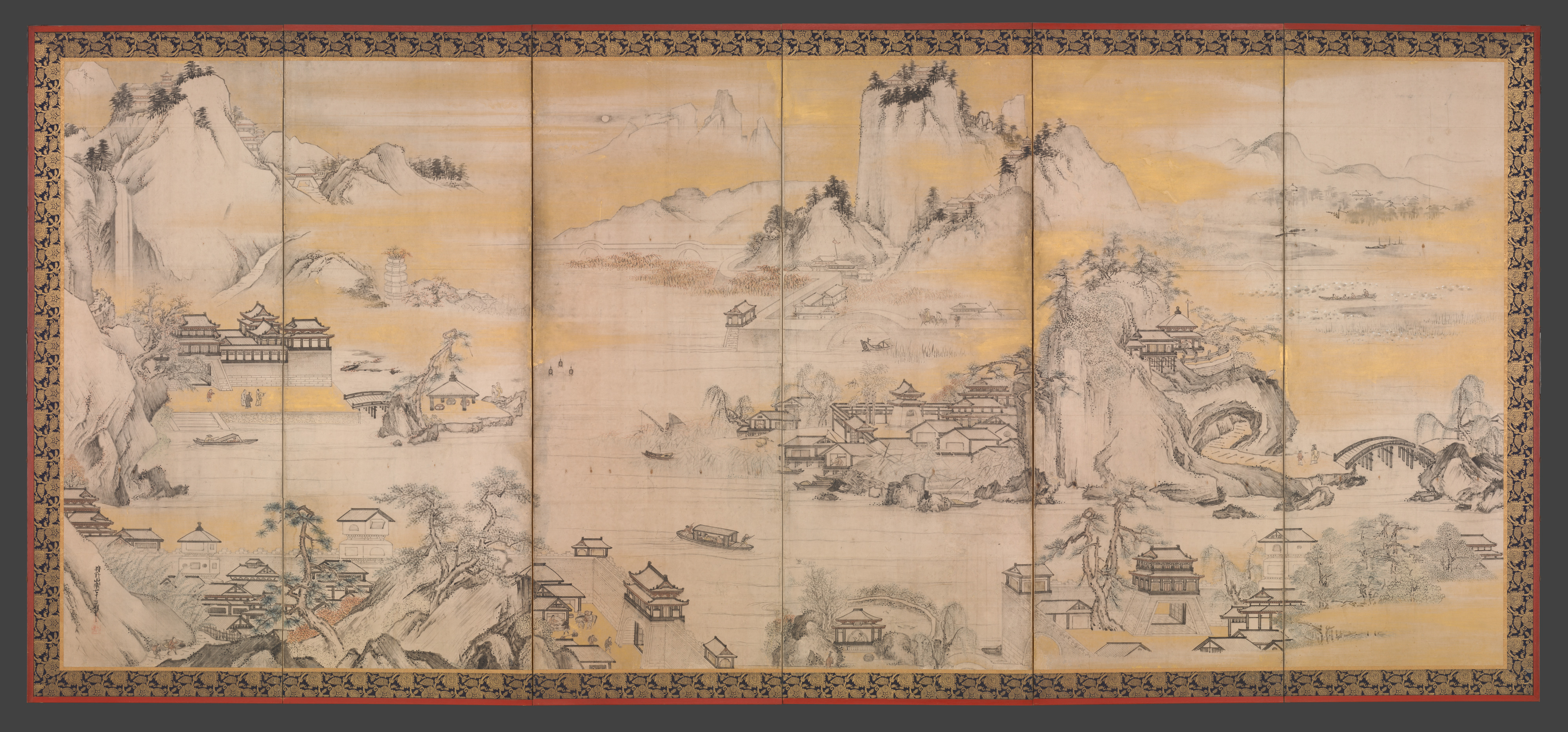
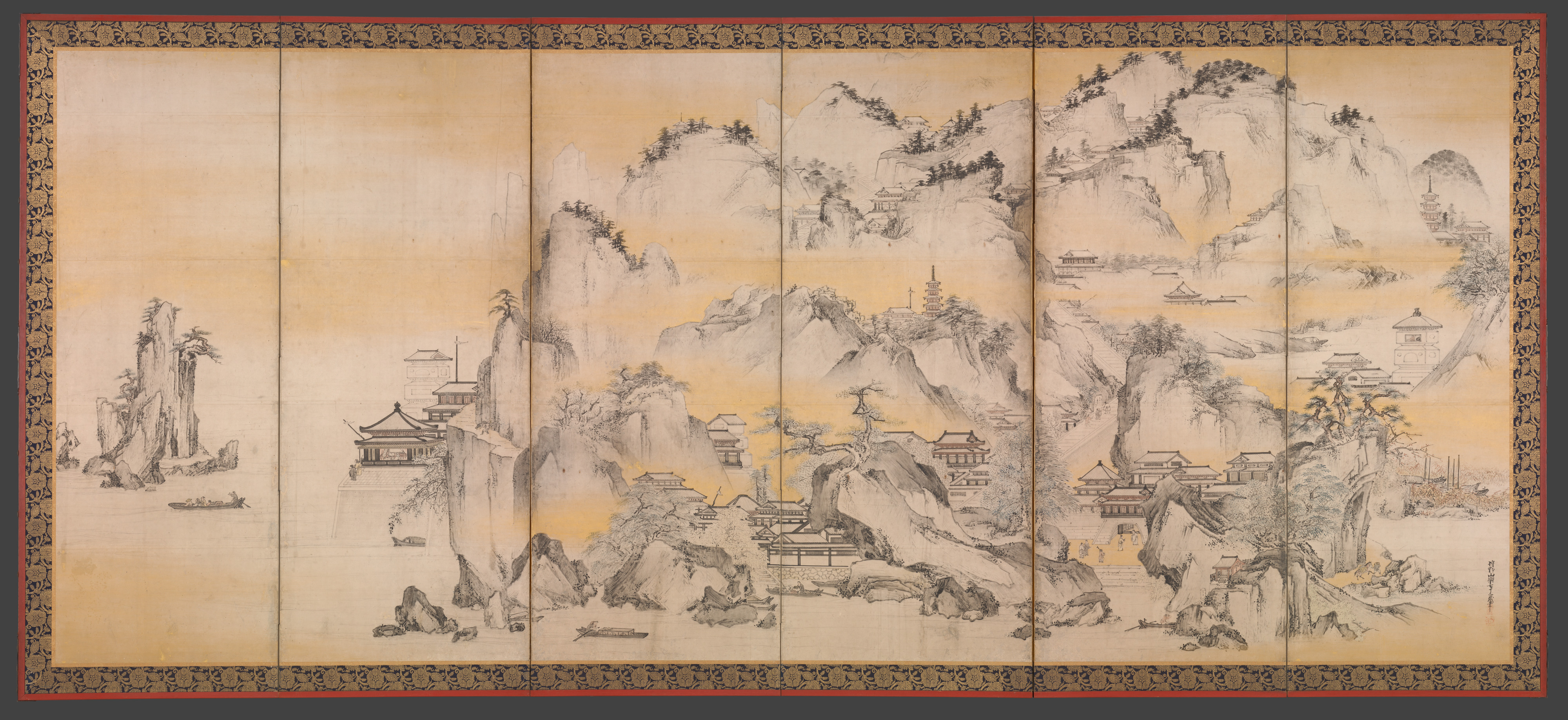
- Artist: Kanō Sanraku
- Year: 1630
- Medium: Six-panel byōbu (folding screen); Ink, paint and gold on paper
- Dimensions: 152.5 cm × 358.2 cm (60.0 in × 141.0 in)
- Location: Metropolitan Museum of Art, New York
- Accession: 2015.300.74.1, .2

Jinshan Island and West Lake (金山西湖図屏風) is a painting on six Byobu folding screens by Japanese artist Kanō Sanraku, the master of the Kano painting school. The artwork was created with ink, paint, gold and paper. It is part of the collection of the Metropolitan Museum of Art in New York City. Both are created with gold powder.

== Contents ==
Both parts of the screen depict the image of mountains and islands among the water and fog. They depict two geographically-distant and separate locations of eastern China. On the right side of the screen is Mount Jinshan located on the Yangtze River, near the city of Zhenjiang in southern Jiangsu province. Included in that painting are numerous bridges, roads and paths where people from all walks of life intersect.

On the left side is West Lake, outside the city of Hangzhou. Sanraku depicted the walls and gates of this city in the foreground in the left corner. Buddhist monasteries and places of worship were built in the area of the West Lake (some of them can be found on the mural of the screen), which attracted many pilgrims. Many poets, scholars, and artists also lived there. West Lake often appeared on the works of artists from the Southern Song. Sanraku added an iconographic ten species of West Lake for painting, which then became the motive of Chinese poetry and painting during the 12th and 13th centuries.

Among Japanese works of art before Sanraku, the most famous was a vertical scroll attributed to Sassu. It later became clear that the author was his student Suugetsu. It is known that Sassu made a trip to West Lake, while Japanese artists of the Muromachi and Edo periods could create their works based solely on the works of their predecessors or on illustrations from books. Only a few images of West Lake by Japanese artists contain ten species.

On both parts of the painting, from right to left, the seasons from spring to winter are portrayed. Both parts are combined using gold to create mist, water and parts in the background. Gold is worked to soften the composition of the transition from one type to another.

The seals of the artist, standing on the screen, indicate that the artwork was created at around 1630. At that time, Kanō Sanraku worked on murals at the Myoshinji Monastery in Kyoto, along with his adopted son, Kanō Sansetsu.
