= Kanō Einō =

Japanese painter (1631–1697)

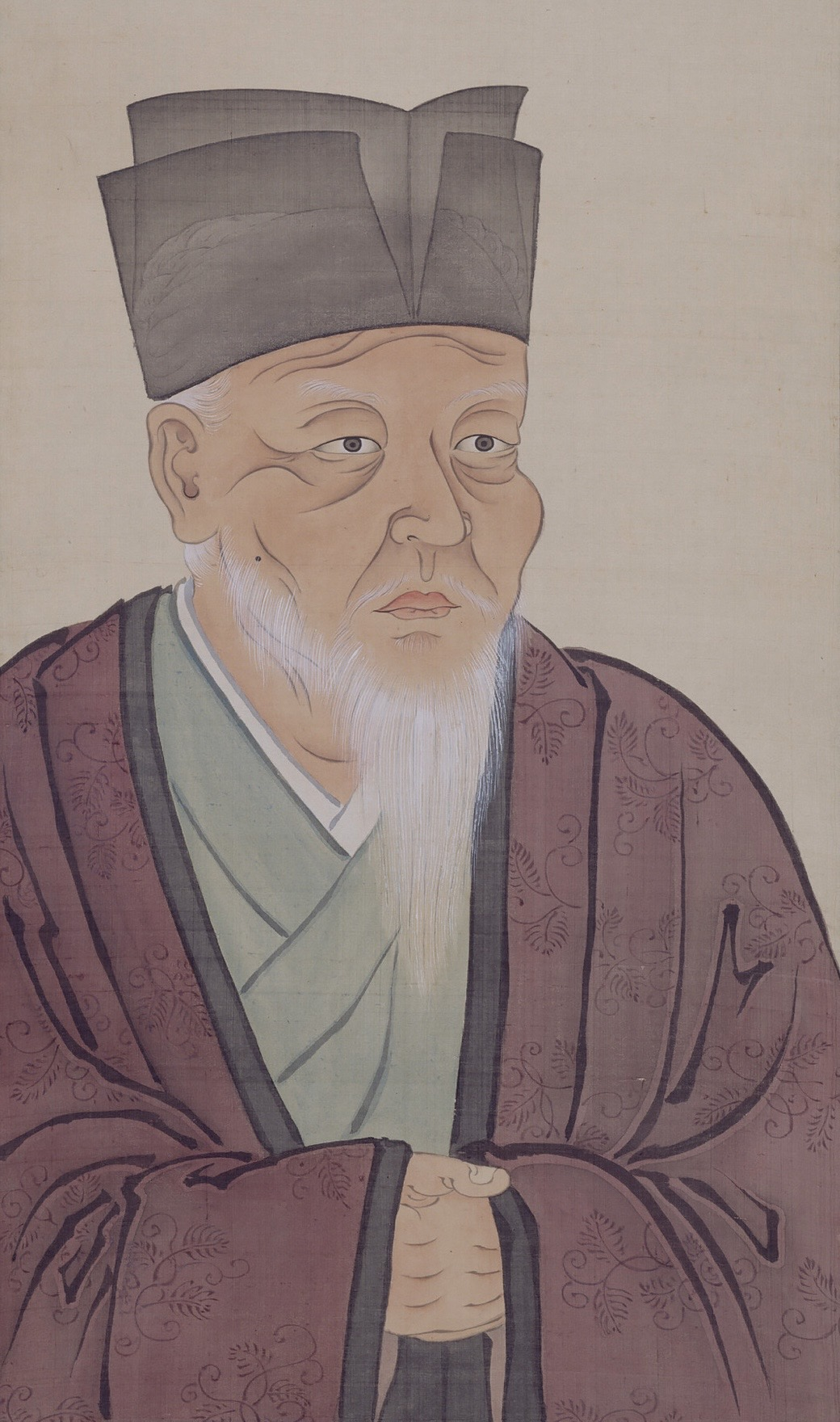
Portrait of Kanō Einō

Birds and Flowers of Spring and Summer, byōbu folding screen, late 17th century, 1,530 mm × 3,610 mm

Kanō Einō (狩野 永納, 1631–1697) was a Japanese painter of the Kyō-ganō sub-school of the Kanō school of painting. He became head of the Kyō-ganō upon the death of his father Kanō Sansetsu, and his grandfather was the Kyō-ganō's founder Kanō Sanraku. Einō compiled the Honchō Gashi (本朝畫史, "Japanese painting history"), the earliest serious art-historical work in Japan.

== Life and career ==
Einō was born in Kyoto 1631 (Kan'ei 8) to Kanō Sansetsu and the daughter of Kanō Sanraku, Take (竹). His father succeeded Sanraku as head of the Kyō-ganō sub-school of Kanō artists who remained in Kyoto after the school relocated to Edo (modern Tokyo) to paint for the Tokugawa shogunate. Einō learned painting from his father and inherited the position of head of the Kyō-gano on his father's death in 1651.

More than as a painter Einō is remembered as editor of the Honchō Gashi (本朝畫史, "Japanese painting history"). The work is considered the earliest serious art-historical work in Japan and has been a fundamental source for researchers. It provides biographies of over 400 artists from as far back as ancient Japan. Einō completed the Honchō Gashi probably by 1678; a shortened version appeared in 1691 in five woodblock-printed volumes entitled Honchō Gaden (本朝画伝, "Japanese painting traditions"), and the full work was published in 1693. Einō likely reworked material for this book his father had compiled earlier in the century, though the earlier work is only known to have covered a quarter of the artists who appeared in the Honchō Gashi.

Shunka kachō-zu Byōbu by Kanō Einō

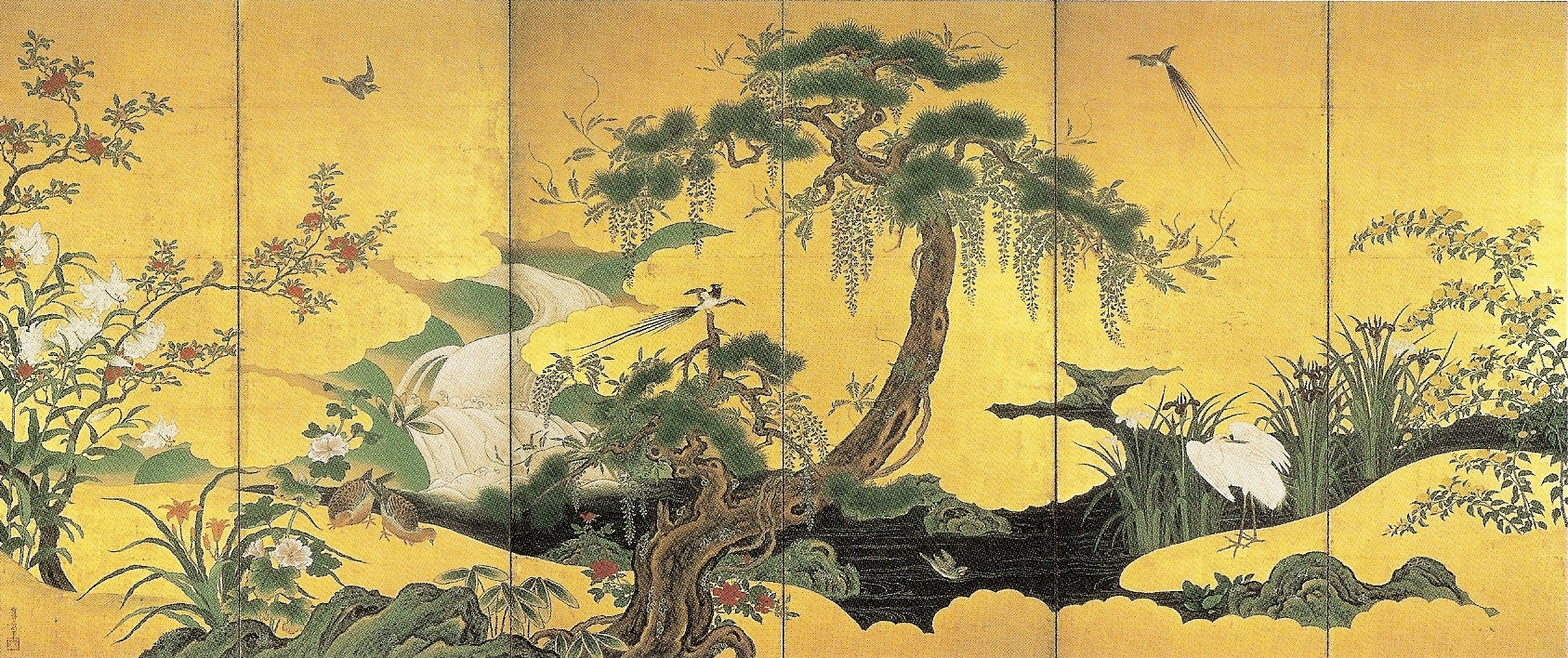

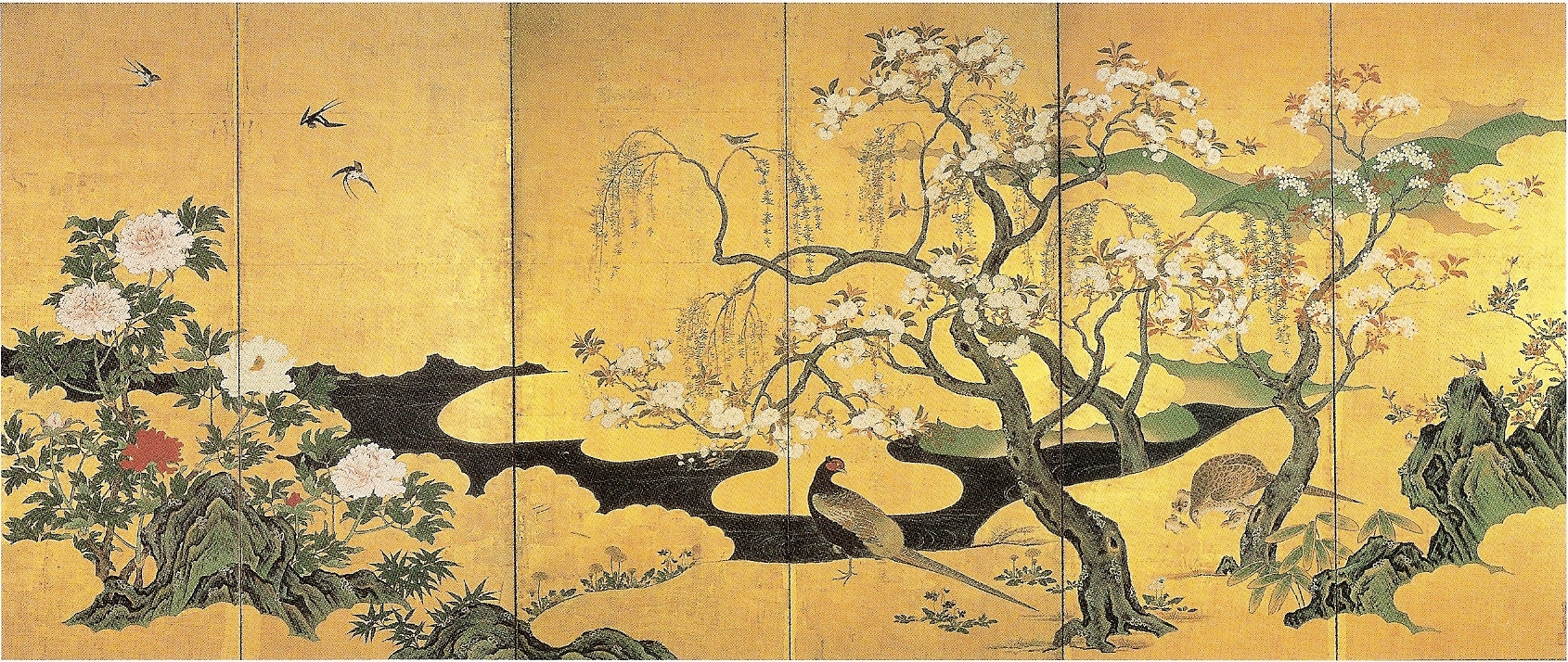

== Works cited ==
- Jordan, Brenda G. (2003). Copying the Master and Stealing His Secrets: Talent and Training in Japanese Painting. University of Hawaii Press. ISBN 978-0-8248-2608-6.
- Yamashita, Yūji (2004). Kanō-ha ketteiban 狩野派決定版. Bessatsu Taiyō. Heibonsha. ISBN 978-4-58292131-1. OCLC 64782262.
