= Watanabe Shikō =

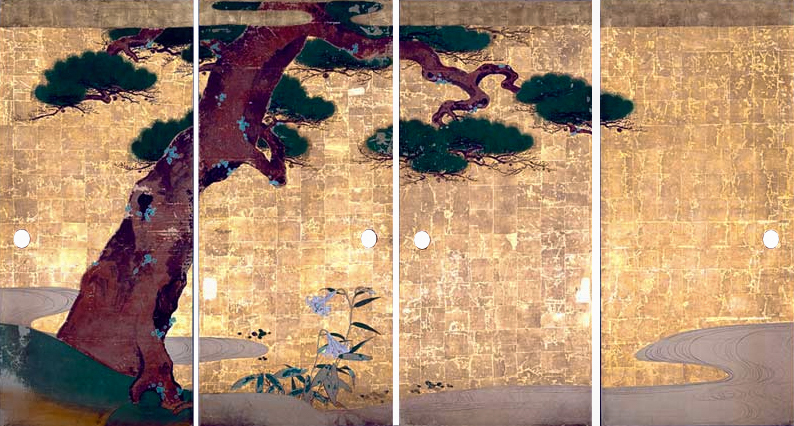
Fusuma with Pine and Lily

Watanabe Shikō or Motooki (渡辺 始興; 1683 - 5 September 1755) was a Japanese painter of the Rinpa school. Also known by his common name Kyūma, his other art names included Shōken (松軒) and Soshin (素信).

== Life and work ==
Watanabe was born in 1683, in Kyoto. The first reliable reference to Watanabe comes from a diary belonging to the Konoe family, dating from 1708. Based on this entry, it may be inferred that he was a rōnin who entered the employ of Konoe Iehiro. Another source was a notebook kept by a Samurai doctor named Yamashina Dōan, which dealt with Konoe's activities and mentions Watanabe four times. This notebook was later lost in a fire.

In 1717, he was known to be in the Imperial service. In 1735, he completed copies of a set of scrolls known as the Kasuga Gongen Genki, dating from the kamakura period, which are now kept in the Yōmei Bunko, an historical archive in Kyōto. This was followed by large format pictures, displaying the development of his personal style.

His earliest works are done in the style of the Kanō School, then show the influence of Ogata Kōrin, so they can be approximately dated. Typical of the Kanō period are screens and wall paintings, for the Kombu-in Zen temple in Nara. His paintings for the fusumas (sliding doors) at the Daikaku-ji Buddhist temple in Kyoto are in the Ogata style.

Watanabe died on 5 September 1755, in Kyoto.

== Collections ==
Watanabe's works is held in the permanent collections of several museums, including the Brooklyn Museum, the University of Michigan Museum of Art, the Ashmolean Museum, the Metropolitan Museum of Art, the Suntory Museum of Art, the Cleveland Museum of Art, the British Museum, the Harvard Art Museums, the Artizon Museum, and the Detroit Institute of Arts.

== Sources ==
- Tazawa, Yutaka: Watanabe Shikō. In: Biographical Dictionary of Japanese Art. Kodansha International, 1981. ISBN 0-87011-488-3.
- Laurance P. Roberts: Shikō. In: A Dictionary of Japanese Artists. Weatherhill, 1976. ISBN 0-8348-0113-2.
