= Kanō Sanraku =

Japanese painter (1559–1635)

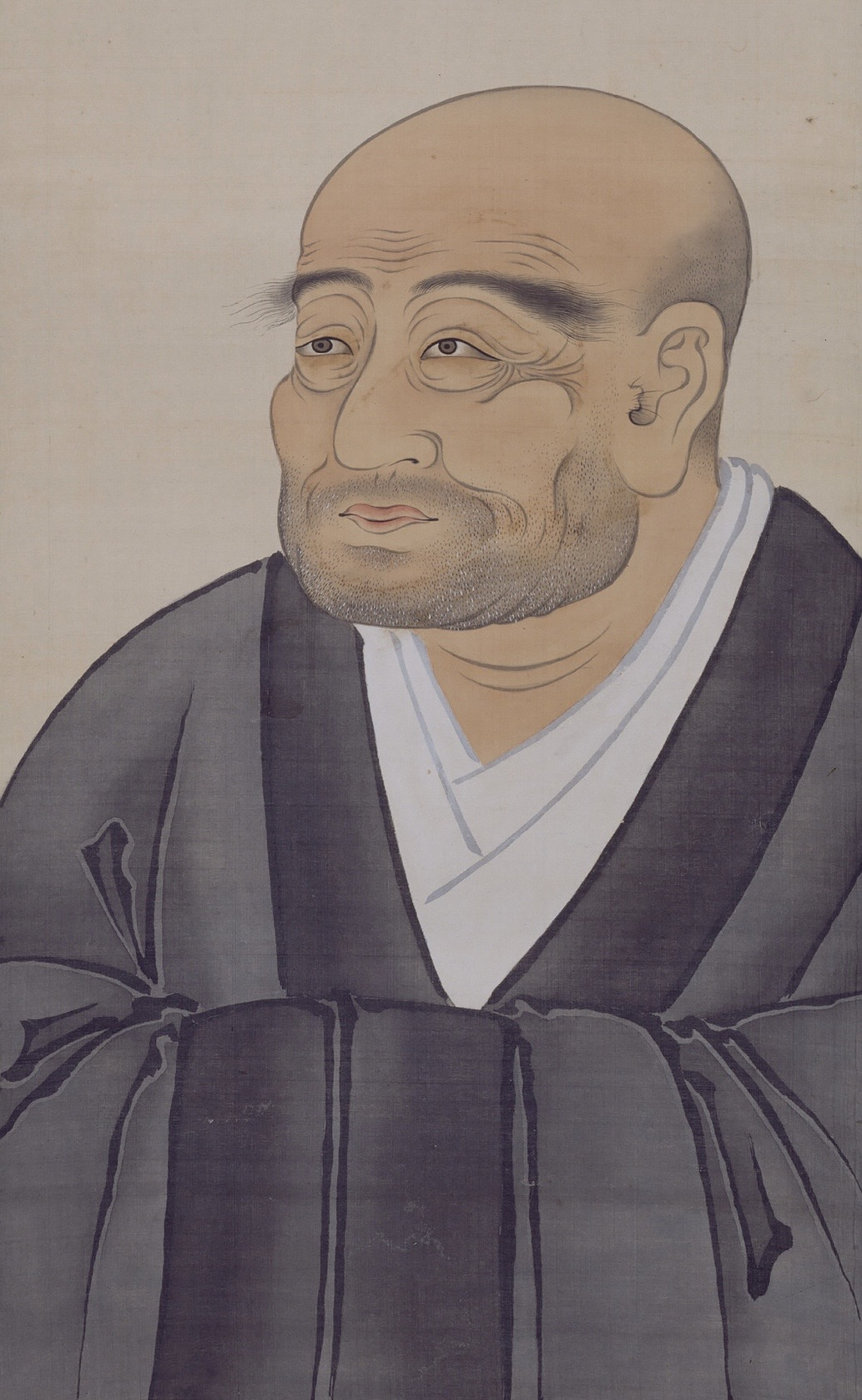
Kanō Sanraku

Kanō Sanraku (狩野 山楽; 1559 – September 30, 1635) was a Japanese painter also known as Kimura Heizō (his birth name), Shūri, Mitsuyori, and Sanraku. He was the sixth-generation member of the famous Kanō family of painters that served the Japanese shoguns. Sanraku's works combine the forceful quality of Momoyama work with the tranquil depiction of nature, and they have a more refined use of color typical of the Edo period.

== Life ==
His father was the painter Kimura Nagamitsu who flourished circa 1570, and he was born in Shiga Prefecture and died in Kyoto.

Sanraku worked as a page in the service of the "second unifier of Japan", Toyotomi Hideyoshi, in the 1570s. While in Hideyoshi's service, Sanraku's talent shined through and led to Hideyoshi introducing the young boy to the famed Kano artist school head artist of the time, Kanō Eitoku. Eitoku was so impressed by the young boy's skills that he adopted Sanraku, making him officially a part of the Kanō school. Originally named Kanō Mitsuyori, he later changed his name to avoid political persecution after the fall of the Toyotomi clan. He also went on to train and work closely with Kanō Sansetsu, even having Sansetsu marry his daughter and, after the loss of Sanraku's eldest son, making him Sanraku's heir by adopting him.

After Eitoku's death (1590), Sanraku became head of the Kanō school and remained busy taking commissions from Hideyoshi and his son, Toyotomi Hideyori, from 1590 to 1615. During this time the Toyotomi clan was focused on rebuilding Kyoto to its former splendor, before the Genpei Wars. This meant commissions from the Toyotomi clan were focused within their family castle (Momoyama Castle—original no longer surviving), reconstruction of Imperial imagery, and paintings for Buddhist temples and Shinto Shrines all around Kyoto. Though many of his primary commissions were in Kyoto at the time, most of the Kanō artists moved to Edo (often after a summons from the shōgun), but he continued to adhere to the brightly coloured style of the Momoyama period. His grandson, Kanō Einō, painted in the same style, but is better known for a biographical history of Japanese painting, which gave the Kanō school pride of place.

In 1615, the Tokugawa clan, specifically Tokugawa Ieyasu, solidified their domination over the Toyotomi clan in the Siege of Osaka. The murdering of his main patron, burning of works in Momoyama Castle, and general political turnover made Sanraku remove himself from Kyoto's artistic and social circles and took the tonsure, changing his name from Mitsuyori to the priestly Sanraku. During this time he spent secluded in remote country temples, but found his way back to Kyoto in 1619 at work on a commission form the shōgun Tokugawa Hidetada for fusuma (sliding door) panels to be used in the latest refurbishment of the imperial palace in preparation for the marriage of his daughter Tokugawa Kazuko to the emperor Emperor Go-Mizunoo. Sanraku continued to paint for the Tokugawa family for 15 years until his death in 1634.

== Style ==
Considered one of the most talented artists of the Kanō school, he continued to champion the dramatic style of his mentor, Eitoku. Though he retreated slightly from the dynamic imagery, substituting first a naturalism of expression and then a quality of elegant ornamentation, he skill pushed the revitalization of yamato-e through the gold-and-blue technique. However, like most Kanō artists of the period, he was still a master of painting in a variety of styles ranging from large works for decorating castles (like the two illustrated) to smaller monochrome kara-e derived from Chinese ink-wash painting. He mastered a true fusion of both kara-e and yamato-e, thus allowing him to align the Kano school with the second phase of painting within the Edo period. This phase of painting represented a more intellectual approach to pictorial content on the part of the artist—and often commissioner—whether it be reworking traditional yamato-e theme or interpreting complex and unfamiliar subjects from Chinese literature. This helped to reshape Japanese's artistic identity after being severely shaken during the war ridden Medieval Periods.

== Works ==
- Carriage Fight Scene from Hollyhock Chapter of the Tales of Genji; four surviving panels byōbu. Early 17th century. Color and ink on paper, 68 1/8 by 145 1/2 inches (173 cm × 370 cm). Tokyo National Museum
- Frolicking Birds in Plum and Willow Trees in Jokanninoma room of Tenkyuin Temple (a sub-temple of Myoshinji Temple). 17th Century. Four walls with eight doors and 18 panels, color and washi on paper and laid with gold leaf, http://global.canon/en/tsuzuri/works/30.html
- Tigers and Storms pair of screens
- Tigers in a Bamboo Forest on fusuma in Tenkyuin (a sub-temple of Myoshinji Temple). 17th century. Four walls with twenty sliding doors; East 4 panels: 190 by 141.7 centimetres (74.8 in × 55.8 in), West 4 panels: 189.5 by 141.2 centimetres (74.6 in × 55.6 in), South 4 panels: 178.8 by 83.6 centimetres (70.4 in × 32.9 in), North 4 panels: 184.8 by 94.8 centimetres (72.8 in × 37.3 in), North-center 4 panels: 184.8 by 66.7 centimetres (72.8 in × 26.3 in), Tenkyuin Temple, a subtemple of Myoshinji Temple
- The Three Laughing Men of the Valley of the Tiger, screen, color, India ink, and gold on paper. Tokyo National Museum.
- Jinshan Island and West Lake (1630)
Associated Images

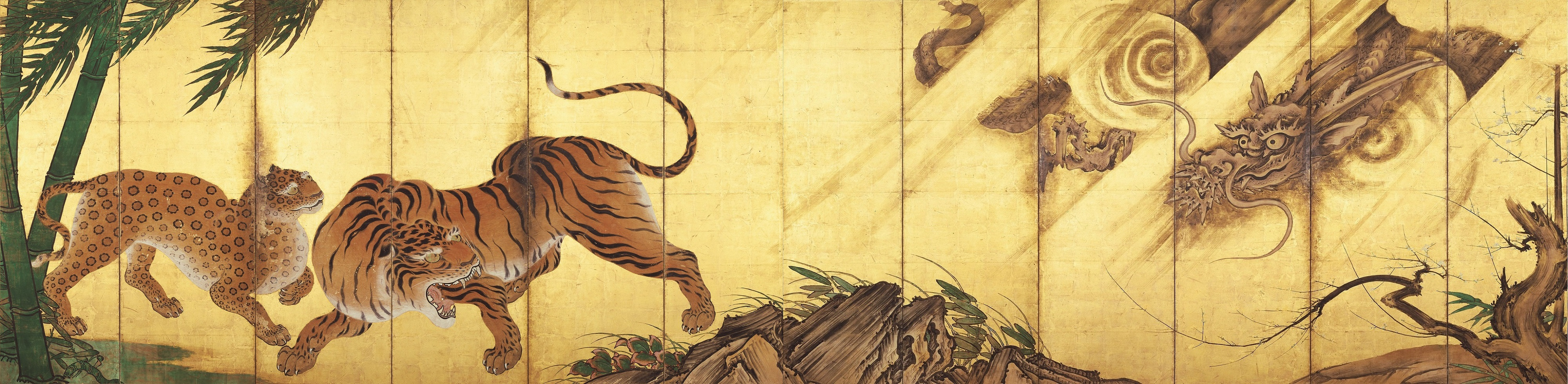

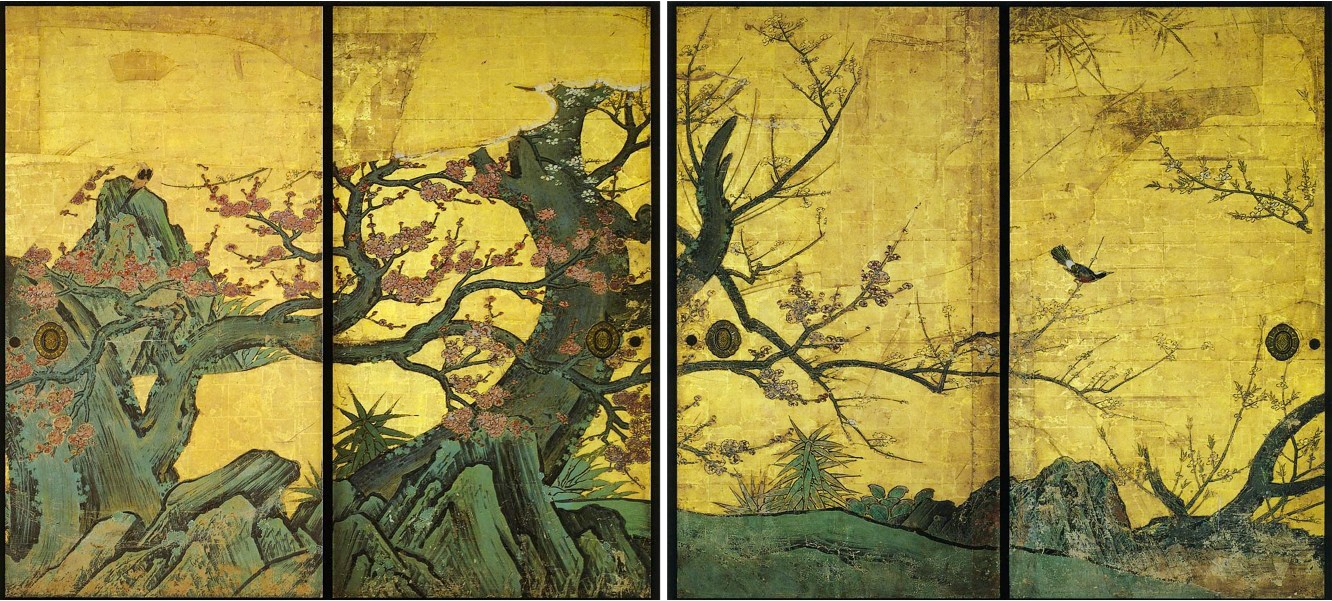

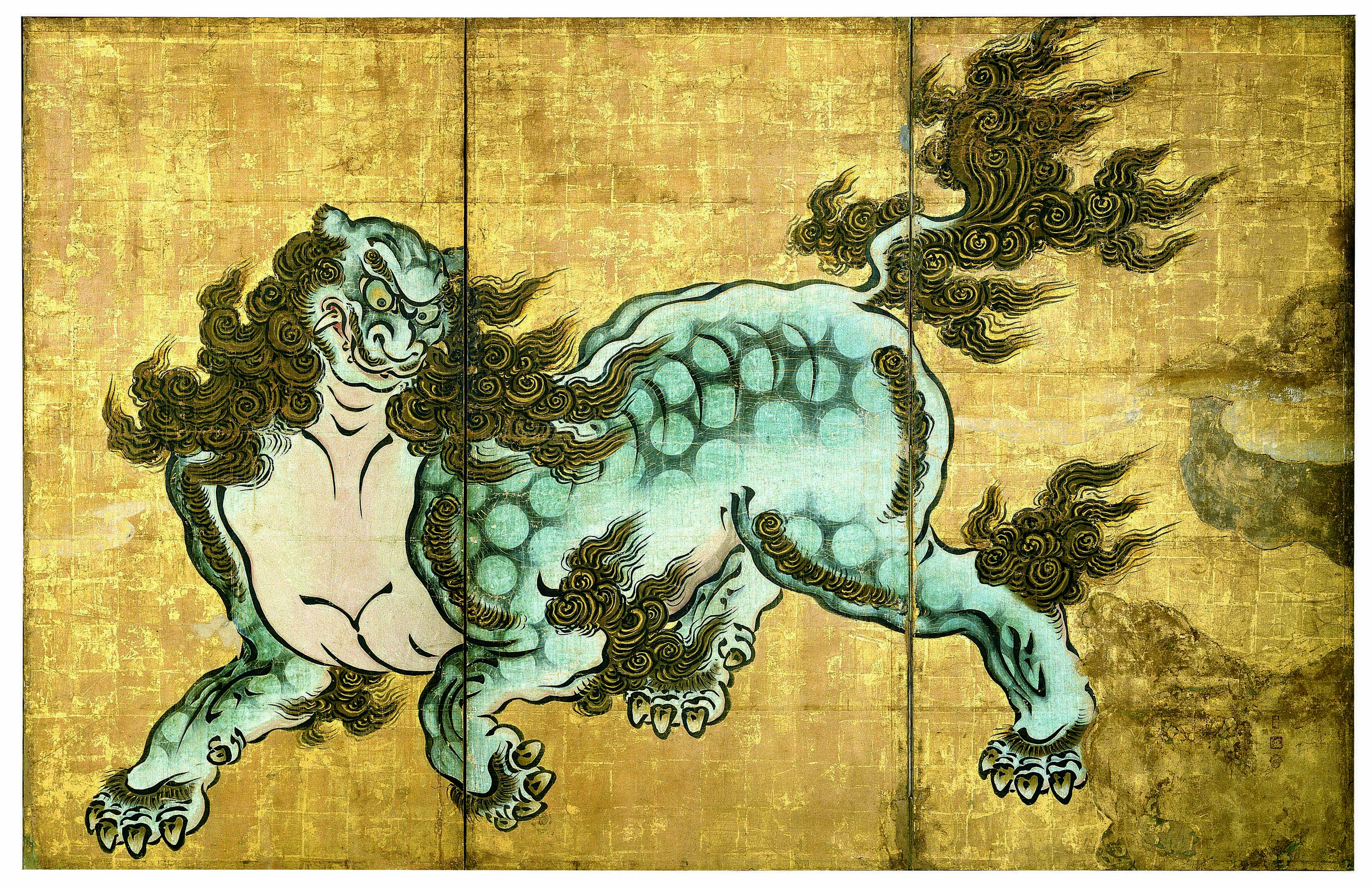

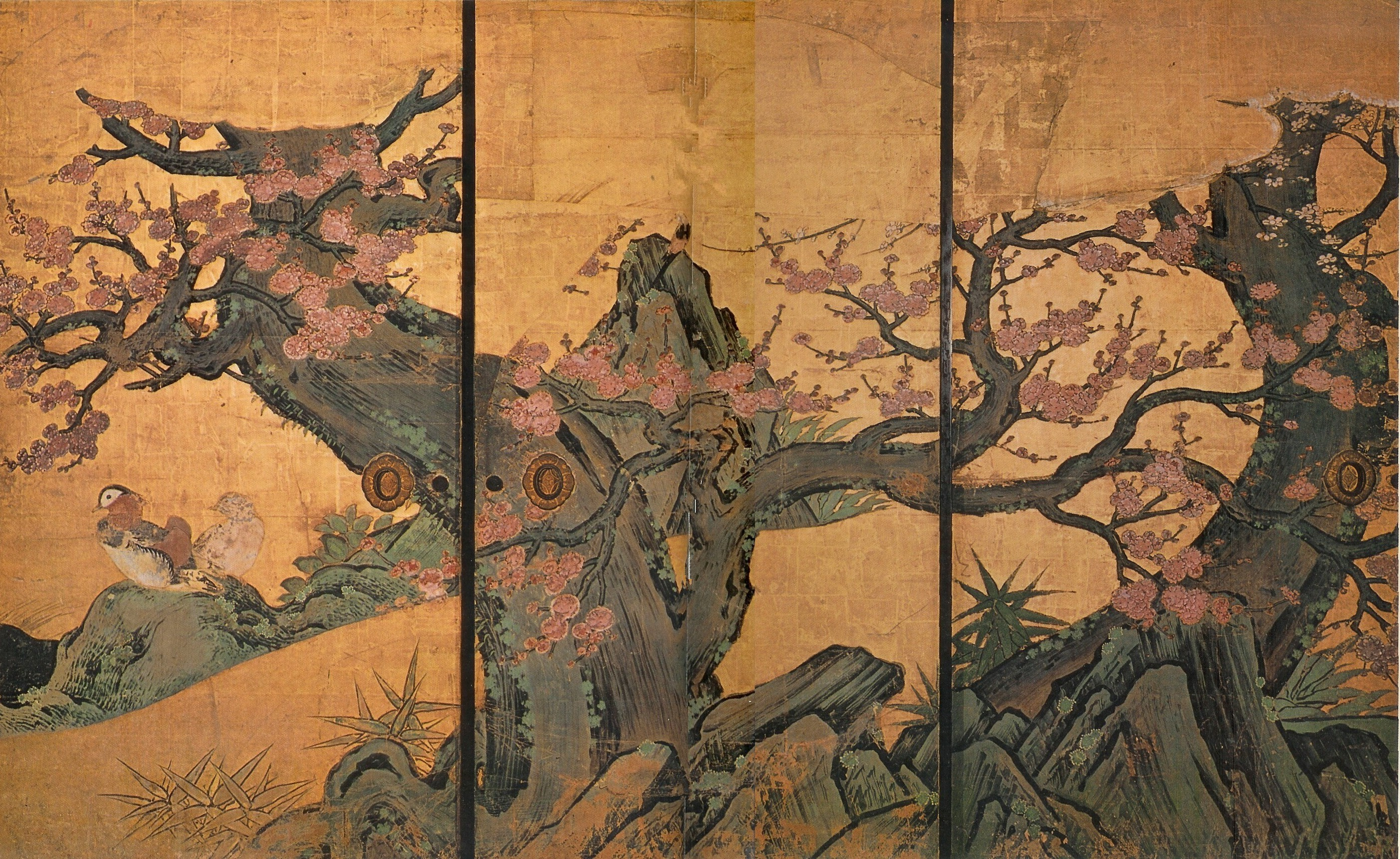

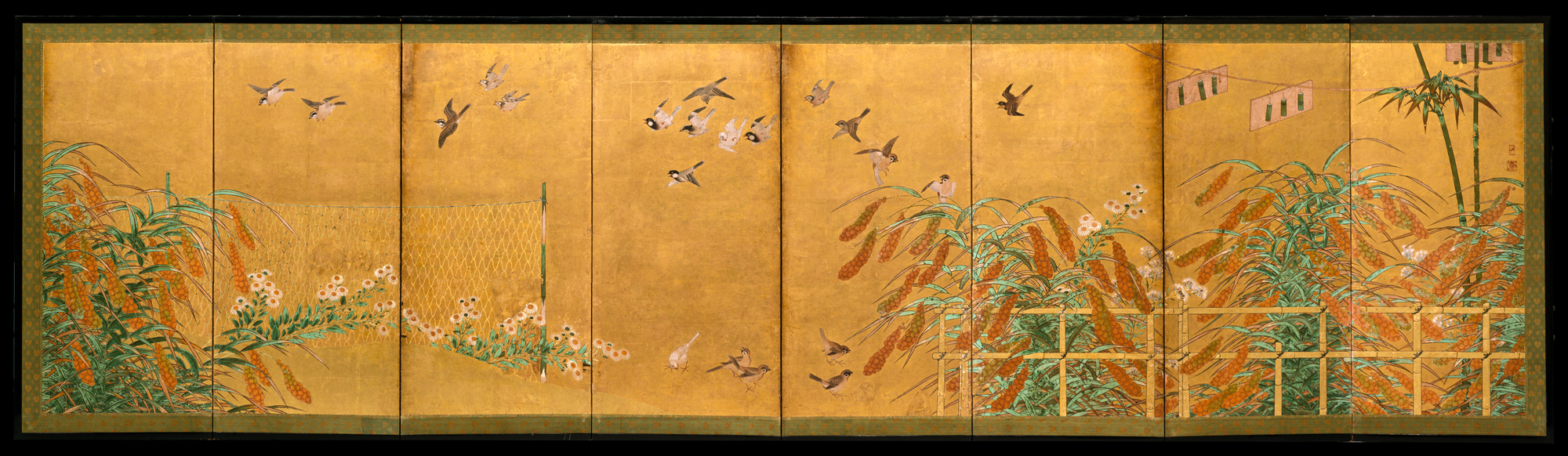

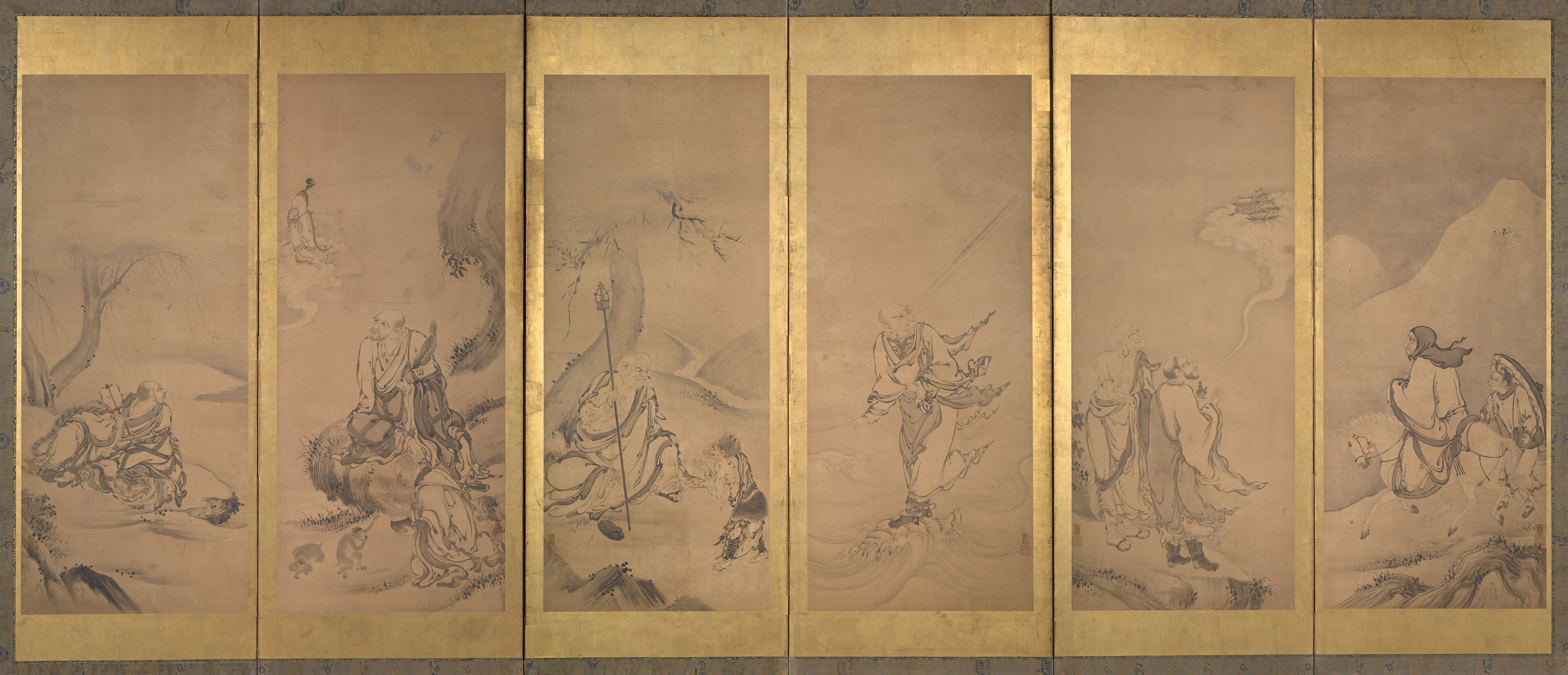
