= Kanō Sansetsu =

Japanese painter

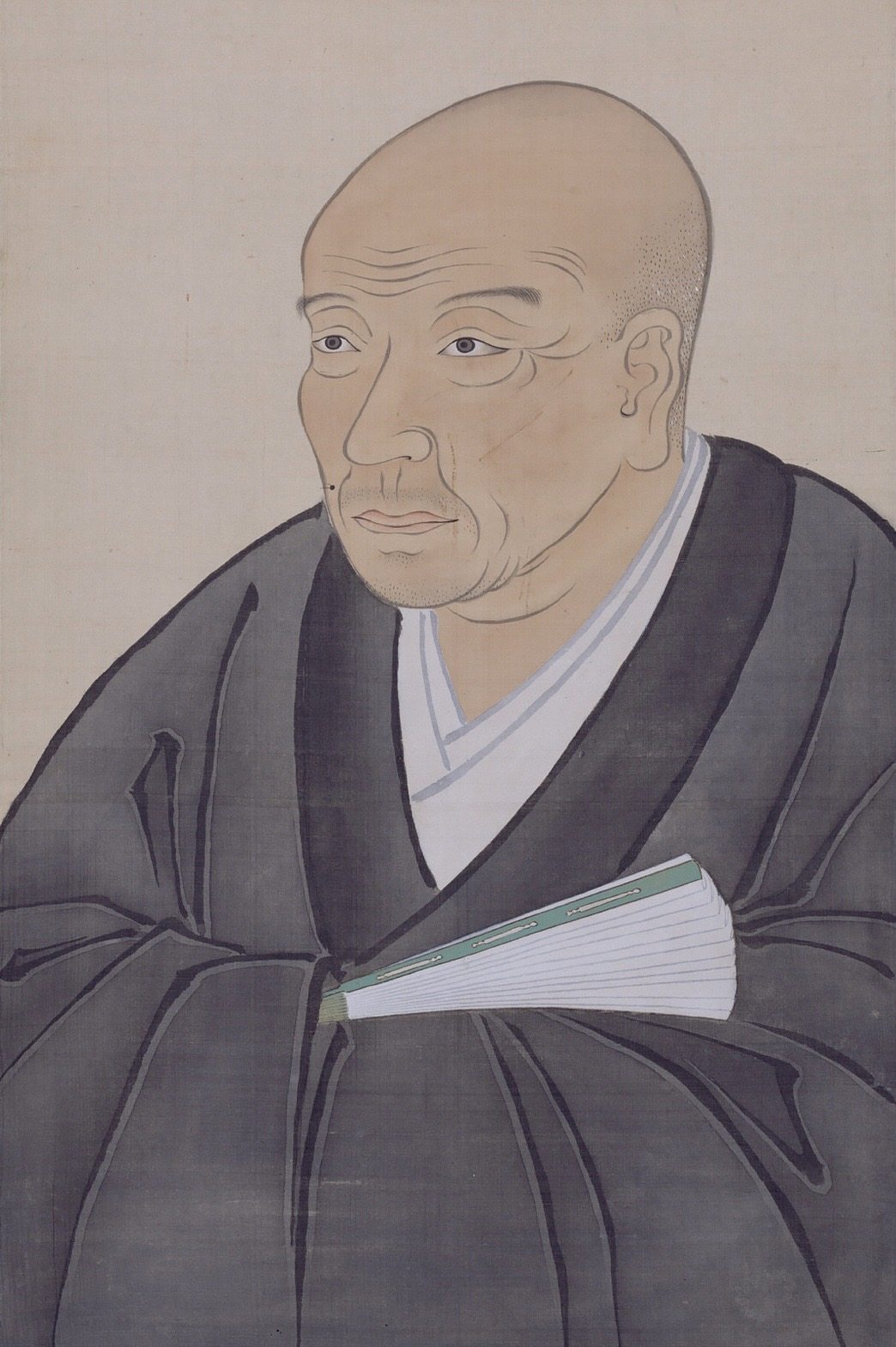
Portrait of Kanō Sansetsu

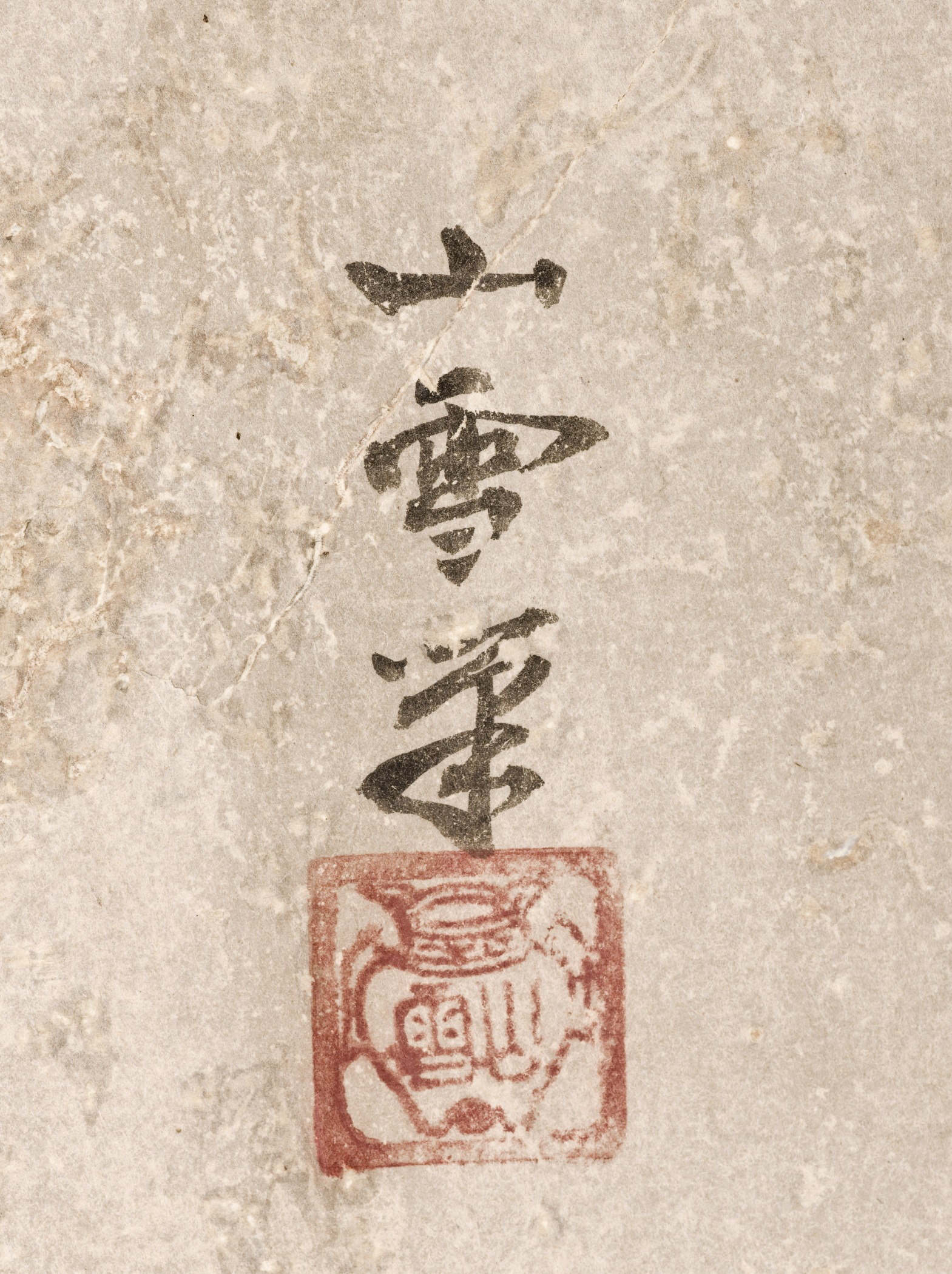
Sansetsu's Signature and Seal (山雪筆)

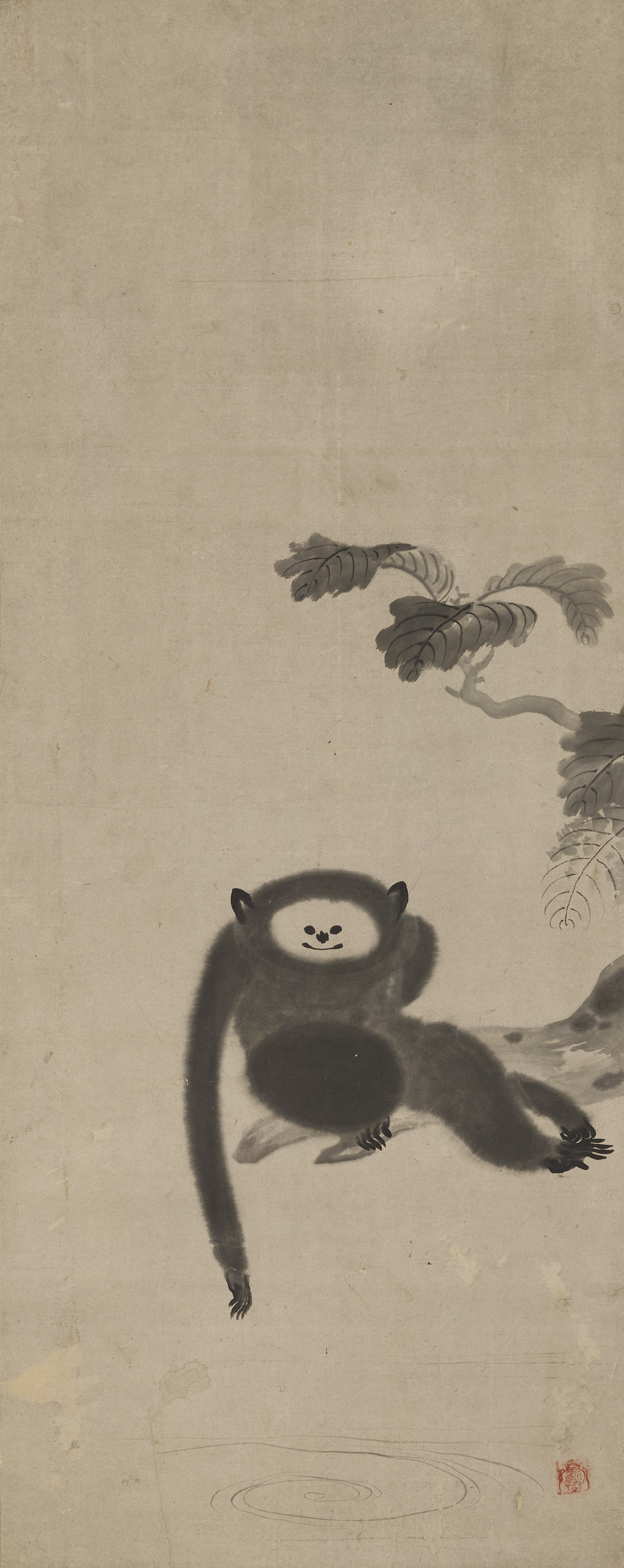
Monkey on a Branch. 1636.

Kanō Sansetsu (狩野 山雪; 1589–1651) was a Japanese painter also known as Kanō Heishiro. He was born in Hizen Province, Kyūshū, and died in Kyoto.

== Biography ==
Sansetsu was apprenticed to Kanō Sanraku, married his daughter, and was adopted by him after the death of Sanraku's eldest son. Later, he became the leader of the Kanō school. He was the father of Kanō Einō.

== Works ==
- Dragon in the clouds, hanging scroll, ink on paper.
- Huang Chuping, hanging scroll, ink on paper.
- Laozi, one of a pair of six-panel folding screens, ink on paper.
- Mount Fuji, hanging scroll, ink and gold on paper.
- The old plum ca. 1645, four sliding door panels (fusuma), ink, color, gold leaf on paper.
- Seabirds on a winter coast, screen, color, India ink, and gold on paper. collection hosotsugi, Kyoto.
- The ten snow incidents, one of a pair of six-panel folding screens, ink and light color on paper.
- Transcendent, hanging scroll, ink on paper.
- Two chickens on thatched roof, hanging scroll, ink and light color on paper.
- Xiwangmu (Seiobo), the Queen Mother of the West and Mu Wang (Bokuo), one of a pair of six-panel folding screens, ink on paper.

== Gallery ==
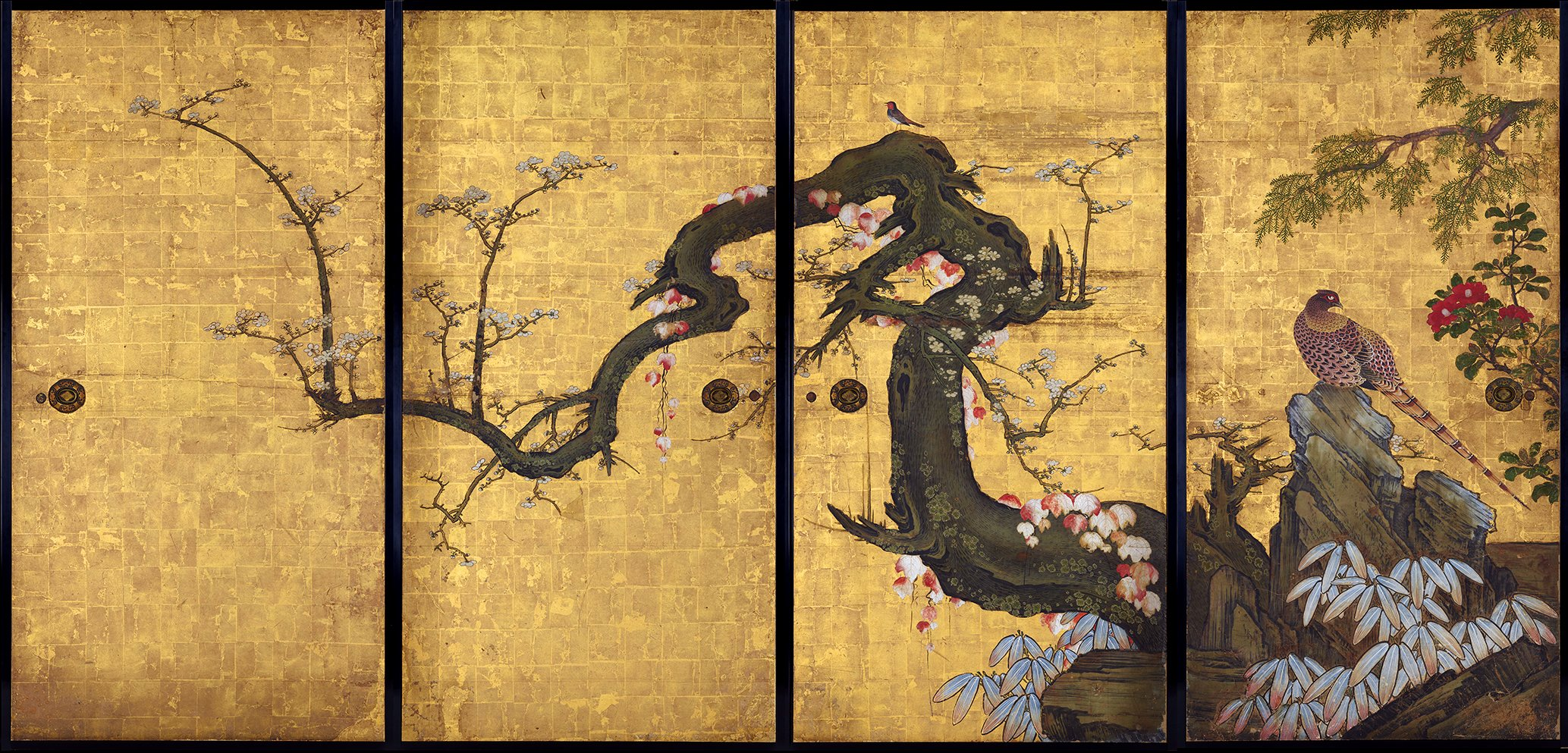
Frolicking Birds in Plum and Willow Trees, painted on four sliding doors, originally for a room at Myōshin-ji temple in Kyoto. 1631. Important Cultural Property.

The Old Plum, painted on four sliding doors, originally for a room at Myōshin-ji temple in Kyoto. 1646.

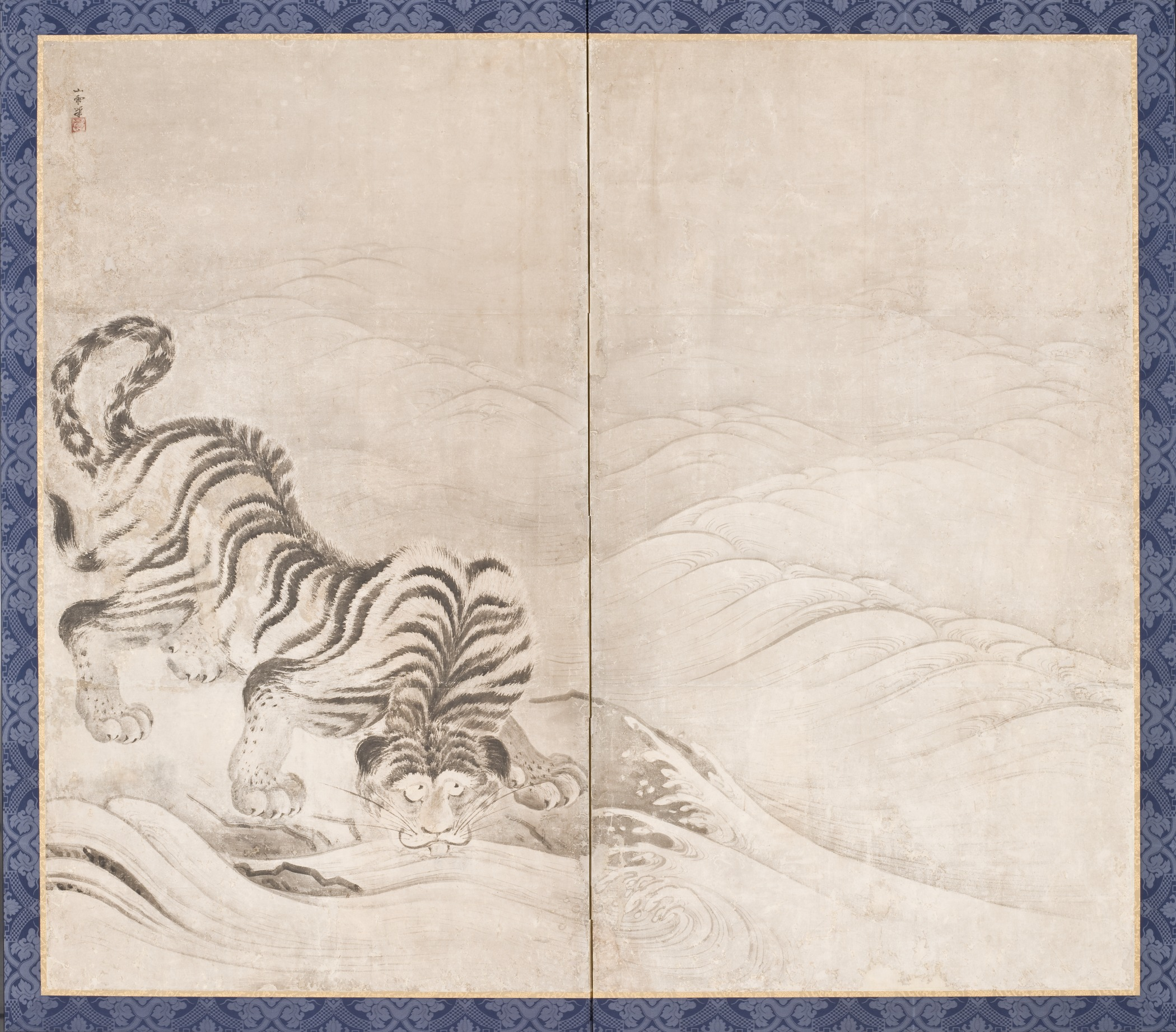
Tiger Drinking from a Raging River. Circa 1640.

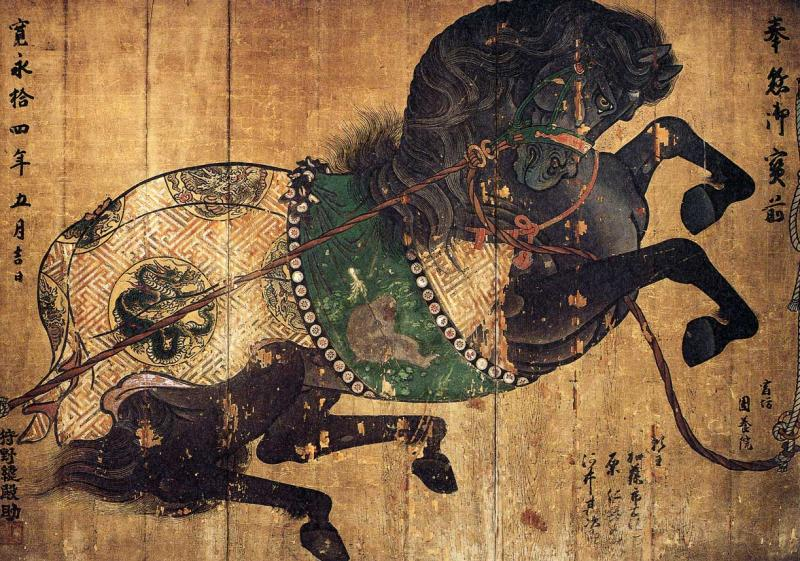
Bridled Horse, painted on a wooden ema tablet. 1632.

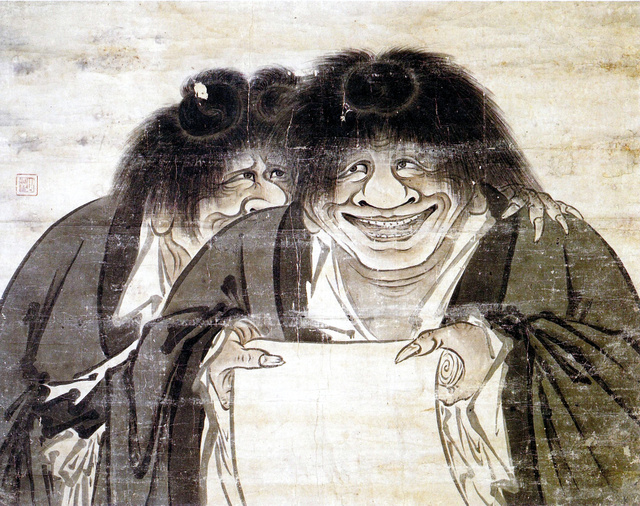
Han Shan and Shi De. Early 1600s. Important Cultural Property

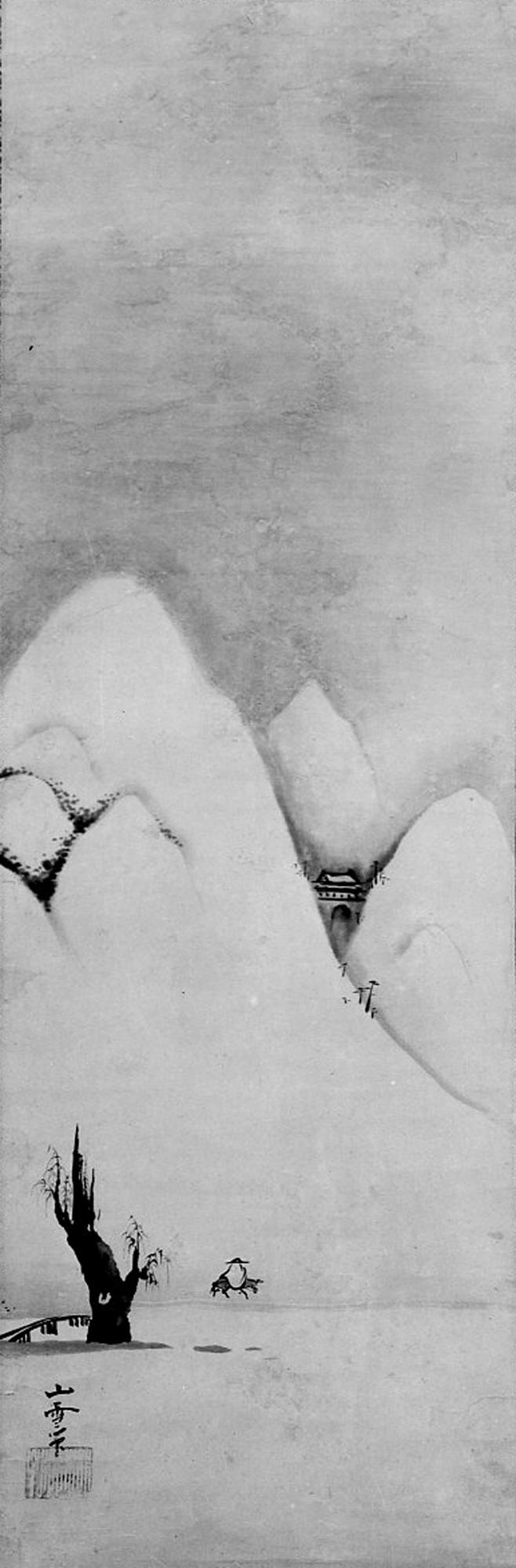
Winter Landscape. 1615–1651.

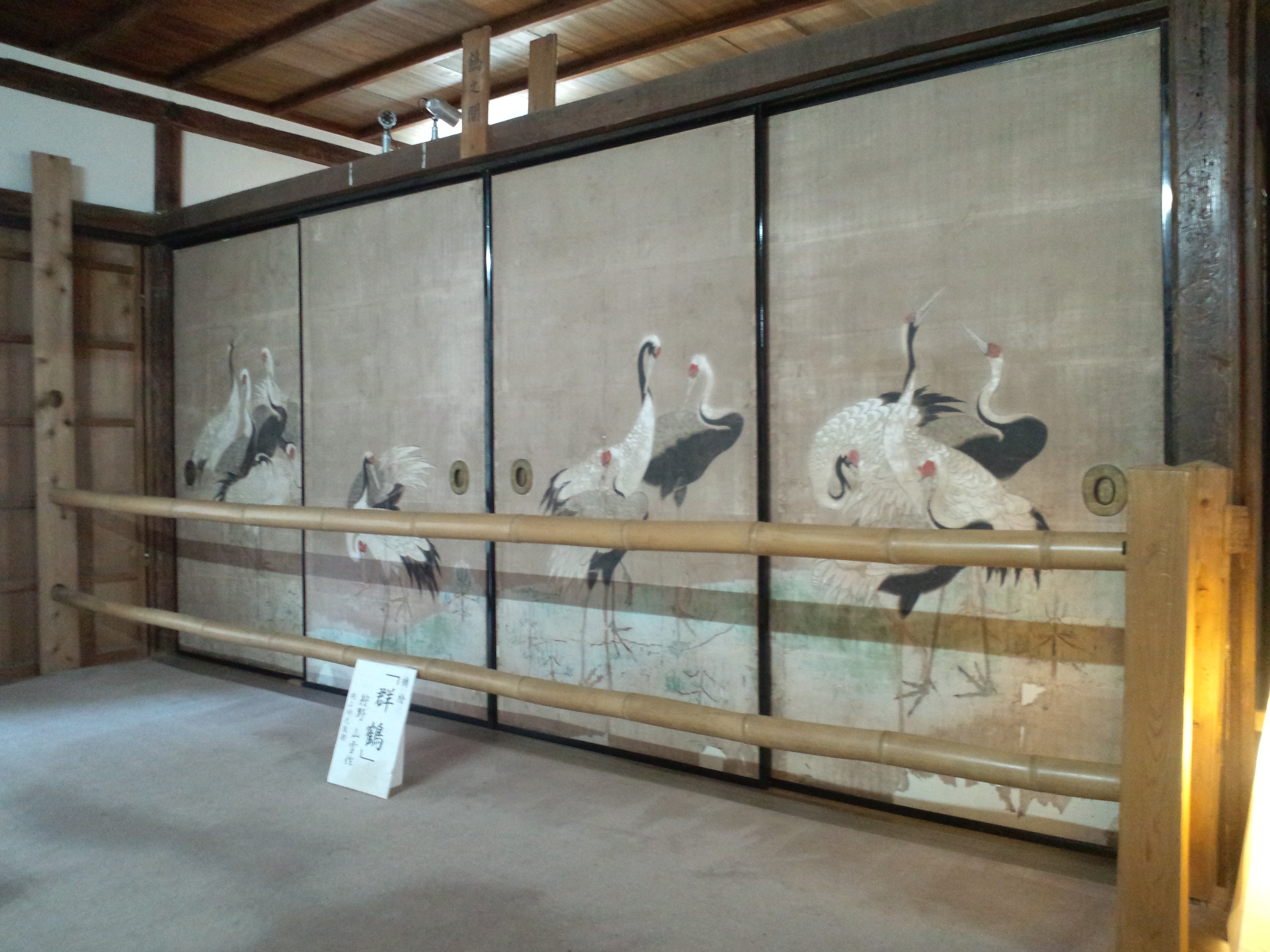
Cranes on sliding doors at Yoshimizu Shrine

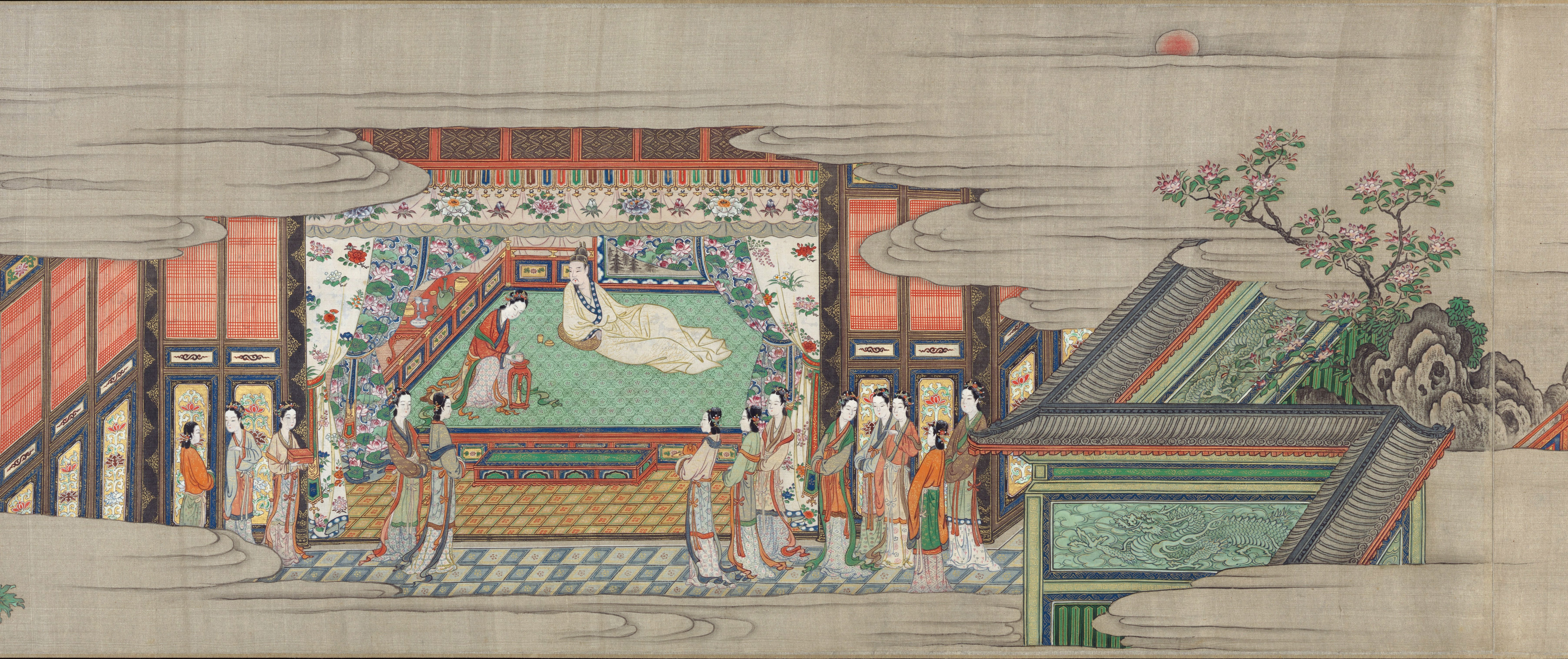
Scene from the poem Chang Hen Ge by Bai Juyi (772–846).

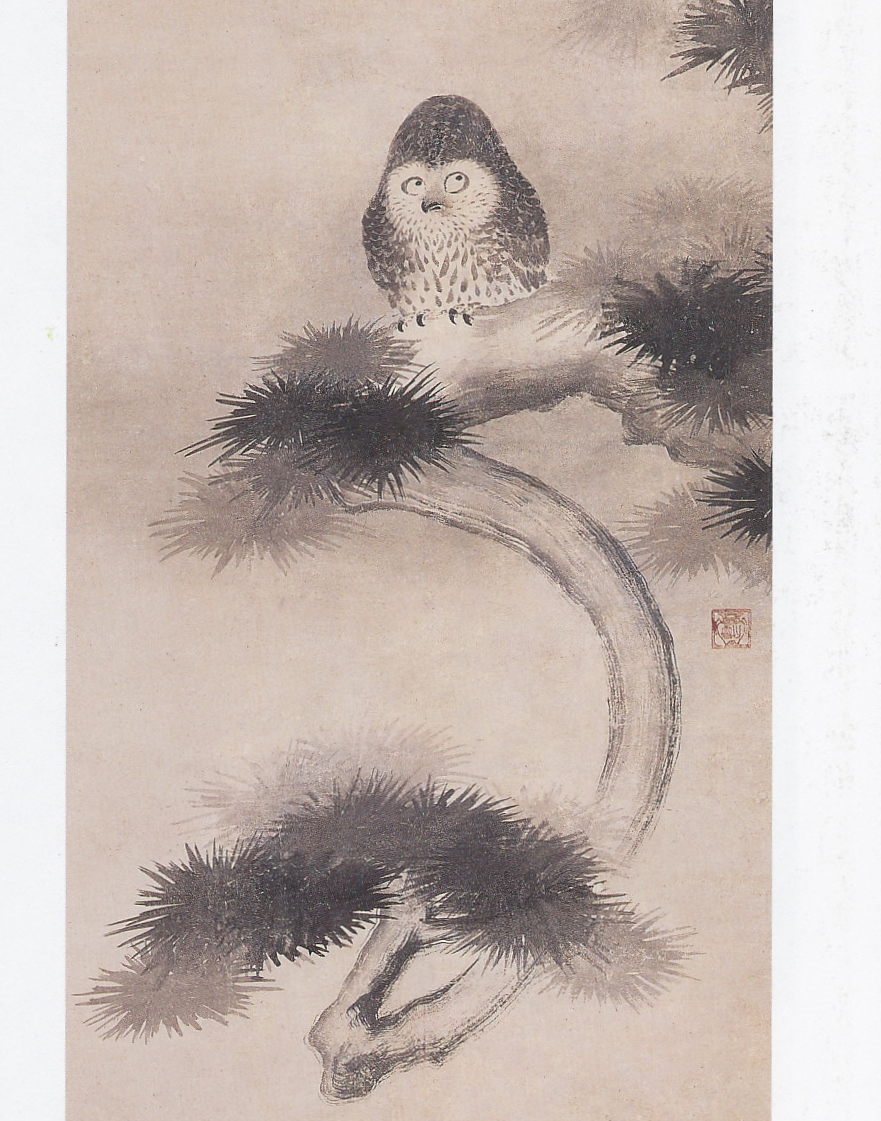
Owl on the Pine and Chicken on the Bamboo, owl section. Early 1600s.

Folding screens

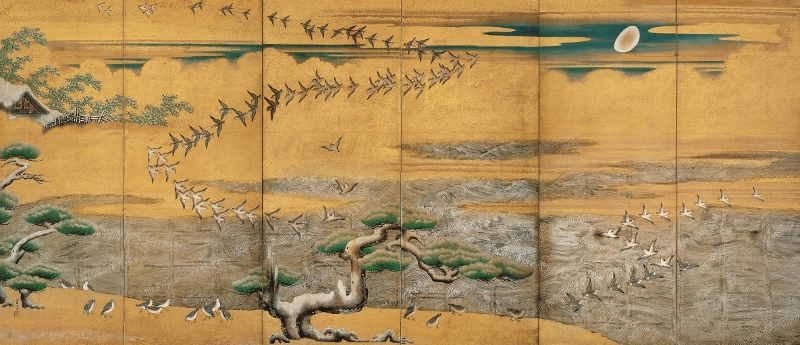
Waterfowl of the Winter Beach. Folding screen, left panel. 1629. Important Cultural Property

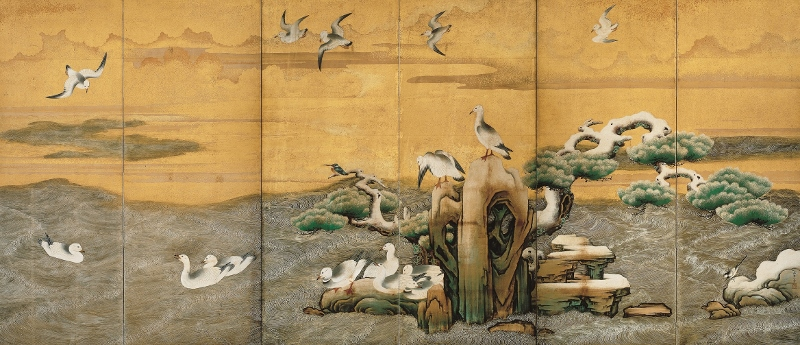
Waterfowl of the Winter Beach. Folding screen, right panel. 1629. Important Cultural Property

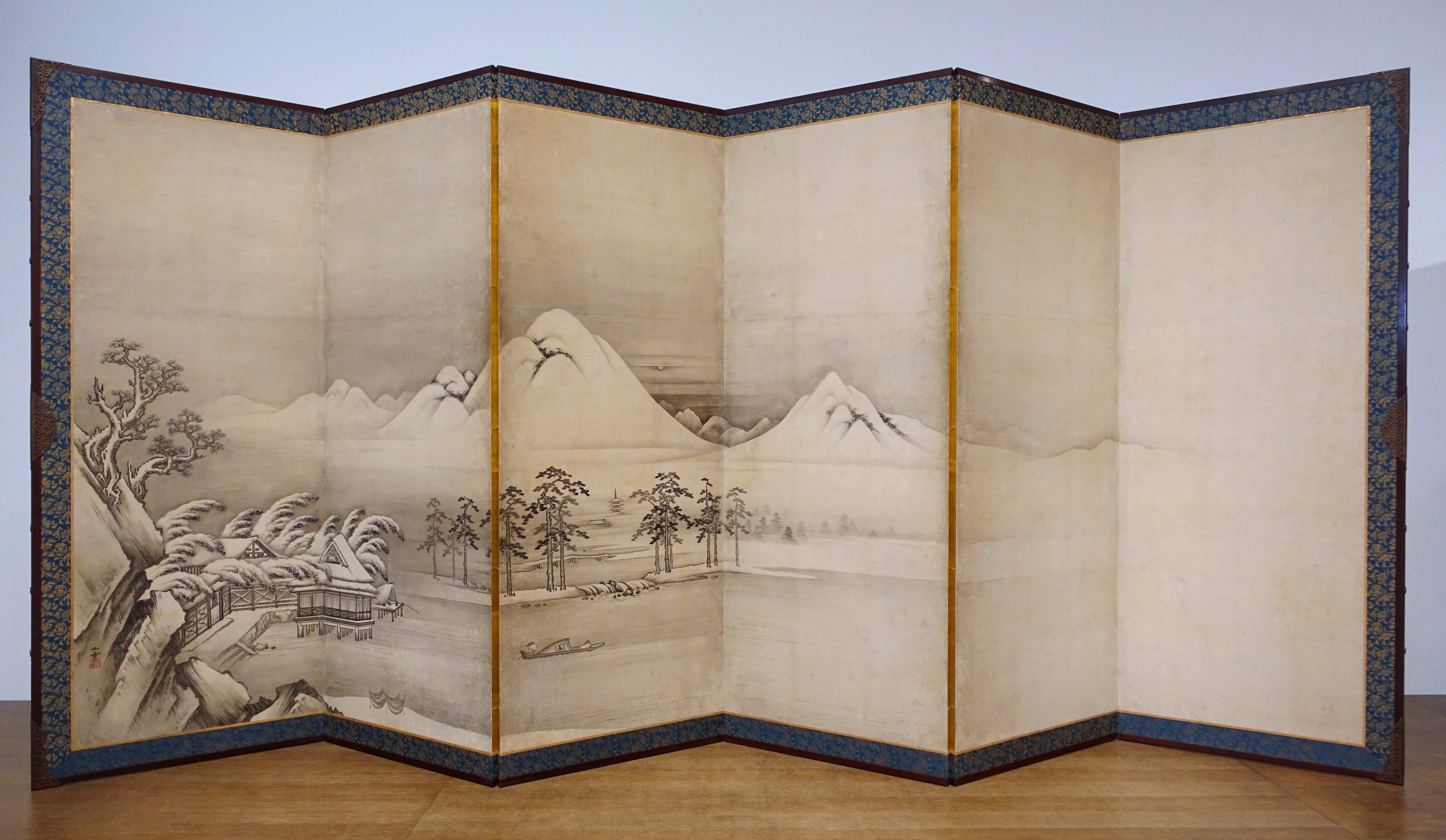
Wang Ziyou Visiting Dai Andao, ink painting on a folding screen. Mid 1600s.

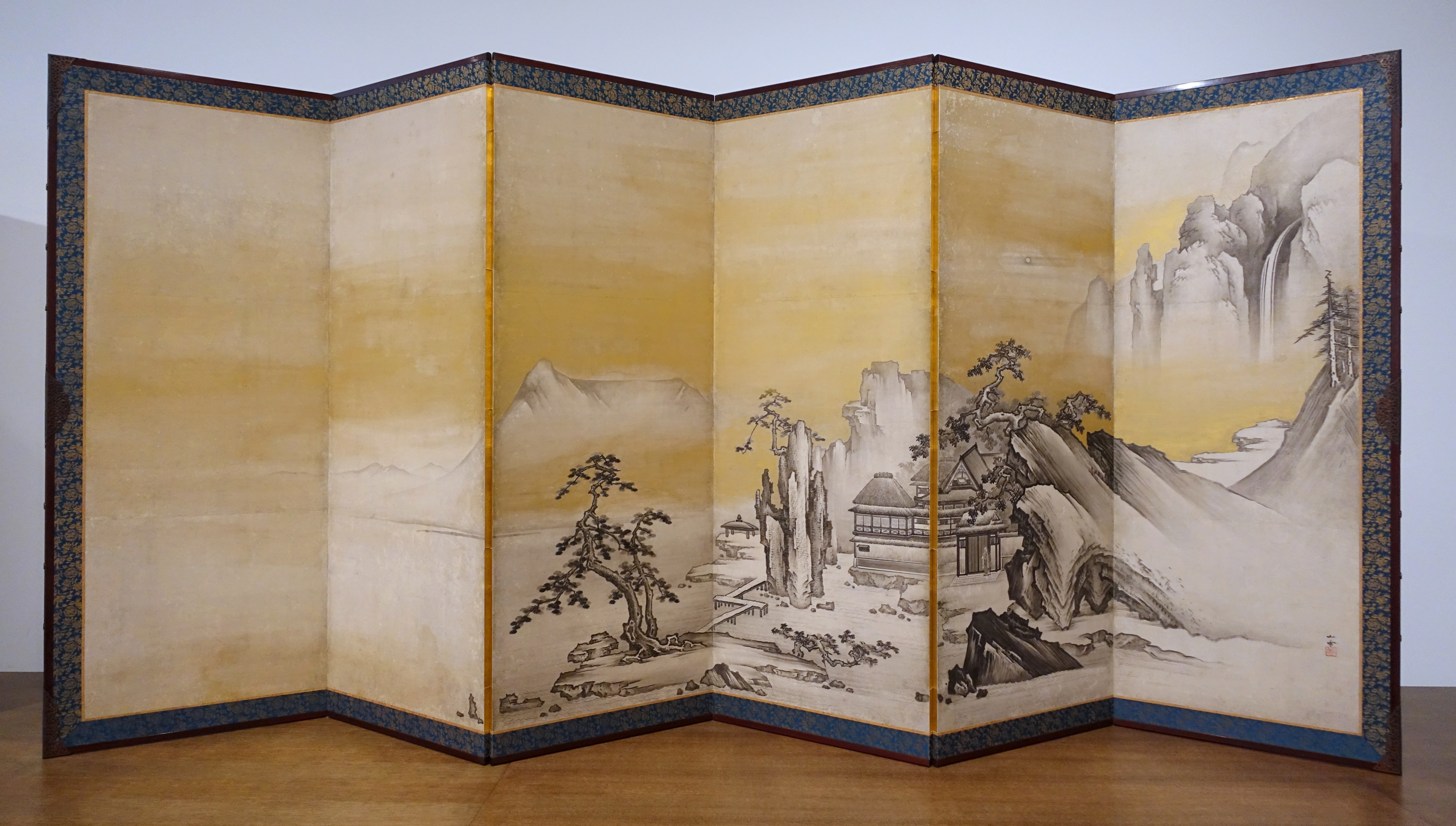
A Monk Claps His Hands, ink painting on a folding screen. Mid 1600s.

Chinese figure portraits

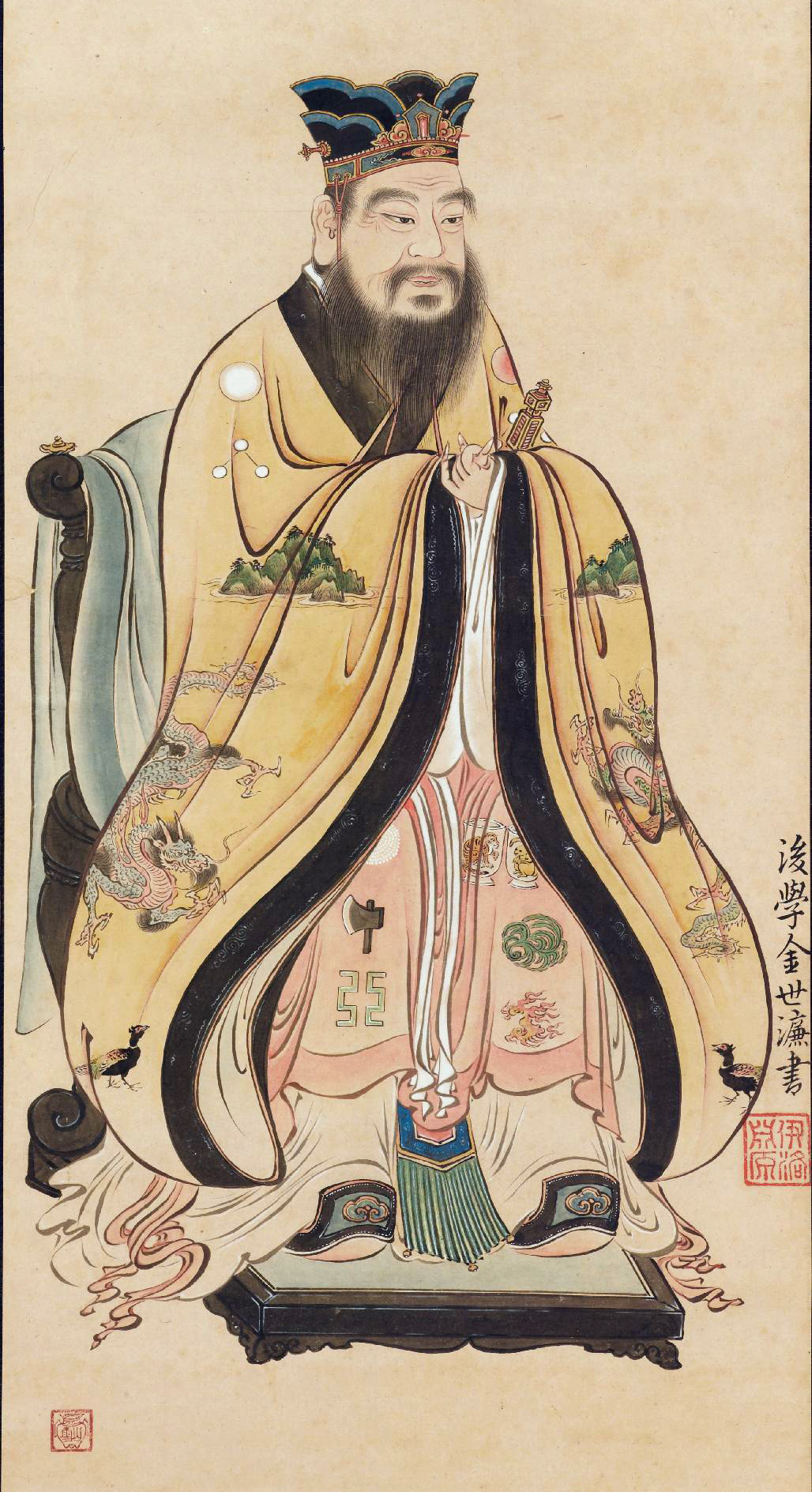
Kongzi. 1632.

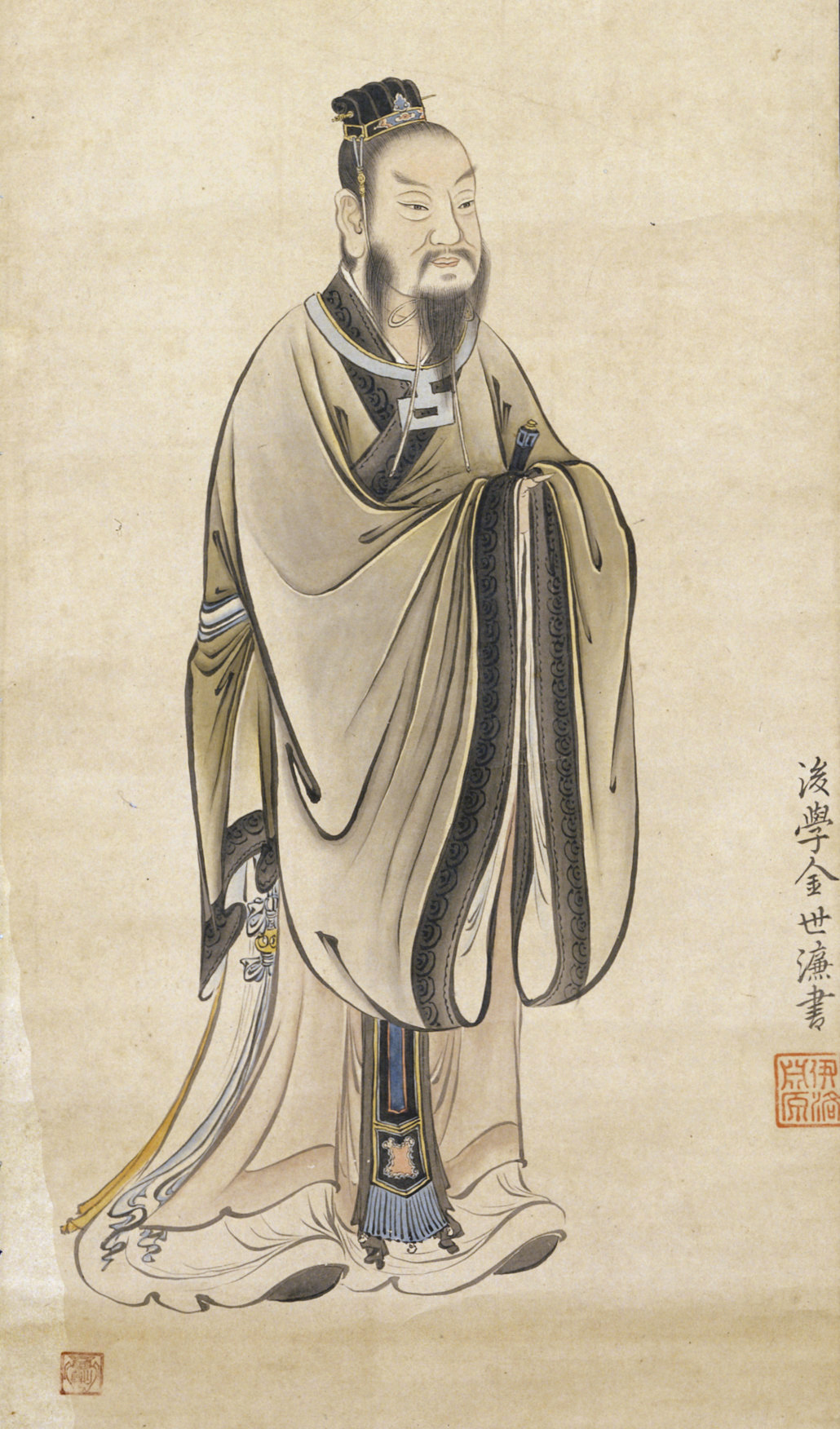
Mengzi. 1632.

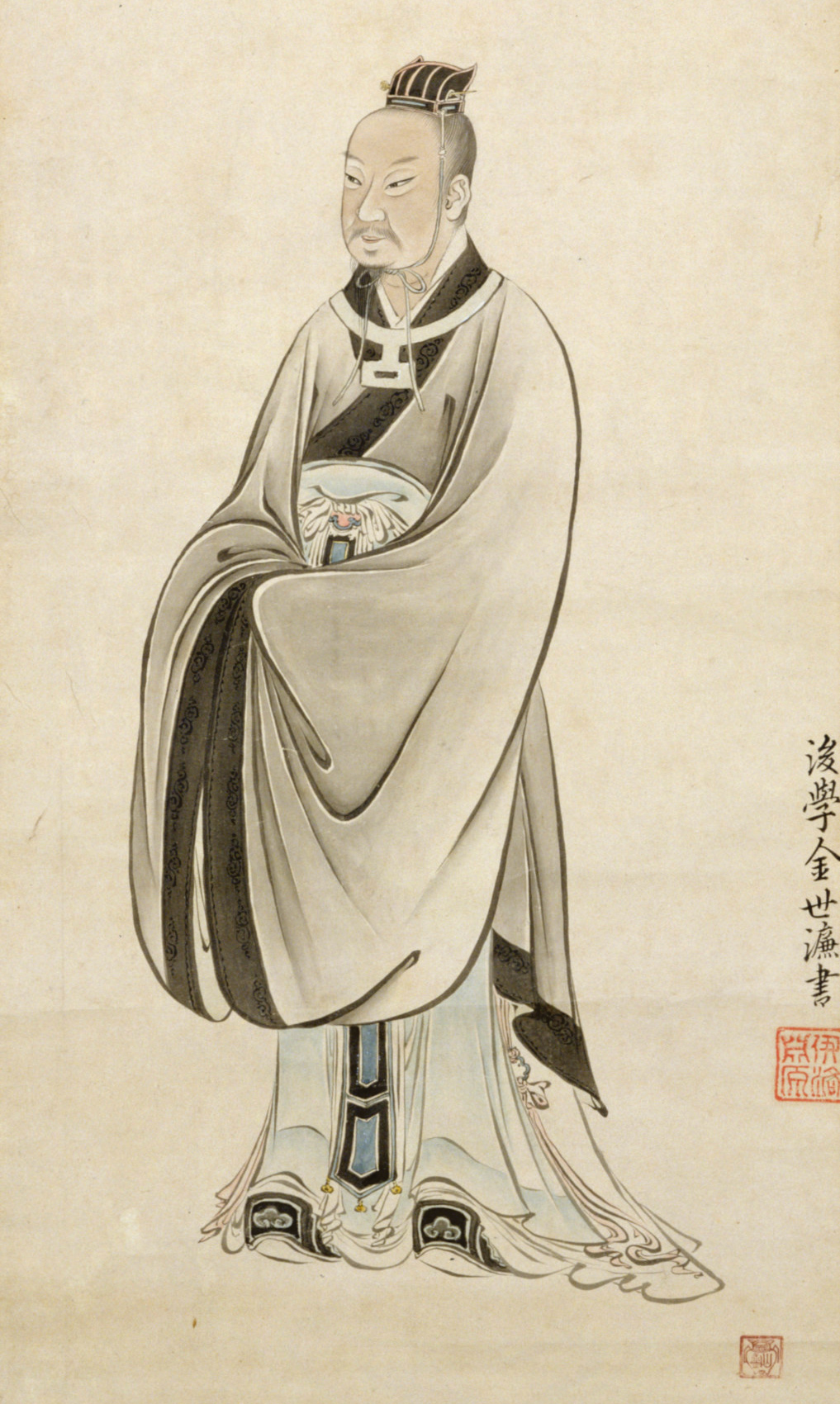
Yanzi. 1632.

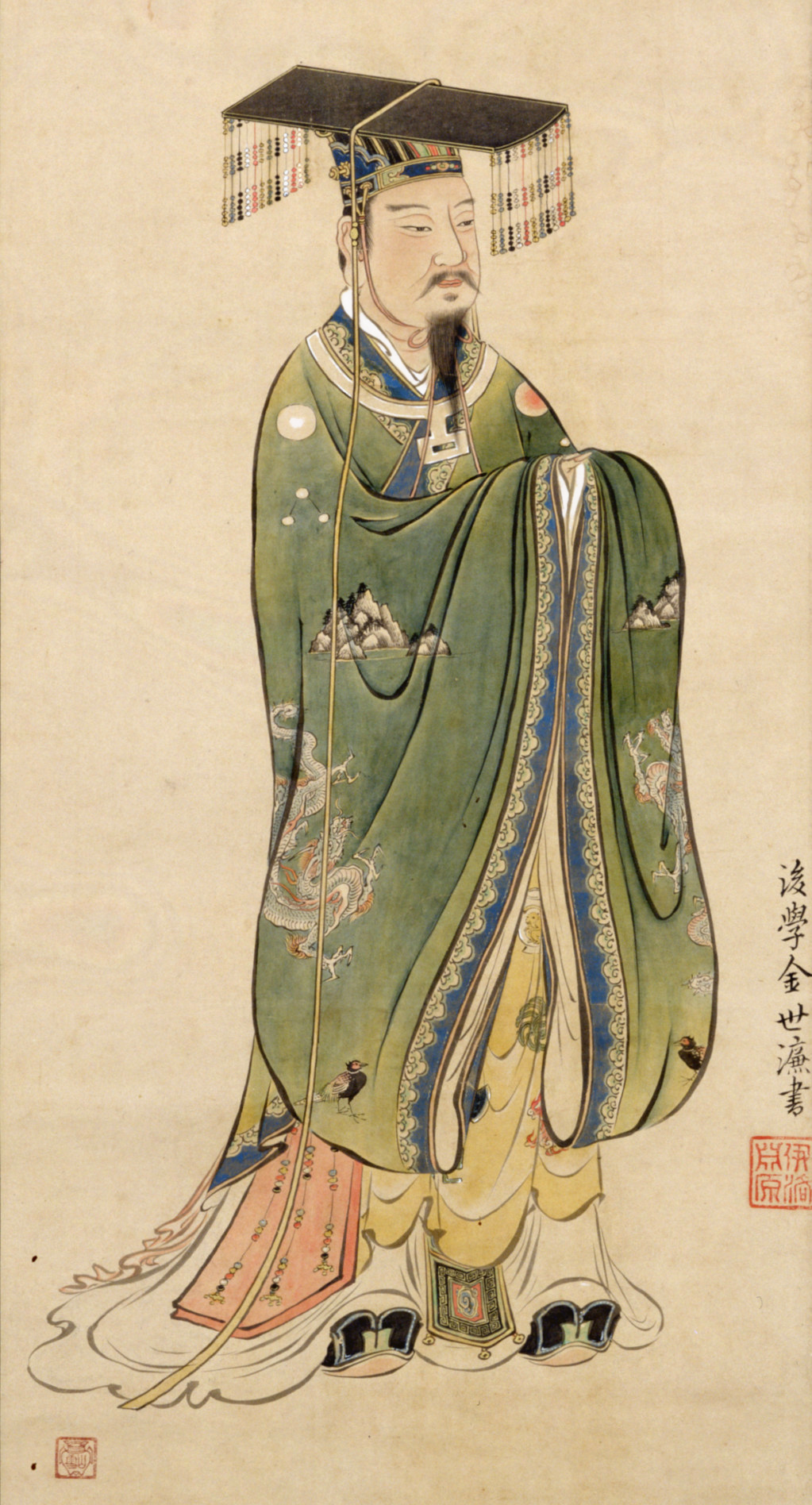
Emperor Yao. 1632.

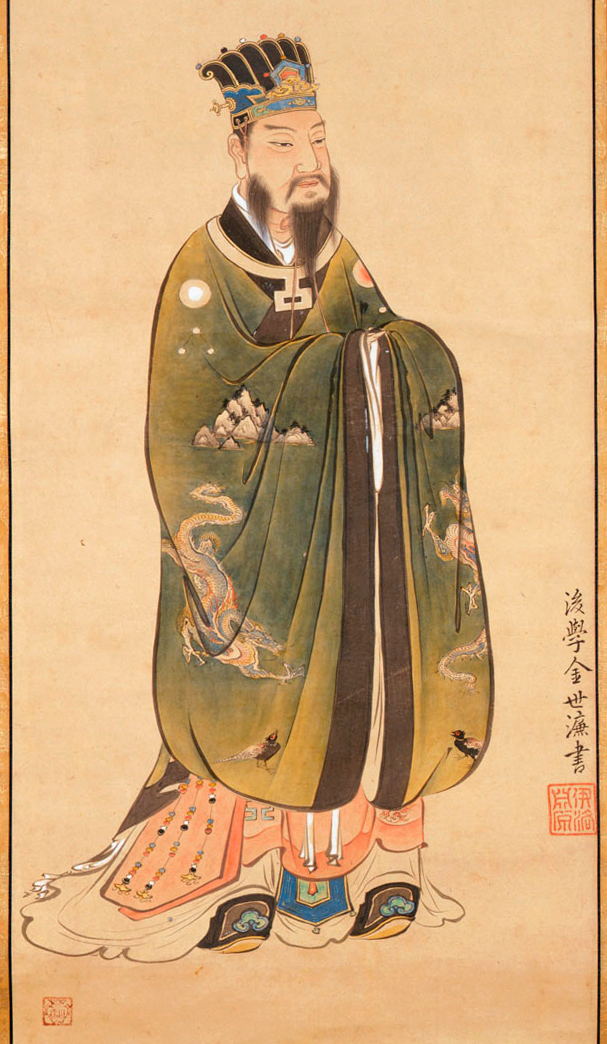
King Wen of Zhou. 1632.

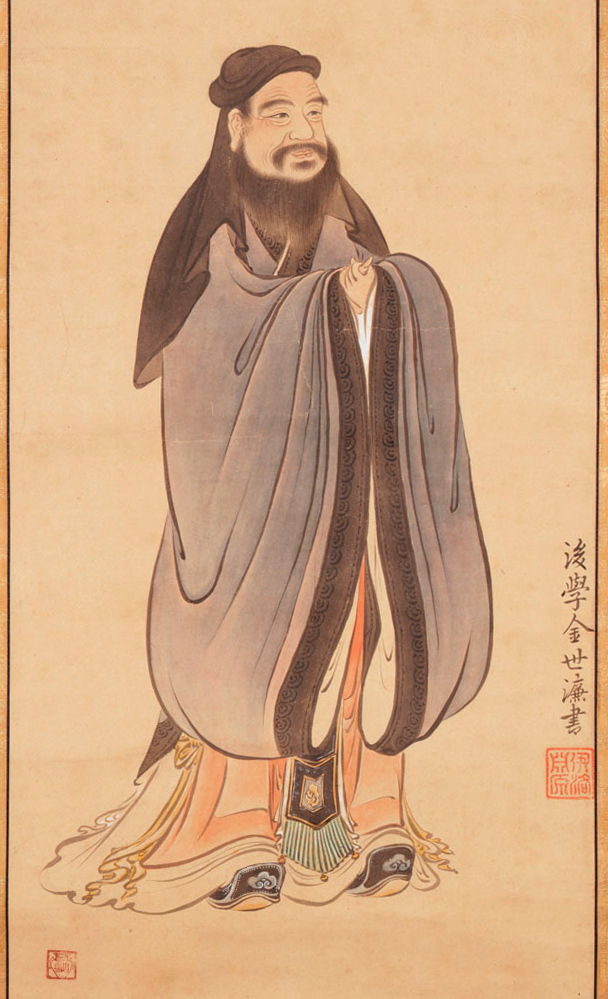
The Duke of Zhou. 1632.
