= List of cultural properties of Japan – paintings (Tokyo) =

This list is of the cultural properties of Japan designated in the category of paintings (絵画, kaiga) for the Metropolis of Tōkyō.

== National Cultural Properties ==
As of 1 February 2016, six hundred and fourteen Important Cultural Properties have been designated (including sixty-three *National Treasures), being of national significance.

Property	Date	Municipality	Ownership	Comments	Image	Dimensions	Coordinates	Ref.
*Illustrated Biography of Shōtoku Taishi, colour on silk, by Hata no Chitei 綾本著色聖徳太子絵伝（絵殿旧障子絵）〈秦致真筆／（法隆寺献納）〉 ryōhon chakushoku Shōtoku Taishi eden (Edono kyū-shōji-e Hata no Chitei hitsu Hōryūji kennō)	1069	Taitō	Tokyo National Museum	ten panels; originally mounted on sliding doors at Hōryū-ji		189.2 centimetres (74.5 in) to 190.5 centimetres (75.0 in) by 137.2 centimetres (54.0 in) to 148.2 centimetres (58.3 in)	35°43′12″N 139°46′32″E	
*Portrait of Takami Senseki, light colour on silk, by Watanabe Kazan 絹本淡彩鷹見泉石像〈渡辺崋山筆／〉 kenpon tansai Takami Senseki zō (Watanabe Kazan hitsu)	1837	Taitō	Tokyo National Museum			115.1 centimetres (45.3 in) by 57.1 centimetres (22.5 in)	35°43′12″N 139°46′32″E	
*Illustrated Biography of Ippen Shōnin, colour on silk, by En'i 絹本著色一遍上人絵伝〈法眼円伊筆／巻第七〉 kenpon chakushoku Ippen Shōnin eden (Hōgen En'i hitsu maki dai-nana)	1299	Taitō	Tokyo National Museum			37.8 centimetres (14.9 in) by 802.0 centimetres (315.7 in)	35°43′12″N 139°46′32″E	
*Kokūzō Bosatsu, colour on silk 絹本著色虚空蔵菩薩像 kenpon chakushoku Kokūzō bosatsu zō	Heian period	Taitō	Tokyo National Museum			132.0 centimetres (52.0 in) by 84.4 centimetres (33.2 in)	35°43′12″N 139°46′32″E	
*Kujaku Myōō, colour on silk 絹本著色孔雀明王像 kenpon chakushoku Kujaku Myōō zō	Heian period	Taitō	Tokyo National Museum			147.9 centimetres (58.2 in) by 98.9 centimetres (38.9 in)	35°43′12″N 139°46′32″E	
*Red and White Cotton Roses, colour on silk 絹本著色紅白芙蓉図 kenpon chakushoku kōhaku fuyō zu	Southern Song	Taitō	Tokyo National Museum	by Li Di		25.2 centimetres (9.9 in) by 25.5 centimetres (10.0 in)	35°43′12″N 139°46′32″E	
*Sixteen Arhats, colour on silk 絹本著色十六羅漢像 kenpon chakushoku jūroku rakan zu	Heian period	Taitō	Tokyo National Museum	sixteen scrolls		95.9 centimetres (37.8 in) to 97.2 centimetres (38.3 in) by 51.8 centimetres (20.4 in) to 52.2 centimetres (20.6 in)	35°43′12″N 139°46′32″E	
*Senju Kannon, colour on silk 絹本著色千手観音像 kenpon chakushoku Senju Kannon zō	Heian period	Taitō	Tokyo National Museum			138.0 centimetres (54.3 in) by 69.4 centimetres (27.3 in)	35°43′12″N 139°46′32″E	
*Pigeon on a Peach Branch, colour on silk 絹本著色桃鳩図〈徽宗筆／大観元年の年記がある〉 kenpon chakushoku momo hato zu (Kisō hitsu Daikan gannen no toshi-ki ga aru)	1107	Tokyo	private	by Emperor Huizong of Song; dated by its inscription to Daguan 1		28.5 centimetres (11.2 in) by 16.1 centimetres (6.3 in)		
*Detached Segment from The Deeds of the Zen Masters, ink on paper 紙本墨画禅機図断簡〈因陀羅筆／（丹霞焼仏図）〉 shihon bokuga zenkizu dankan (Indara hitsu Tanka shōbutsuzu)	Yuan dynasty	Machida	Ishibashi Foundation (kept at the Ishibashi Foundation Art Research Center (石橋財団アートリサーチセンター))	depicts Tanka burning Buddhist statues; by Indara (Yintuoluo)		35.0 centimetres (13.8 in) by 36.8 centimetres (14.5 in)	35°36′01″N 139°22′55″E	
Portrait of Eroshenko, oil on canvas, by Nakamura Tsune エロシェンコ像〈中村 彜筆 一九二〇年／油絵 麻布〉 Eroshenko zō (Nakamura Tsune hitsu 1920-nen abura-e mafu)	1920	Chiyoda	National Museum of Modern Art, Tokyo			42.0 centimetres (16.5 in) by 45.5 centimetres (17.9 in)	35°41′26″N 139°45′17″E	
Oiran, oil on canvas, by Takahashi Yuichi 花魁〈高橋由一筆／油絵 麻布〉 oiran (Takahashi Yuichi hitsu abura-e mafu)	1872	Taitō	The University Art Museum, Tokyo University of the Arts			77.0 centimetres (30.3 in) by 54.8 centimetres (21.6 in)	35°43′10″N 139°46′18″E	
Kannon Riding a Dragon, oil on canvas, by Harada Naojirō 騎竜観音〈原田直次郎筆 一八九〇年／油絵 麻布〉 kiryū Kannon (Harada Naojirō hitsu 1890-nen abura-e mafu)	1890	Chiyoda	Gokoku-ji (kept at the National Museum of Modern Art, Tokyo)	materials and techniques of western oil painting applied to the Japanese subject of a white-robed Kannon, holding a willow branch in one hand and a water jar in the other		272.0 centimetres (107.1 in) by 181.0 centimetres (71.3 in)	35°41′26″N 139°45′17″E	
Shoemaker, oil on canvas, by Harada Naojirō 靴屋の親爺〈原田直次郎筆 一八八六年／油絵 麻布〉 kutsuya no oyaji (Harada Naojirō hitsu 1886-nen abura-e mafu)	1886	Taitō	The University Art Museum, Tokyo University of the Arts			60.3 centimetres (23.7 in) by 46.5 centimetres (18.3 in)	35°43′10″N 139°46′18″E	
Yoroboshi, colour on silk with gold ground, byōbu by Shimomura Kanzan 絹本金地著色弱法師図〈下村観山筆／六曲屏風〉 kenpon kinji chakushoku Yoroboshi zu (Shimomura Kanzan hitsu rokkyoku byōbu)	1915	Taitō	Tokyo National Museum	pair of six-fold screens; inspired by the Noh play of the same name		186.4 centimetres (73.4 in) by 406.0 centimetres (159.8 in)	35°43′12″N 139°46′32″E	
Solitary Angler on the Wintery River, light colour on silk, attributed to Ma Yuan 絹本淡彩寒江独釣図〈（伝馬遠筆）／〉 kenpon tansai kankō dokuchō zu (den-Baen hitsu)	Southern Song	Taitō	Tokyo National Museum			26.7 centimetres (10.5 in) by 50.6 centimetres (19.9 in)	35°43′12″N 139°46′32″E	
Kannon, light colour on silk, by Ryōzen 絹本淡彩観音図〈良全筆／〉 kenpon tansai Kannon zu (Ryōzen hitsu)	Southern Song	Taitō	Tokyo National Museum			109.6 centimetres (43.1 in) by 44.1 centimetres (17.4 in)	35°43′12″N 139°46′32″E	
Landscape with Calligraphy, ink and light colour on silk, by Dong Qichang 絹本淡彩及墨画山水書画冊〈董其昌筆／〉 kenpon tansai oyobi bokuga sansui shoga satsu (Tō Kishō hitsu)	Ming dynasty	Taitō	Tokyo National Museum				35°43′12″N 139°46′32″E	
Eight Views of Miyajima, light colour on silk, by Nagasawa Rosetsu 絹本淡彩宮島八景図〈長沢芦雪筆／甲寅（寛政六年）の款記がある〉 kenpon tansai Miyajima hakkei zu (Nagasawa Rosetsu hitsu kinoetora (Kansei roku-nen) no yoshimi-ki ga aru)	1794	Taitō	Agency for Cultural Affairs (kept at Tokyo National Museum)	one volume			35°43′08″N 139°46′36″E	
Landscape, light colour on silk, by Li Zai 絹本淡彩山水図〈李在筆／〉 kenpon tansai sansui zu (Ri Zai hitsu)	Ming dynasty	Taitō	Tokyo National Museum			138.8 centimetres (54.6 in) by 83.2 centimetres (32.8 in)	35°43′12″N 139°46′32″E	
Hermit in a Mountainous Area, ink and light colour on silk, by Uragami Gyokudō 絹本淡彩山中結廬図〈浦上玉堂筆／寛政四年の自賛がある〉 kenpon tansai sanchū ketsuro zu (Uragami Gyokudō hitsu Kansei shi-nen no jisan ga aru)	1792	Taitō	Tokyo National Museum			65.4 centimetres (25.7 in) by 32.1 centimetres (12.6 in)	35°43′12″N 139°46′32″E	
Landscapes of the Four Seasons, light colour on silk 絹本淡彩四季山水図 kenpon tansai shiki sansui zu	Muromachi period	Taitō	Tokyo National Museum	four scrolls			35°43′12″N 139°46′32″E	
Hen and Bamboo, light colour on silk, by Luo Chang 絹本淡彩竹鶏図〈蘿窓筆／自賛アリ〉 kenpon tansai chiku kei zu (Ra Sō hitsu jisan ari)	Southern Song	Taitō	Tokyo National Museum			96.3 centimetres (37.9 in) by 42.4 centimetres (16.7 in)	35°43′12″N 139°46′32″E	
Grapes, light colour on silk, by Tachihara Kyōsho 絹本淡彩葡萄図〈立原杏所筆／〉 kenpon tansai buzō zu (Tachihara Kyōsho hitsu)	1835	Taitō	Tokyo National Museum			89.7 centimetres (35.3 in) by 40.1 centimetres (15.8 in)	35°43′12″N 139°46′32″E	
Landscape, light colour on silk, by I Fukyū 絹本淡彩離合山水図〈伊孚九筆／自賛がある〉 kenpon tansai rigō sansui zu (I Fukyū hitsu jisan ga aru)	C18	Tokyo	private	three scrolls				
Landscape with Pavilion, light colour on silk, by Sun Junze 絹本淡彩楼閣山水図〈孫君沢筆／〉 kenpon tansai rōkaku sansui zu (Son Kuntaku hitsu)	Yuan Dynasty	Setagaya	Seikadō Bunko Art Museum	pair of scrolls			35°37′22″N 139°37′10″E	
Amida Nyorai, colour on silk 絹本著色阿弥陀如来像 kenpon chakushoku Amida Nyorai zō	1306	Minato	Nezu Museum	Goryeo Buddhist painting		162.5 centimetres (64.0 in) by 91.7 centimetres (36.1 in)	35°39′44″N 139°43′02″E	
Aizen Myōō, colour on silk 絹本著色愛染明王像 kenpon chakushoku Aizen Myōō zō	Kamakura period	Tokyo						
Aizen Myōō, colour on silk 絹本著色愛染明王像 kenpon chakushoku Aizen Myōō zō	Kamakura period	Taitō	Gokoku-in (護国院)				35°43′10″N 139°46′13″E	
Aizen Myōō, colour on silk 絹本著色愛染明王像 kenpon chakushoku Aizen Myōō zō	Kamakura period	Minato	Nezu Museum			123.8 centimetres (48.7 in) by 95.0 centimetres (37.4 in)	35°39′44″N 139°43′02″E	
Aizen Myōō, colour on silk 絹本著色愛染明王像 kenpon chakushoku Aizen Myōō zō	Kamakura period	Minato	Nezu Museum			82.3 centimetres (32.4 in) by 51.0 centimetres (20.1 in)	35°39′44″N 139°43′02″E	
Aizen Mandala, colour on silk 絹本著色愛染曼荼羅図 kenpon chakushoku Aizen mandara zu	Kamakura period	Minato	Nezu Museum			121.2 centimetres (47.7 in) by 90.9 centimetres (35.8 in)	35°39′44″N 139°43′02″E	
Portrait of San'yūtei Enchō, colour on silk, by Kaburagi Kiyokata 三遊亭円朝像（鏑木清方筆／絹本著色） San'yūtei Enchō zō (Kaburagi Kiyokata hitsu kenpon chakushoku)	1930	Chiyoda	National Museum of Modern Art, Tokyo			138.5 centimetres (54.5 in) by 76.0 centimetres (29.9 in)	35°41′26″N 139°45′17″E	
Camellia Petals Scattering, colour on paper with gold ground, byōbu by Hayami Gyoshū 紙本金地著色名樹散椿図〈速水御舟筆／二曲屏風〉 shihon kinji chakushoku meiju chiri tsubaki zu (Hayami Gyoshū hitsu ni-kyoku byōbu)	1929	Shibuya	Yamatane Museum	pair of two-panel screens		169.6 centimetres (66.8 in) by 167.9 centimetres (66.1 in)	35°39′12″N 139°42′49″E	
Jo-no-mai, colour on silk, by Uemura Shōen 序の舞〈上村松園筆／絹本著色〉 Jo-no-mai (Uemura Shōen hitsu kenpon chakushoku)	1936	Taitō	The University Art Museum, Tokyo University of the Arts			233.0 centimetres (91.7 in) by 141.3 centimetres (55.6 in)	35°43′10″N 139°46′18″E	
Hair, colour on silk, by Kobayashi Kokei 髪〈小林古径筆／絹本著色〉 kami (Kobayashi Kokei hitsu kenpon chakushoku)	1931	Bunkyō	Eisei Bunko Museum			173.5 centimetres (68.3 in) by 108.0 centimetres (42.5 in)	35°42′48″N 139°43′24″E	
Mother and Child]], colour on silk, by Uemura Shōen 母子〈上村松園筆/絹本著色〉 boshi (Uemura Shōen hitsu kenpon chakushoku)	1934	Chiyoda	National Museum of Modern Art, Tokyo			168.0 centimetres (66.1 in) by 115.5 centimetres (45.5 in)	35°41′26″N 139°45′17″E	
Camp at Kisegawa, colour on paper, byōbu by Yasuda Yukihiko 紙本著色黄瀬川陣〈安田靫彦筆/六曲屏風〉 shihon chakushoku Kisegawa-no-jin (Yasuda Yukihiko hitsu rokkyoku byōbu)	1940/1	Chiyoda	National Museum of Modern Art, Tokyo	pair of six-fold screens; the subject of Minamoto no Yoshitsune coming to join Minamoto no Yoritomo is based on the Azuma Kagami		167.7 centimetres (66.0 in) by 374.0 centimetres (147.2 in)	35°41′26″N 139°45′17″E	
Dancing in the Flames, colour on silk, by Hayami Gyoshū 絹本著色炎舞図〈速水御舟筆／〉 kenpon chakushoku enbu zu (Hayami Gyoshū hitsu)	1925	Shibuya	Yamatane Museum			120.3 centimetres (47.4 in) by 53.8 centimetres (21.2 in)	35°39′12″N 139°42′49″E	
Serving Girl in a Spa, colour on silk, byōbu by Tsuchida Bakusen 絹本著色湯女図〈土田麦僊筆／二曲屏風〉 kenpon chakushoku yuna zu (Tsuchida Bakusen hitsu nikyoku byōbu)	1918	Chiyoda	National Museum of Modern Art, Tokyo	pair of two-fold screens		197.6 centimetres (77.8 in) by 195.5 centimetres (77.0 in)	35°41′26″N 139°45′17″E	
Kiyohime at the Hidaka River, colour on silk, by Murakami Kagaku 絹本著色日高河清姫図〈村上華岳筆／〉 kenpon chakushoku Hidaka-gawa Kiyohime zu (Murakami Kagaku hitsu)	1919	Chiyoda	National Museum of Modern Art, Tokyo			142.5 centimetres (56.1 in) by 55.7 centimetres (21.9 in)	35°41′26″N 139°45′17″E	
Tabby Cat, colour on silk, by Takeuchi Seihō 絹本著色斑猫図〈竹内栖鳳筆／〉 kenpon chakushoku hanbyō zu (Takeuchi Seihō hitsu)	1924	Shibuya	Yamatane Museum			81.9 centimetres (32.2 in) by 101.6 centimetres (40.0 in)	35°39′12″N 139°42′49″E	
Eight Famous Sights along the Xiao River and the Xiang River, colour on silk, by Yokoyama Taikan 絹本著色瀟湘八景図〈横山大観筆／〉 kenpon chakushoku shōshō hakkei zu (Yokoyama Taikan hitsu)	1912	Taitō	Tokyo National Museum	eight scrolls: Clouds and Sails off Distant Shore (遠浦雲帆), Night Rain over the Xiao and Xiang (瀟湘夜雨), Evening Bell from a Distant Temple (烟寺晩鐘), Mountain Village after Storm (山市晴嵐), Fishing Village in Sunset Glow (漁村返照), Autumn Moon Over Lake Dongting (洞庭秋月), Wild Geese Descending to Sandbar (平沙落雁), and River Sky in Evening Snow (江天暮雪); Natsume Sōseki observed that the paintings have "a charm that appears to be sophisticated and fatuous at the same time" (気の利いた様な間の抜けた様な趣)		113.6 centimetres (44.7 in) by 60.6 centimetres (23.9 in)	35°43′12″N 139°46′32″E	
Metempsychosis, ink on silk, by Yokoyama Taikan 絹本墨画生々流転図〈横山大観筆／〉 kenpon bokuga seisei ruten zu (Yokoyama Taikan hitsu)	1923	Chiyoda	National Museum of Modern Art, Tokyo	a drop of water from the vapours in the sky transforms into a mountain stream, which flows into a great river and on into the sea, whence rises a dragon (pictured) which again turns to vapour		55.3 centimetres (21.8 in) by 4,070.0 centimetres (1,602.4 in)	35°41′26″N 139°45′17″E	
Eight Famous Sights of Ōmi, colour on paper, by Imamura Shikō 紙本著色近江八景図〈今村紫紅筆／〉 shihon chakushoku Ōmi hakkei zu (Imamura Shikō hitsu)	1912	Taitō	Tokyo National Museum	eight scrolls; see Eight Views of Ōmi		165.0 centimetres (65.0 in) by 56.9 centimetres (22.4 in)	35°43′12″N 139°46′32″E	
Parting Spring, colour on paper, byōbu by Kawai Gyokudō 紙本著色行く春図〈川合玉堂筆／六曲屏風〉 shihon chakushoku yukuharu zu (Kawai Gyokudō hitsu rokkyoku byōbu)	1916	Chiyoda	National Museum of Modern Art, Tokyo	pair of six-fold screens		183.0 centimetres (72.0 in) by 390.0 centimetres (153.5 in)	35°41′26″N 139°45′17″E	
Sceneries in the Tropical Land, colour on paper, by Imamura Shikō 紙本著色熱国の巻〈今村紫紅筆／〉 shihon chakushoku nekkoku no maki (Imamura Shikō hitsu)	1914	Taitō	Tokyo National Museum	pair of scrolls, morning and evening		morning: 47.5 centimetres (18.7 in) by 954.5 centimetres (31 ft 3.8 in); evening: 45.7 centimetres (18.0 in) by 966.0 centimetres (31 ft 8.3 in)	35°43′12″N 139°46′32″E	
Road Cut Through a Hill, oil on canvas, by Kishida Ryūsei 切通しの写生〈岸田劉生筆 一九一五年／油絵 麻布〉 kiridōshi no shasei (Kishida Ryūsei hitsu 1915-nen abura-e mafu)	1915	Chiyoda	National Museum of Modern Art, Tokyo			56.0 centimetres (22.0 in) by 53.0 centimetres (20.9 in)	35°41′26″N 139°45′17″E	
Nude, colour on silk, by Murakami Kagaku 裸婦図〈村上華岳筆／絹本著色〉 rafu zu (Murakami Kagaku hitsu kenpon chakushoku)	1920	Shibuya	Yamatane Museum			163.6 centimetres (64.4 in) by 109.1 centimetres (43.0 in)	35°39′12″N 139°42′49″E	
Portrait of Reiko, oil on canvas, by Kishida Ryūsei 麗子微笑〈岸田劉生筆 一九二一年／油絵 麻布〉 Reiko bishō (Kishida Ryūsei hitsu 1921-nen aburae mafu)	1921	Taitō	Tokyo National Museum			44.2 centimetres (17.4 in) by 36.4 centimetres (14.3 in)	35°43′12″N 139°46′32″E	
Bodhisattva Kenshu, colour on silk, by Hishida Shunsō 絹本著色賢首菩薩図〈菱田春草筆／〉 kenpon chakushoku Kenshu Bosatsu zō (Hishida Shunsō hitsu)	1907	Chiyoda	National Museum of Modern Art, Tokyo	Kenshu, also Genju or Fazang, third patriarch of the Kegon (Huayan) school, explains the Kegon Sutra (Flower Garland Sutra) to Empress Wu Zetian using the analogy of a golden lion		185.7 centimetres (73.1 in) by 99.5 centimetres (39.2 in)	35°41′26″N 139°45′17″E	
Black Cat, colour on silk, by Hishida Shunsō 絹本著色賢首菩薩図〈菱田春草筆／〉 kenpon chakushoku kuroki neko zu (Hishida Shunsō hitsu)	1910	Bunkyō	Eisei Bunko Museum				35°42′48″N 139°43′24″E	
Kannon as Compassionate Mother, colour on silk, by Kanō Hōgai 絹本著色悲母観音像〈狩野芳崖筆／〉 kenpon chakushoku hibo Kannon zō (Kanō Hōgai hitsu)	1888	Taitō	The University Art Museum, Tokyo University of the Arts			195.8 centimetres (77.1 in) by 86.1 centimetres (33.9 in)	35°43′10″N 139°46′18″E	
Dragon and Tiger, colour on silk, byōbu by Hashimoto Gahō 絹本著色竜虎図〈橋本雅邦筆／六曲屏風〉 kenpon chakushoku ryū-ko zu (Hashimoto Gahō hitsu rokkyoku byōbu)	1895	Setagaya	Seikadō Bunko Art Museum	pair of six-fold screens			35°37′22″N 139°37′10″E	
Lakeside, oil on canvas, by Kuroda Seiki 湖畔〈黒田清輝筆 一八九七年／油絵 麻布〉 kohan (Kuroda Seiki hitsu 1897-nen abura-e mafu)	1897	Taitō	Tokyo National Museum			69.0 centimetres (27.2 in) by 84.7 centimetres (33.3 in)	35°43′08″N 139°46′24″E	
Black Fan, oil on canvas, by Fujishima Takeji 黒扇〈藤島武二筆／油絵 麻布〉 kokusen (Fujishima Takeji hitsu abura-e mafu)	1908/9	Machida	Ishibashi Foundation (kept at the Ishibashi Foundation Art Research Center (石橋財団アートリサーチセンター))			42.4 centimetres (16.7 in) by 63.7 centimetres (25.1 in)	35°36′01″N 139°22′55″E	
Reminiscence of the Tempyō Era, oil on canvas, by Fujishima Takeji 天平の面影〈藤島武二筆／油絵麻布〉 Tenpyō no omokage (Fujishima Takeji hitsu aburae mafu)	1902	Machida	Ishibashi Foundation (kept at the Ishibashi Foundation Art Research Center (石橋財団アートリサーチセンター))	the artist observed a kugo in the Shōsōin and references the ancient subject of a beauty under a tree		197.5 centimetres (6 ft 5.8 in) by 94.0 centimetres (3 ft 1.0 in)	35°36′01″N 139°22′55″E	
Paradise under the Sea, oil on canvas, by Aoki Shigeru わだつみのいろこの宮〈青木繁筆／油絵麻布一九〇七年〉 Wadatsumi no iroko no miya (Aoki Shigeru hitsu aburae mafu)	1907	Machida	Ishibashi Foundation (kept at the Ishibashi Foundation Art Research Center (石橋財団アートリサーチセンター))	on the subject of Umisachihiko and Yamasachihiko from the Kojiki		180.0 centimetres (5 ft 10.9 in) by 68.3 centimetres (2 ft 2.9 in)	35°36′01″N 139°22′55″E	
A Gift of the Sea, oil on canvas, by Aoki Shigeru 海の幸〈青木繁筆／油絵麻布〉 Umi no kō (Aoki Shigeru hitsu aburae mafu)	1904	Machida	Ishibashi Foundation (kept at the Ishibashi Foundation Art Research Center (石橋財団アートリサーチセンター))			70.2 centimetres (2 ft 3.6 in) by 182.0 centimetres (5 ft 11.7 in)	35°36′01″N 139°22′55″E	
Landscapes of the Four Seasons, light colour on silk, attributed to Sesshū Tōyō 絹本淡彩四季山水図〈（伝雪舟筆）／〉 kenpon tansai shiki sansui zu (den-Sesshū Tōyō hitsu)	C15	Machida	Ishibashi Foundation (kept at the Ishibashi Foundation Art Research Center (石橋財団アートリサーチセンター))			70.6 centimetres (27.8 in) by 44.2 centimetres (17.4 in)	35°36′01″N 139°22′55″E	
Salmon, oil on paper, by Takahashi Yuichi 鮭〈高橋由一筆／油絵 紙〉 sake (Takahashi Yuichi hitsu abura-e kami)	c.1877	Taitō	The University Art Museum, Tokyo University of the Arts			140.0 centimetres (55.1 in) by 46.5 centimetres (18.3 in)	35°43′10″N 139°46′18″E	
White Clouds and Autumn Leaves, colour on paper, by Hashimoto Gahō 紙本著色白雲紅樹図〈橋本雅邦筆／〉 shihon chakushoku hakuun kōju zu (Hashimoto Gahō hitsu)	1890	Taitō	The University Art Museum, Tokyo University of the Arts			265.8 centimetres (104.6 in) by 159.3 centimetres (62.7 in)	35°43′10″N 139°46′18″E	
Fudō Myōō, colour on paper, by Kanō Hōgai 紙本著色不動明王図〈狩野芳崖筆／〉 shihon chakushoku Fudō Myōō zu (Kanō Hōgai hitsu)	1887	Taitō	The University Art Museum, Tokyo University of the Arts			158.0 centimetres (62.2 in) by 78.8 centimetres (31.0 in)	35°43′10″N 139°46′18″E	
Fallen Leaves, colour on paper, byōbu by Hishida Shunsō 紙本著色落葉図〈菱田春草筆／六曲屏風〉 shihon chakushoku rakuyō zu (Hishida Shunsō hitsu rokkyoku byōbu)	1909	Bunkyō	Eisei Bunko Museum	pair of six-fold screens			35°42′48″N 139°43′24″E	
Harvest, oil on canvas, by Asai Chū 収穫〈浅井忠筆 一八九〇年／油絵 麻布〉 shūkaku (Asai Chū hitsu 1890-nen abura-e mafu)	1890	Taitō	The University Art Museum, Tokyo University of the Arts			69.6 centimetres (27.4 in) by 98.2 centimetres (38.7 in)	35°43′10″N 139°46′18″E	
Spring Ridge, oil on canvas, by Asai Chū 春畝〈浅井 忠筆 一八八八年／油絵 麻布〉 shunpo (Asai Chū hitsu 1888-nen abura-e mafu)	1888	Taitō	Tokyo National Museum			84.0 centimetres (33.1 in) by 102.5 centimetres (40.4 in)	35°43′12″N 139°46′32″E	
Wisdom Impression Sentiment, oil on canvas, by Kuroda Seiki 智・感・情〈黒田清輝筆 一八九九年／油絵 麻布〉 chi-kan-jō (Kuroda Seiki hitsu 1899-nen abura-e mafu)	1899	Taitō	Tokyo National Museum			180.6 centimetres (71.1 in) by 99.8 centimetres (39.3 in)	35°43′08″N 139°46′24″E	
Maiko, oil on canvas, by Kuroda Seiki 舞妓〈黒田清輝筆／油絵 麻布〉 maiko (Kuroda Seiki hitsu abura-e mafu)	1893	Taitō	Tokyo National Museum			80.4 centimetres (31.7 in) by 65.3 centimetres (25.7 in)	35°43′12″N 139°46′32″E	
Nude Beauty, oil on canvas, by Yorozu Tetsugorō 裸体美人〈萬鐵五郎筆／油絵 麻布〉 ratai bijin (Yorozu Tetsugorō hitsu abura-e mafu)	1912	Chiyoda	National Museum of Modern Art, Tokyo			162.0 centimetres (63.8 in) by 97.0 centimetres (38.2 in)	35°41′26″N 139°45′17″E	
Summer Landscape, ink on silk, by Chen Shaoying 絹本墨画夏景山水図〈陳紹英筆／順治十年九月の年記がある〉 kenpon bokuga kakei sansui zu (Chen Shaoying hitsu Junchi jū-nen ku-gatsu no nenki ga aru)	1653	Setagaya	Seikadō Bunko Art Museum	dated by an inscription to the tenth year of the Shunzhi Emperor			35°37′22″N 139°37′10″E	
Excellent Ox, light colour on paper 紙本淡彩駿牛図断簡 shihon tansai sungyū zu dankan	Kamakura period	Taitō	Tokyo National Museum			27.2 centimetres (10.7 in) by 32.4 centimetres (12.8 in)	35°43′12″N 139°46′32″E	
Excellent Ox, light colour on paper 紙本淡彩駿牛図断簡 shihon tansai sungyū zu dankan	Kamakura period	Taitō	Agency for Cultural Affairs (kept at Tokyo National Museum)				35°43′08″N 139°46′36″E	
Excellent Ox, light colour on paper 紙本淡彩駿牛図断簡 shihon tansai shungyū zu dankan	Kamakura period	Setagaya	Gotoh Museum			31.5 centimetres (12.4 in) by 32.4 centimetres (12.8 in)	35°36′44″N 139°38′08″E	

== Prefectural Cultural Properties ==
As of 10 February 2016, twenty-four properties have been designated at a metropolitan level.

Property	Date	Municipality	Ownership	Comments	Image	Dimensions	Coordinates	Ref.
Yakusha-e, colour on wooden boards, by Torii Kiyonaga 板絵着色役者絵 鳥居清長筆 ita-e chakushoku yakusha-e Torii Kiyonaga hitsu	Edo period	Nerima	Chōmei-ji (長命寺)			121 centimetres (48 in) by 136 centimetres (54 in)	35°44′38″N 139°36′52″E	
Nichiren Shōnin, oil on canvas 麻布油絵日蓮聖人像 mafu abura-e Nichiren Shōnin zō	1876	Suginami	Myōhō-ji (妙法寺)	by Takahashi Yuichi		54.4 centimetres (21.4 in) by 63.2 centimetres (24.9 in)	35°41′33″N 139°39′07″E	

== See also ==
- Cultural Properties of Japan
- List of National Treasures of Japan (paintings)
- Japanese painting
