= Metempsychosis (Yokoyama Taikan) =

1923 painting by Yokoyama Taikan

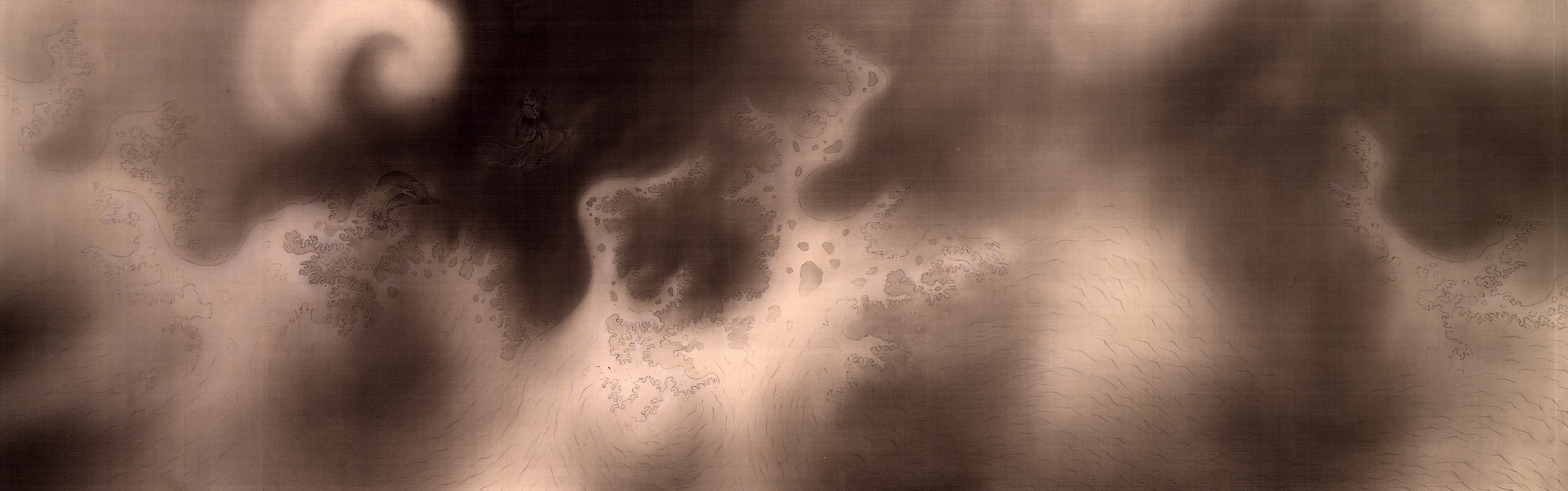
Detail of Metempsychosis (1923) by Yokoyama Taikan; a dragon rises from the surging waves of the ocean

Metempsychosis (生々流転, Seisei ruten), alternatively translated as The Wheel of Life, is a painting by Japanese Nihonga artist Yokoyama Taikan. First displayed at the tenth Inten exhibition in 1923, it forms part of the collection of the National Museum of Modern Art, Tokyo, and has been designated an Important Cultural Property.

== Description ==
In his choice of title, Yokoyama Taikan returned to the same Buddhist-infused conceptual world as drawn on for his earlier Selflessness (無我, Muga). His vision of nature sees transience and cyclical rebirth represented by the flow of water.

In the mountain haze, amid the pines (traditional symbol of longevity), blossoming cherries (symbol of transient beauty), and sporting deer (beings that mediate between the secular and the spiritual), a drop of moisture on a leaf grows into a mountain stream. The burgeoning, life-supporting river flows past communities of monkeys and of men, past obstacle-spanning bridges, down to the sea, where a pair of cormorants direct the viewer's gaze to the sky and the tornado or "whirling dragon" (竜巻, tatsu-maki) that rises from the surging waves, before turning again to mist. Along the way the long landscape scroll is populated by human figures – woodcutters, travellers, and fishermen – and suggestions of the divine, a stone lantern and a torii.

In the scroll, Yokoyama Taikan reworked the ink paintings of Sesshū and Sesson while drawing also on the traditions of Yamato-e. His varied shading includes the one-sided katabokashi (片ぼかし) technique and effects akin to Western chiaroscuro; a few years later, during his 1930 visit to Italy, he would be struck by Leonardo's use of sfumato. Yet despite the artist's innovations, the traditional clothing worn by the figures that people the scroll and their pre-industrial trades "may suggest that the changes in society brought about by contact with the West are only superficial to the fundamental continuities rooting modern Japan to its traditional past".

At the end of the scroll is the inscription "Taishō Water Pig (1923), eighth month, by Taikan" (大正癸亥八月大観作), along with the artist's Shōkodō (鉦鼓洞) seal.

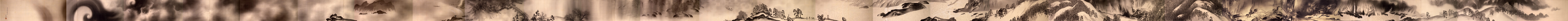
Metempsychosis (1923), by Yokoyama Taikan; ink on silk; 55.3 by 4,070 cm (1 ft 9.8 in by 133 ft 6.4 in); the narrative unfurls from right to left

== History ==
In a break from his usual practice, Yokoyama Taikan undertook detailed preliminary studies for Metempsychosis, drafting both a preparatory sketch and a practice roll (now in the collection of the Yokoyama Taikan Memorial Hall). For half a year from March 1923 he worked on the final scroll; over eighty metres of silk were used in the process. The final forty metre scroll was first displayed at the tenth Inten exhibition, which opened on 1 September 1923. Just hours later the exhibition closed due to the Great Kantō earthquake, which struck at 11:58. The artist is said to have recovered the scroll himself. Several months later the painting went on display in Kyōto. Acclaimed a masterpiece, it has been frequently exhibited and studied ever since and a full-size facsimile edition has been published. Yet, according to James Cahill, the painting, "hailed in its time as a masterwork ... from [a] more critical viewpoint might be seen as misusing the handscroll form by offering less of interesting visual material per running foot than handscrolls traditionally had offered".

== See also ==
- List of Cultural Properties of Japan - paintings (Tōkyō)
- Panta rhei (Heraclitus)
