= Statue of Mahamayuri on Colored Silk =

Oldest painting of Mahamayuri in Japan; Heian period, 10th National Treasure

- 絹本著色孔雀明王像 (kenpon choshoku kujaku myōōzō) (Japanese)
- Year: 12th century
- Catalogue: 00010
- Medium: silk painting
- Movement: Heian period art
- Subject: Mahamayuri
- Dimensions: 147.9 cm × 98.9 cm (58.2 in × 38.9 in)
- Designation: National Treasure
- Location: Tokyo National Museum, Tokyo
- Accession: A-11529

The Statue of Mahamayuri on Colored Silk is a 12th-century Heian period Buddhist painting depicting the bodhisattva Mahamayuri. Considered the oldest surviving work of the deity in Japan, and known for its polychromy and kirikane patterning, it is designated a National Treasure and is currently held by the Tokyo National Museum.

== Background ==
Mahamayuri features prominently in Chinese and Tibetan Buddhism, as a protective deity, originally identified as a female bodhisattva but sometimes referred to as a male. Due to the peacock's diet of snakes and bugs, the bodhisattva is seen as a protective figure who turns poison into beauty.

The earliest transmission of the text to Chinese Buddhist canon was dated to 402–412 by Kumārajīva, with its original foundational text, the Mahamayuri Vidyarajni Sutra first composed in the 4th century.

As a protective entity, the first images of the bodhisattva arrived in Japan during the Nara period at Saidai-ji's Yakushi Kon-dō (薬師金堂), a dedication by Empress Kōken during the Fujiwara no Nakamaro Rebellion.

The bodhisattva gained prominence during the Heian period, a result of the founding of Shingon Buddhism by Kūkai, who travelled to Tang China to disseminated further teaching of Buddhism in Japan. In 810, he preached the merits of the bodhisattva and the Mahamayuri Vidyarajni Sutra to Emperor Saga, stressing national security and protection from disasters. The basis of the painting stems from a commission by Kūkai from 821, referred to as the "Great Master". In the Ritual for Painting the Image and Setting Up the Altar of the Great Peacock King Buddha Mother (大孔雀明王畫像壇場儀軌), the following is stated as the image:

"The Myoo is depicted with four arms in a compassionate expression, wearing a white robe and decorated with ornaments. He sits in a lotus position on a lotus throne on a golden peacock, and in his four arms he holds an open lotus flower, a double fruit, an auspicious fruit, and a peacock tail."

Kūkai also established the protection ceremony of the deity primarily in Ninna-ji, where another National Treasure painting from the Song dynasty is currently held.

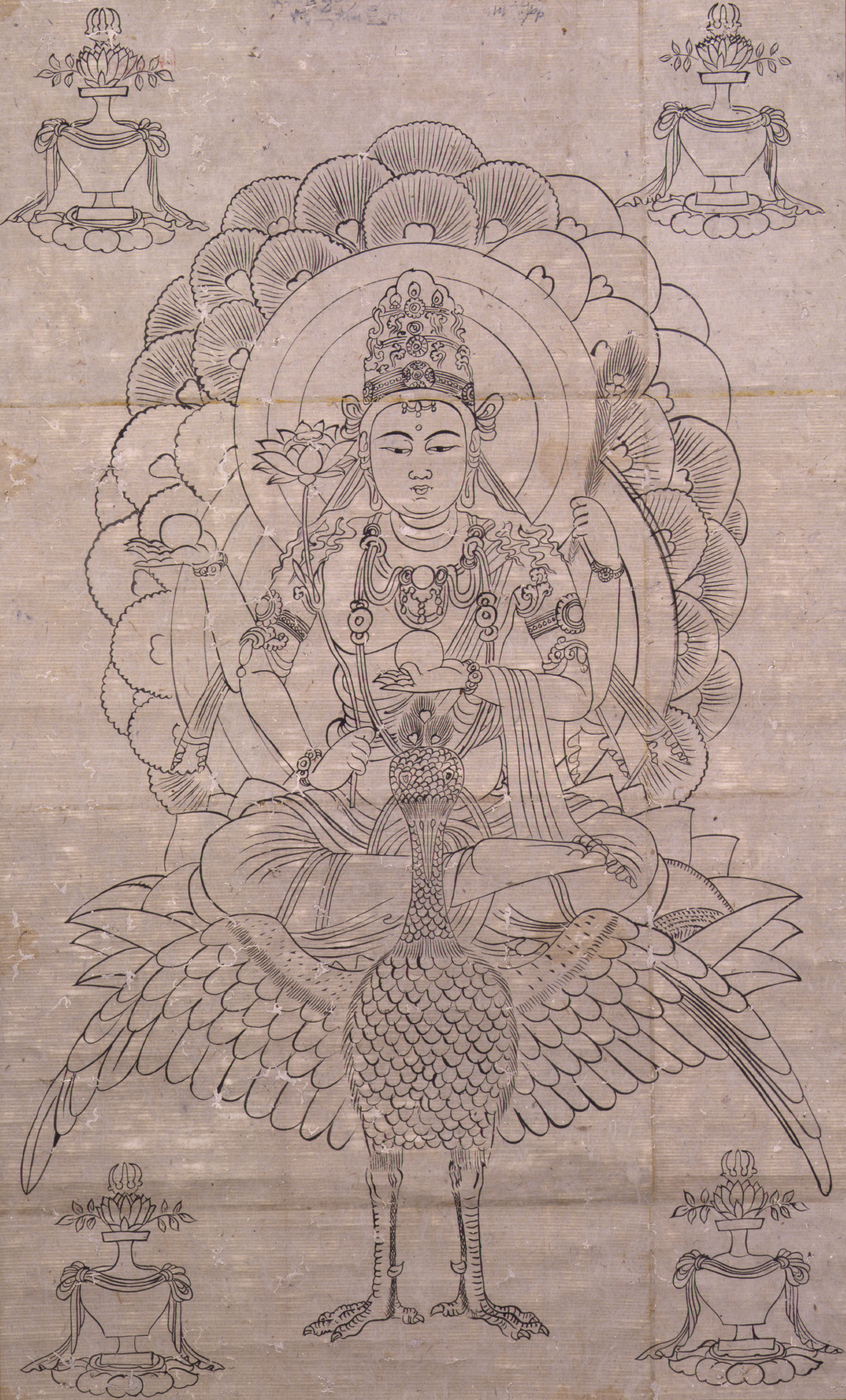
Outlined version of the painting, 12th century, formerly from Kōzan-ji (Tokyo National Museum)

The current image, held by the Tokyo National Museum, is the oldest surviving portrait, alongside an outlined image (hakubyo) also held by the museum, which came from Kōzan-ji. Designated under accession number A-11529, it received the designation of National Treasure on 9 June 1951, under designation number 00010.

== Description ==
The bodhisattva is seen seated on the peacock, depicted with one face and two pairs of arms (differing from the Ninna-ji Song dynasty version, which has three faces, and three pairs of arms).

A lotus and a watermelon is held on the right hands, while a pomergranate and peacock feathers is held by the left hands. Mahamayuri is placed in frontal position, surrounded by decorative vases on each corner of the painting, in the manner of a mandala.

The body of Mahamayuri is painted white, accentuated by peach, orange, green and vermilion. Vermilion is also featured in both the robes, mandorla, and the peacock. The robes utilize green, blue, and gold, with texture formed thru gold leaf via kirikane. The peacock is painted with rich greens, blues and gold, a testament to the refined polychromy utilized during the Insei era of the Heian period.

== Conservation ==
In 1994, the Tokyo National Museum utilized infrared image in restoring the image, which involved ascertaining the ink outlines of the painting.

In 2016, a reproduction of the painting utilizing traditional crafts and tools became a special exhibit in the museum which honed in on the focus of kirikane craftmanship.

In 2021, the Tsuzuri Project, an initiative by Canon to preserve Japanese masterpieces through imaging and the production of facsimiles, completed a copy of the painting which was then given to the National Institutes of Cultural Heritage. Digitizing the painting allowed the replica to be accurate down to a 0.2 mm degree along with the skills of artisans in Kyoto.

== See also ==
- List of National Treasures of Japan (paintings)
- List of Cultural Properties of Japan – paintings (Tokyo)
