= Artizon Museum =

Art museum in Tokyo, Japan

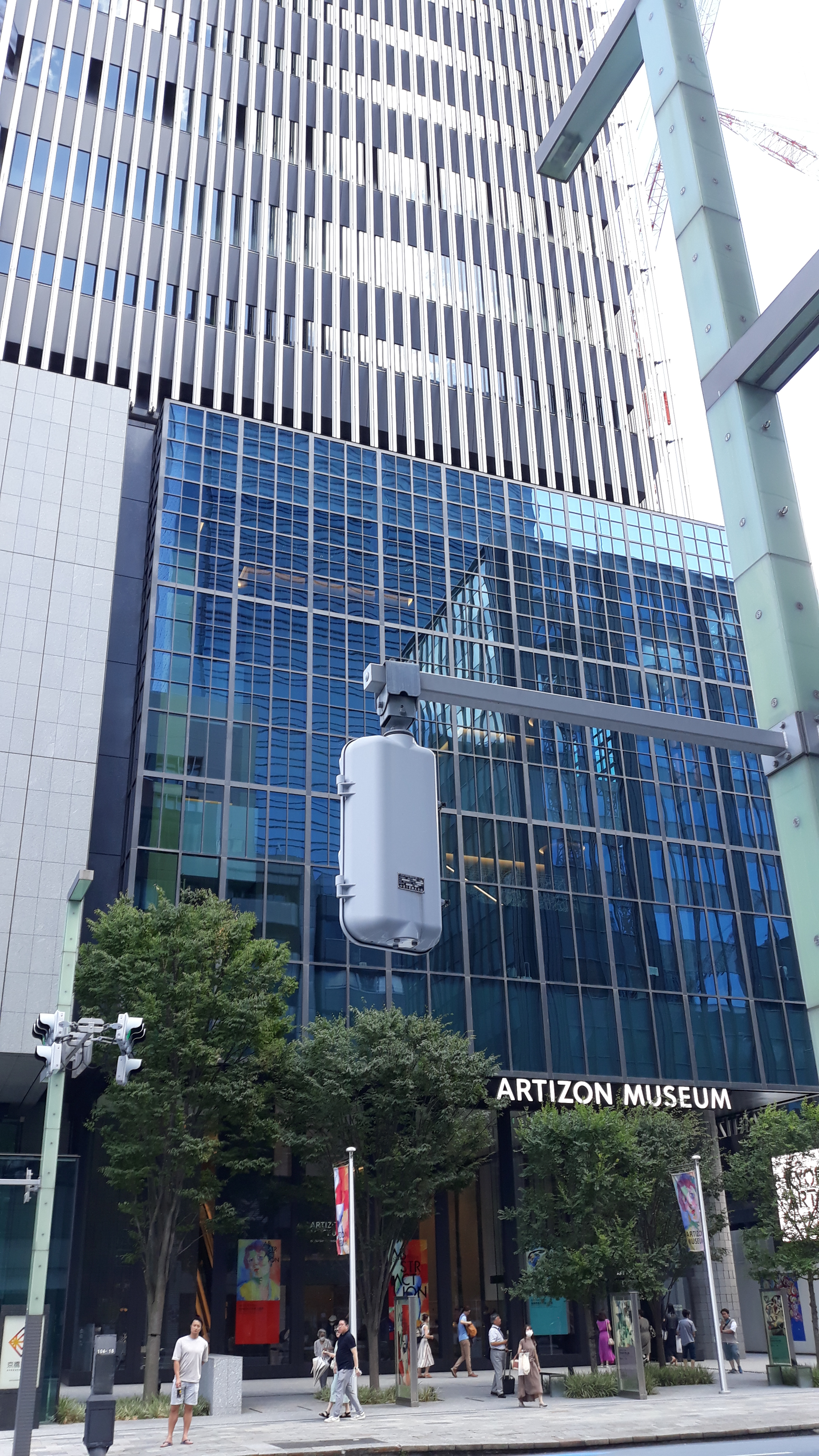
- The Artizon Museum in its new location
- Interactive fullscreen map
- Location: Tokyo, Japan
- Coordinates: 35°40′44″N 139°46′19″E

Artizon Museum Aatizon Bijutukan (アーティゾン美術館), until 2018 Bridgestone Museum of Art (ブリヂストン美術館, Burijisuton Bijutsukan), is an art museum in Tokyo, Japan.

The museum was founded in 1952 by the founder of Bridgestone Tire Co., Ishibashi Shojiro. The museum's collections include Impressionists, Post-Impressionists and twentieth-century art by Japanese, European and American artists, as well as ceramic works from Ancient Greece. The museum is located in the Museum Tower Kyobashi, a 25 floor office building in the Yaesu-Kyobashi area of Tokyo.

== History ==
The museum was founded in 1952 by Ishibashi Shojiro, founder of Bridgestone Tire Co. (his family name means stone bridge).

The museum hosted the first major retrospective in Japan dedicated to Italian architect Ettore Sottsass in 2026.

=== Closure and eventual reopening ===
The museum was located in the headquarters of the Bridgestone Corporation in Chūō, Tokyo. This building was demolished in 2015 and the Museum Tower Kyobashi was erected in its place.

The museum closed its doors on 18 May 2015 and reopened again in January 2020. The museum's new name was announced in 2018, combining the words "art" and "horizon". During the long-term closure, various items from the museum's collection have been loaned out for display in other institutions.

== Selected artists ==
- Edgar Degas
- Pierre-Auguste Renoir
- Camille Pissarro
- Édouard Manet
- Vincent van Gogh
- Paul Gauguin
- Gustave Moreau
- Paul Cézanne
- Claude Monet
- Amedeo Clemente Modigliani
- Maurice Denis
- Georges Rouault
- Pablo Picasso
- Paul Klee
- Narashige Koide
- Tsuguharu Foujita
- Fujishima Takeji
- Shigeru Aoki

== Selected collection highlights ==
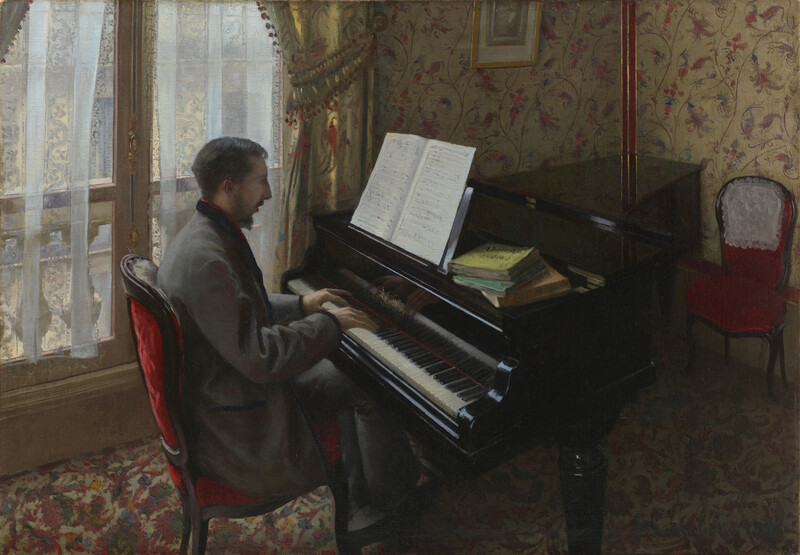
Young Man Playing the Piano, Gustave Caillebotte

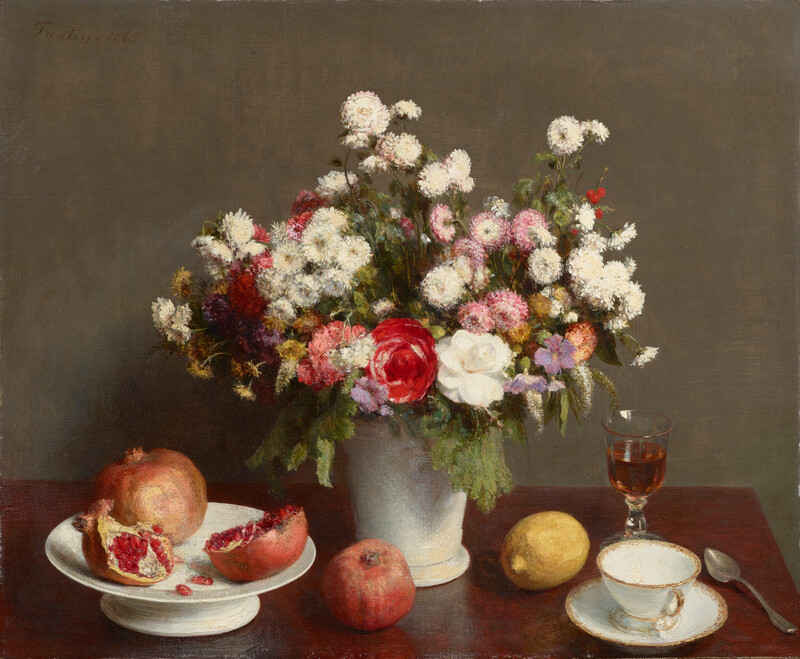
Still Life with Flowers, Fruits, Wineglass and Tea Cup, Henri Fantin-Latour

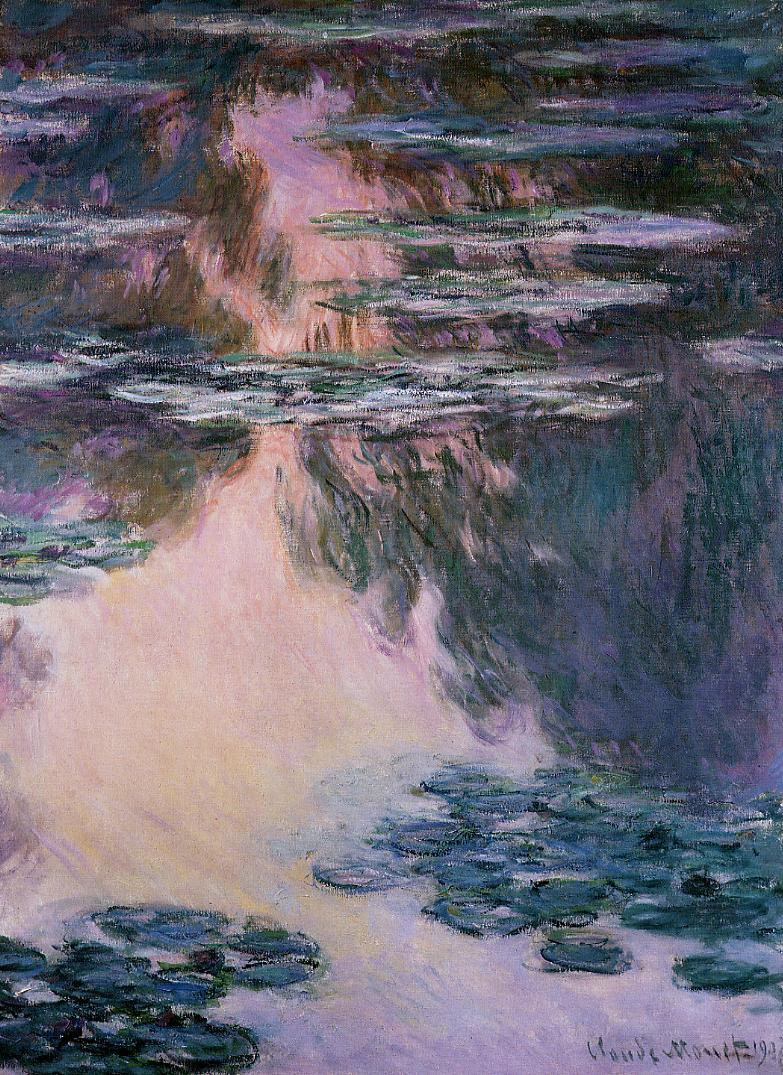
Water-Lilies, Claude Monet

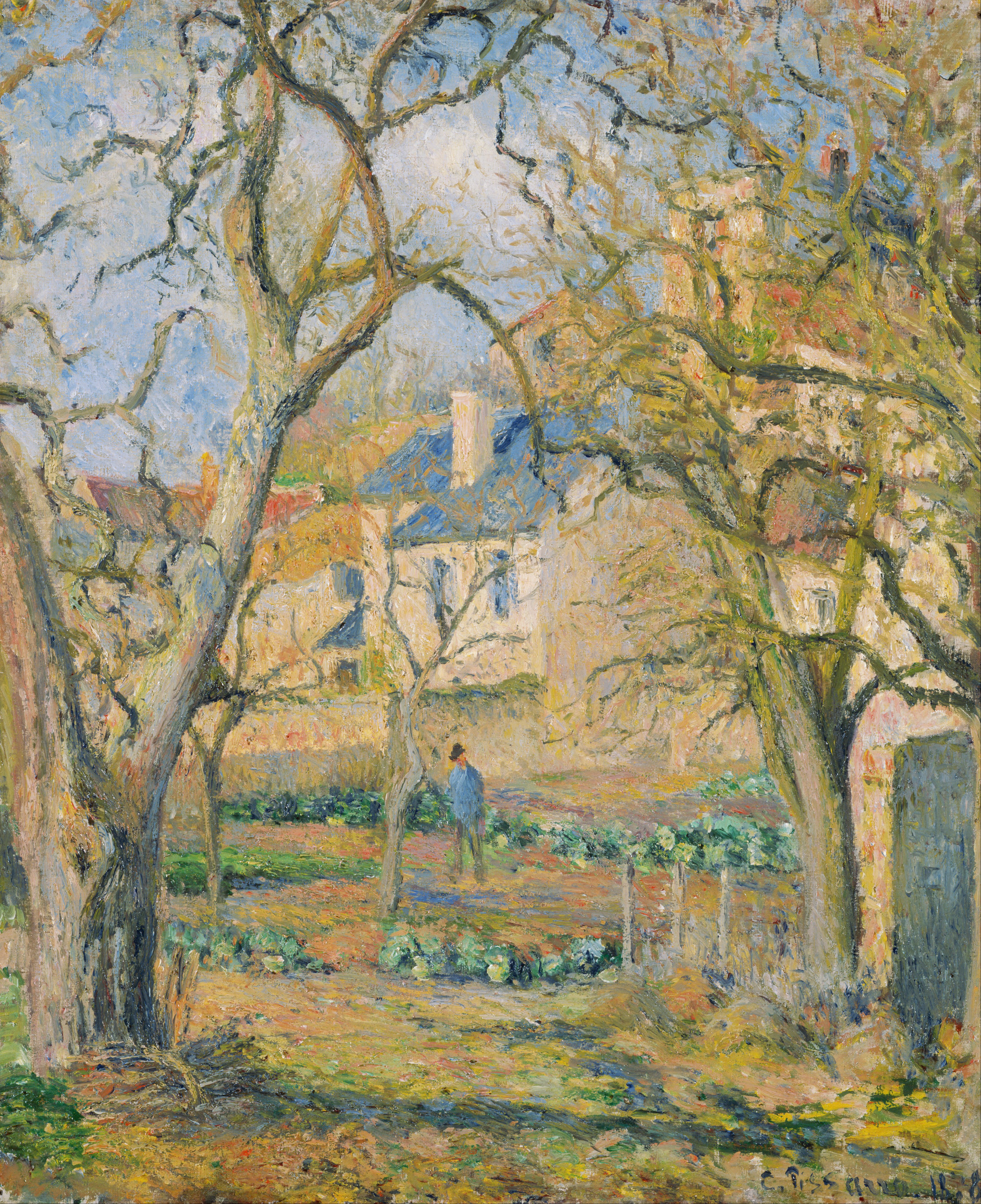
Vegetable garden, Camille Pissarro

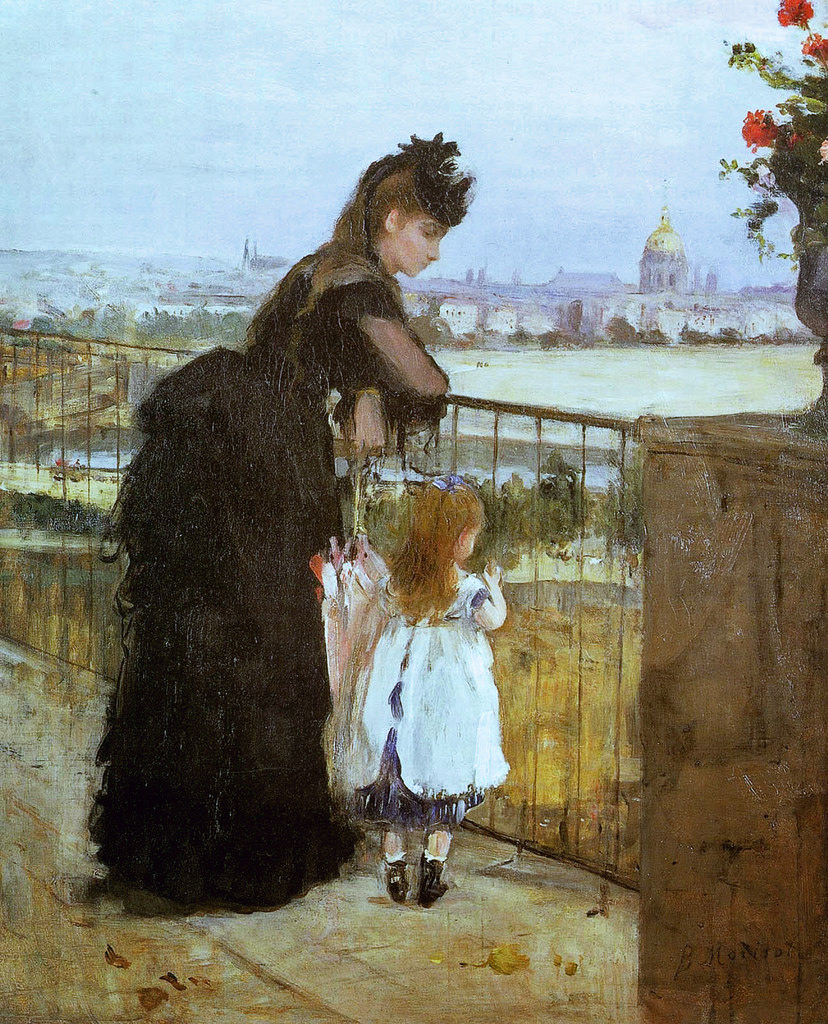
Woman and child on a balcony, Berthe Morisot

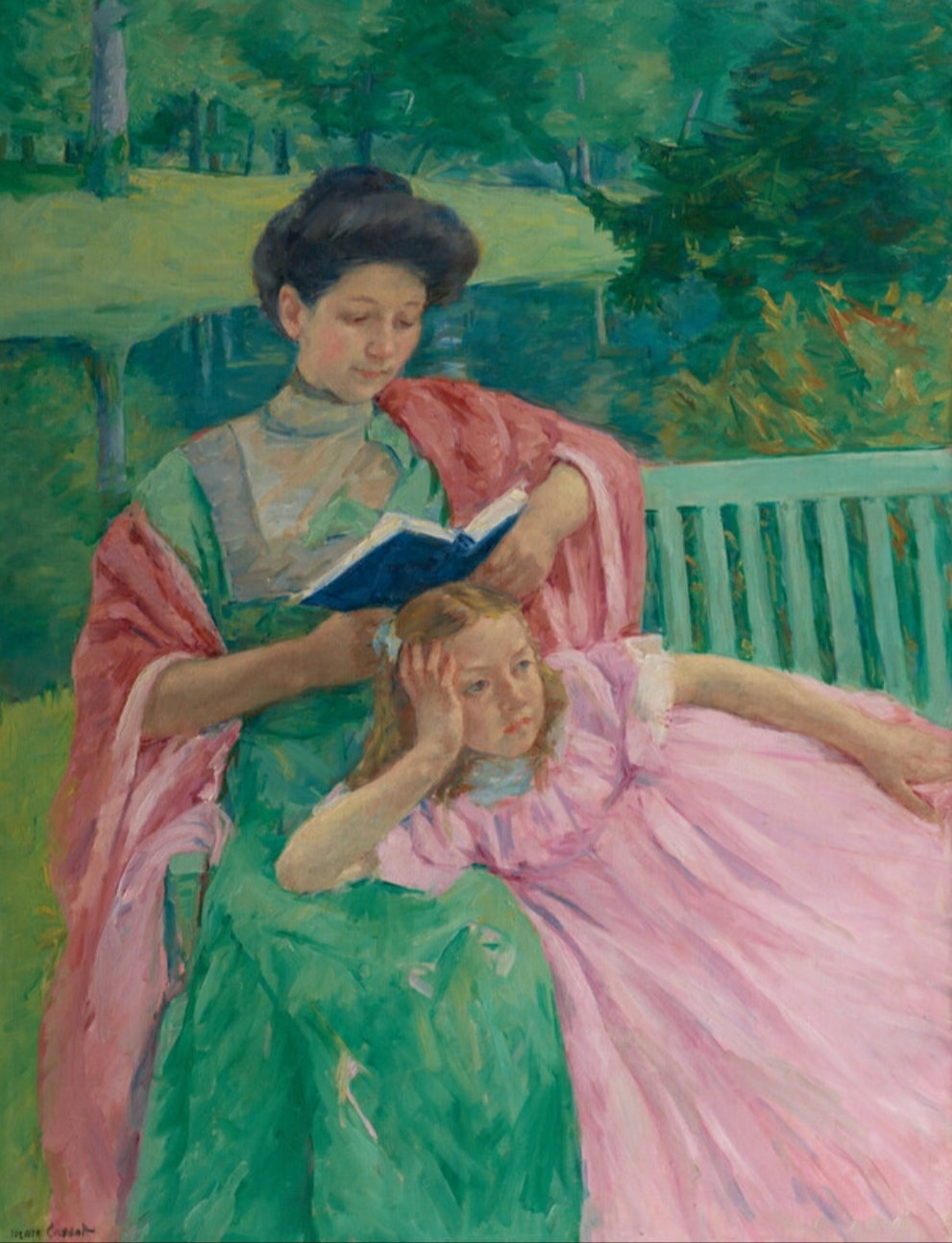
Augusta Reading to Her Daughter, Mary Cassatt

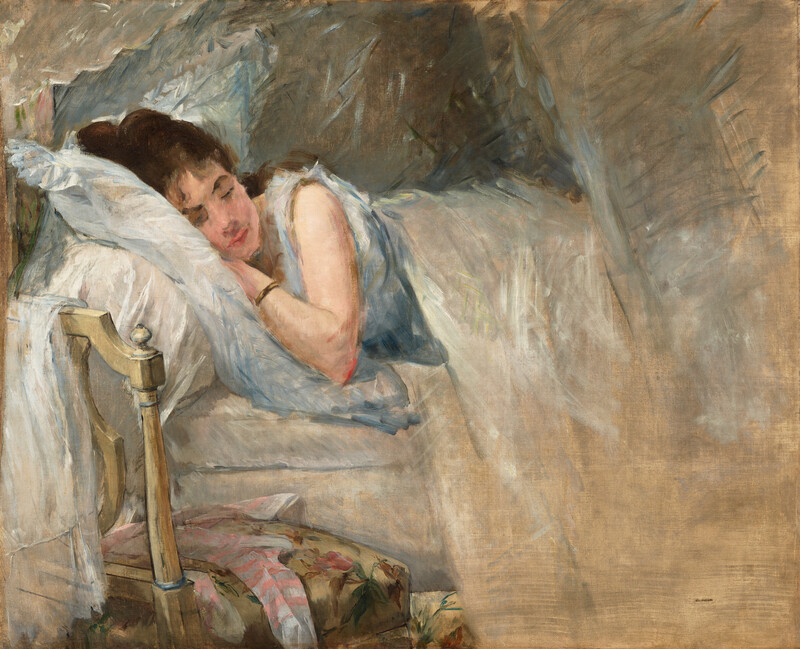
Sleep, Eva Gonzalès

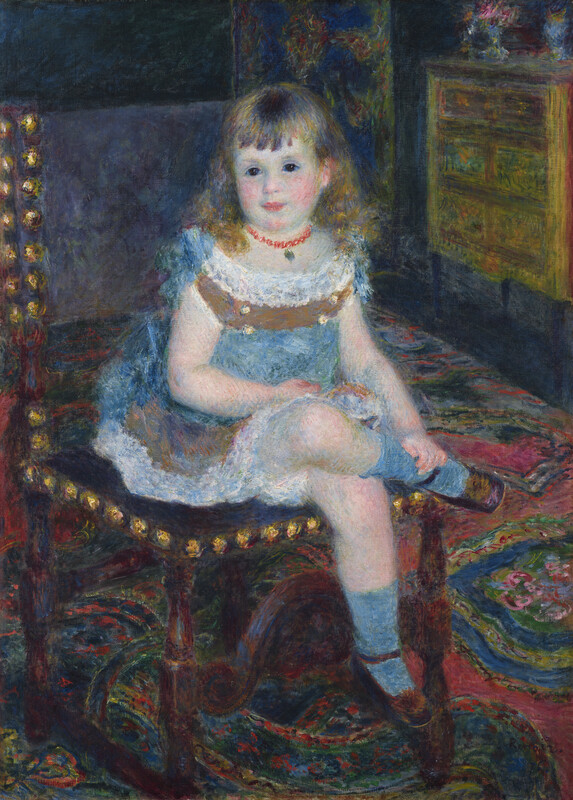
Georgette Charpentier, Pierre-Auguste Renoir.

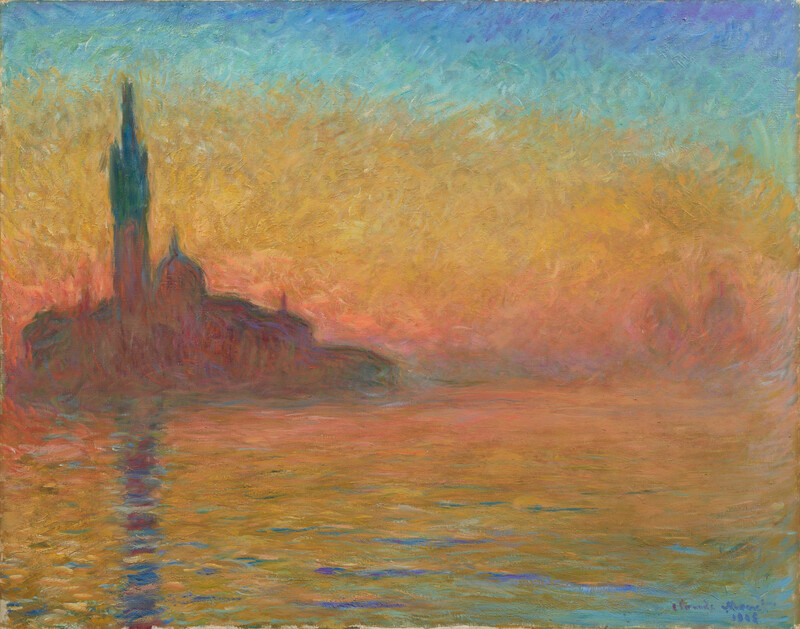
San Giorgio Maggiore at Dusk, Claude Monet

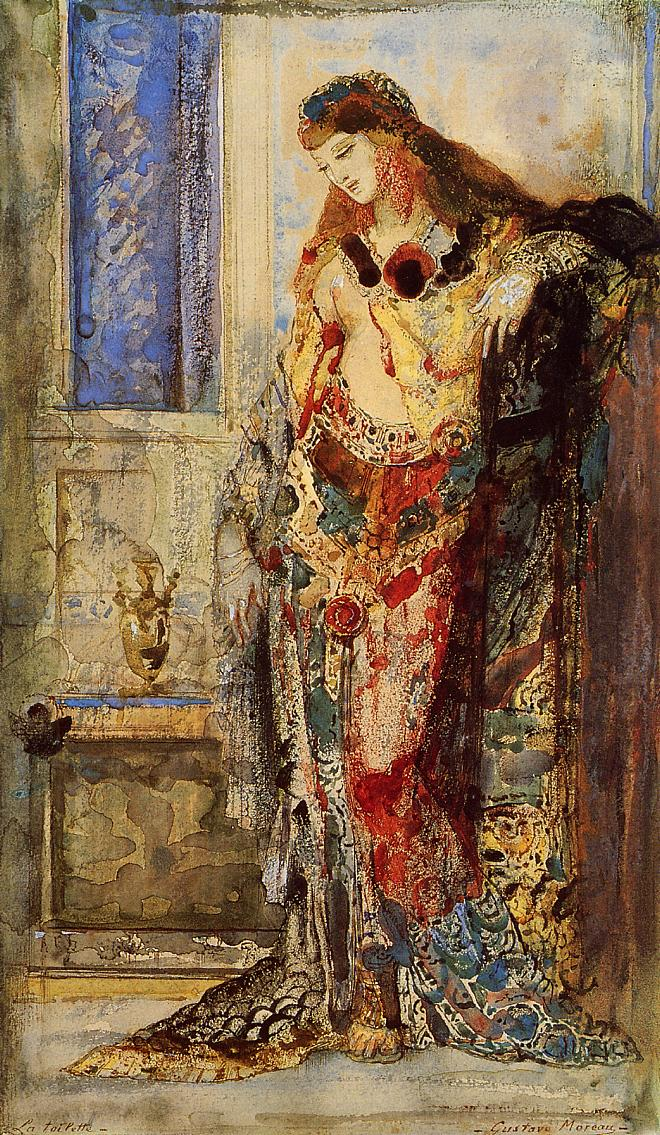
La Toilette, Gustave Moreau

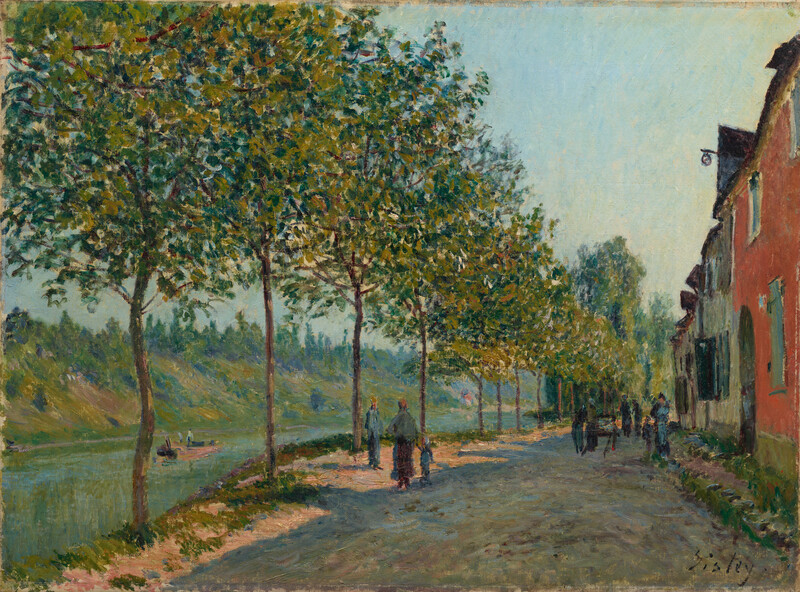
June Morning in Saint-Mammès, Alfred Sisley

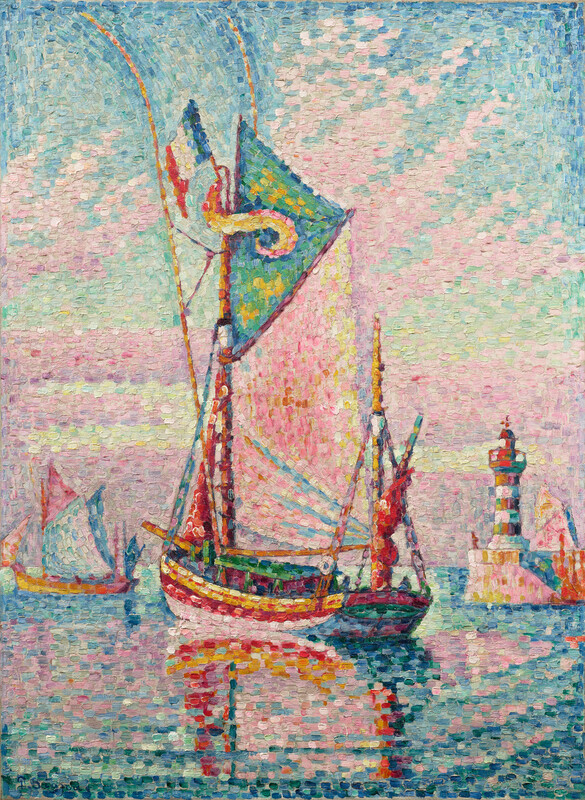
Port of Concarneau, Paul Signac

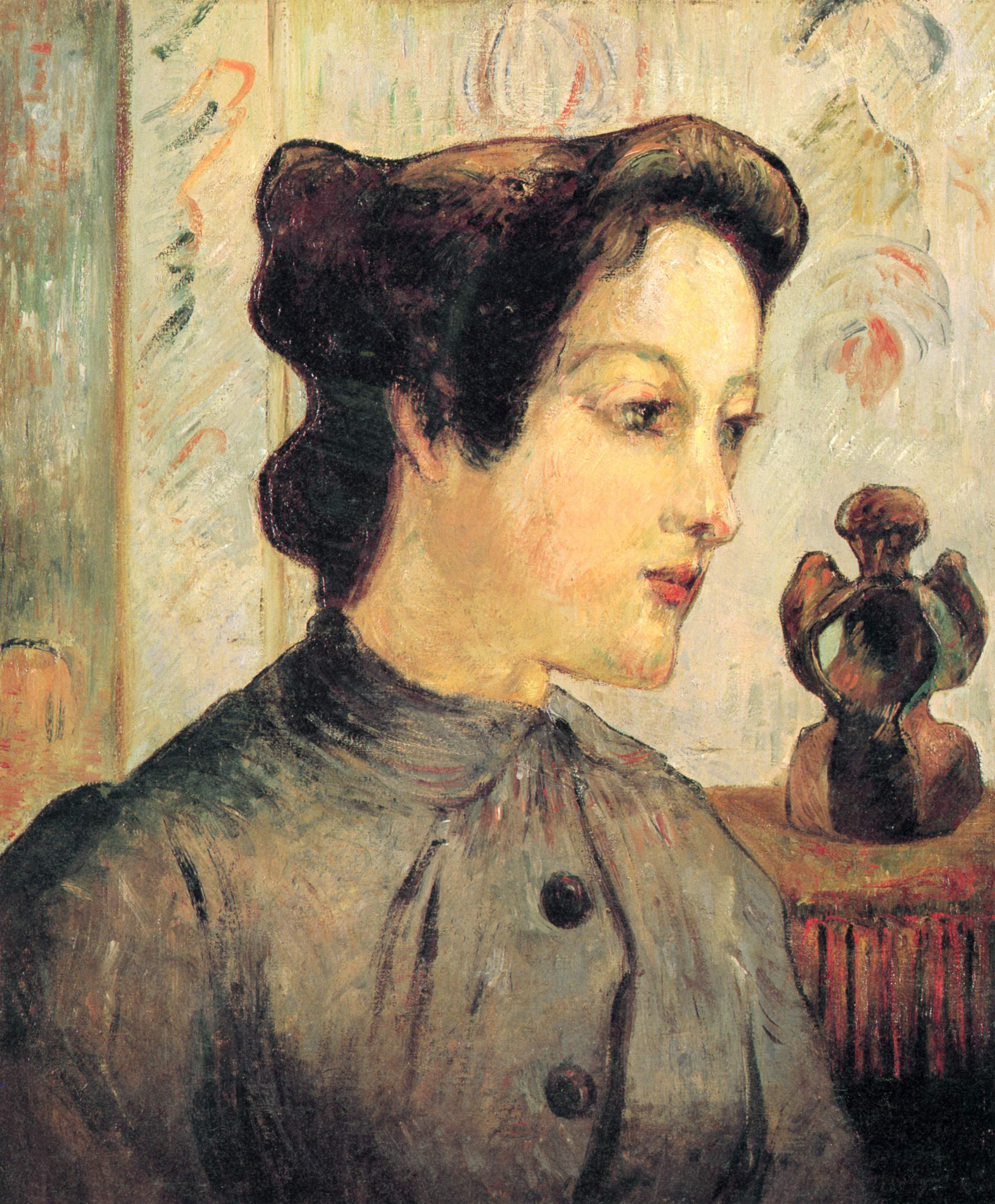
Portrait of a Young Woman, Paul Gauguin

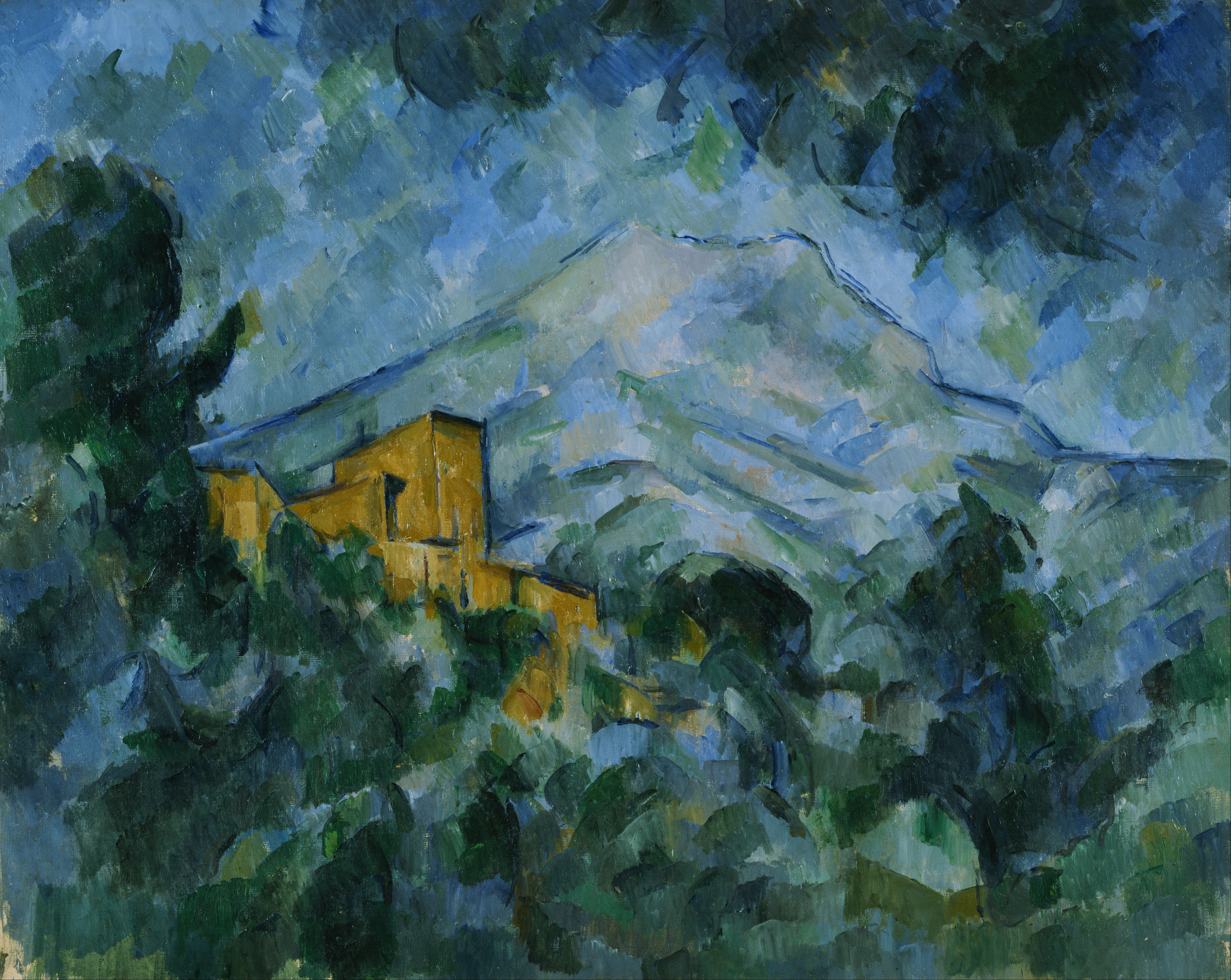
Mont Sainte-Victoire and Château Noir, Paul Cezanne

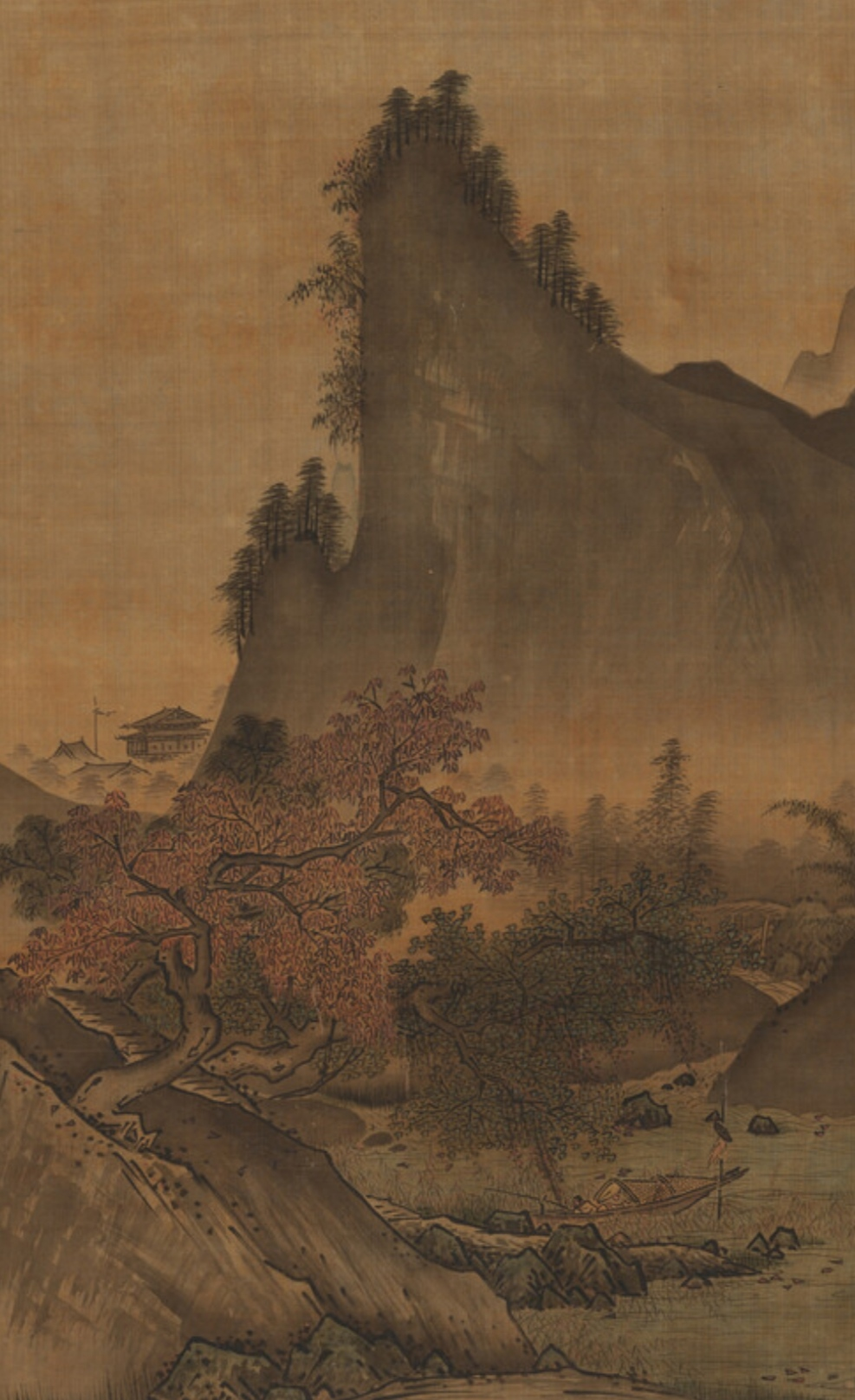
Spring, Sesshū Tōyō

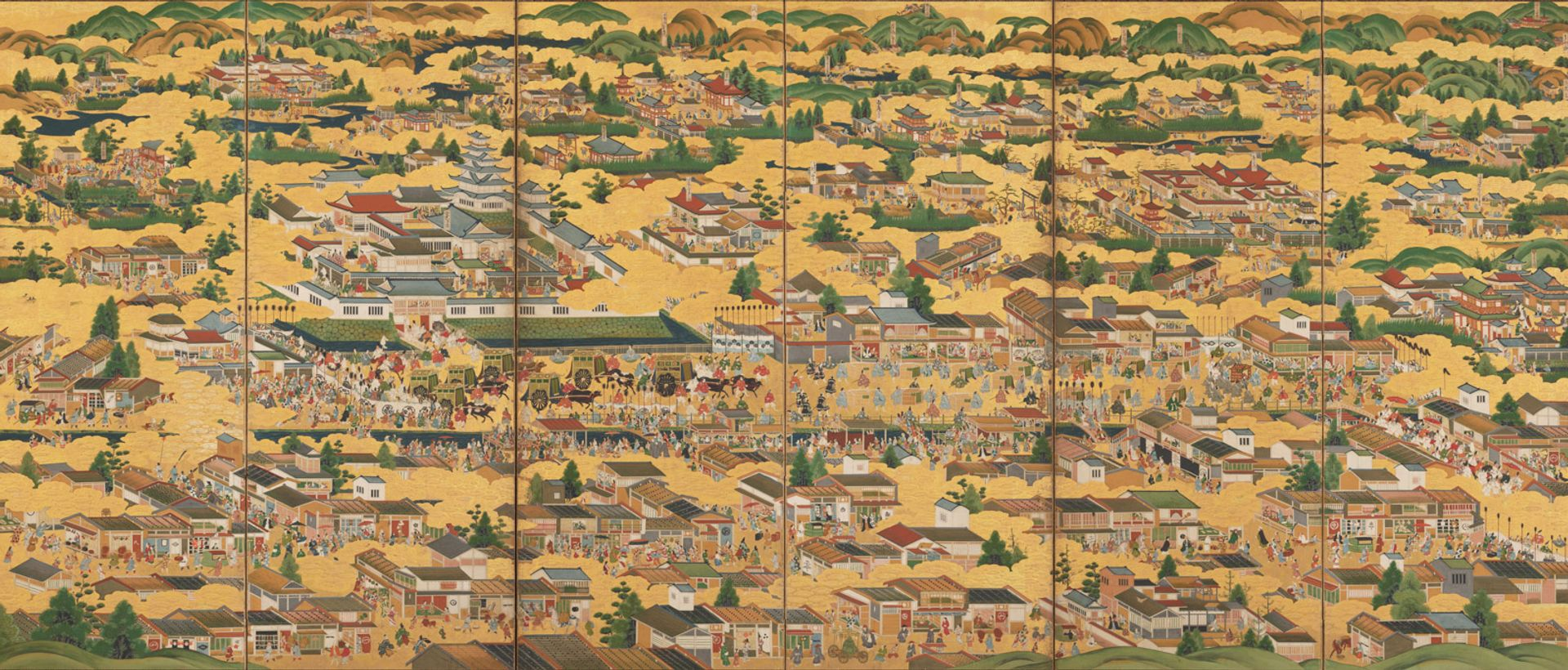
Views in and around the City of Kyoto, Unknown Edo period artist

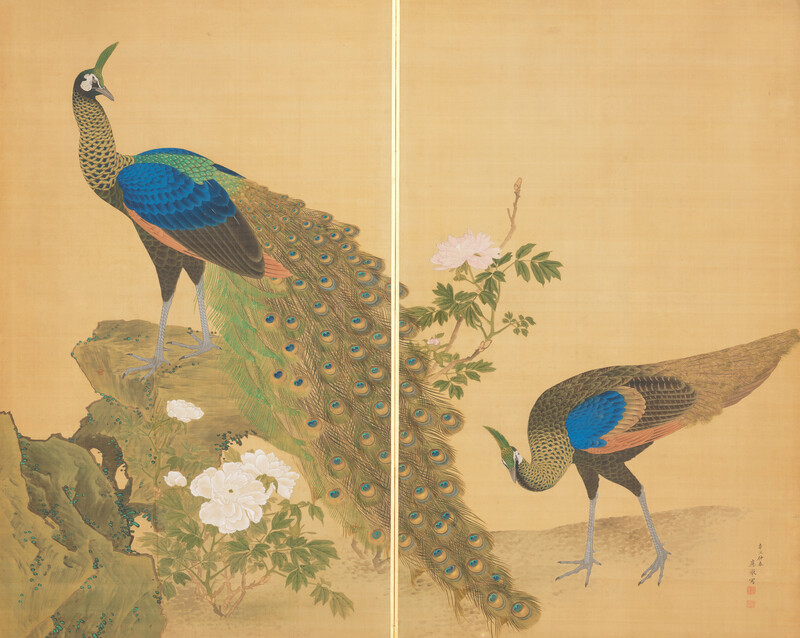
Peony and Peacocks, Maruyama Ōkyo

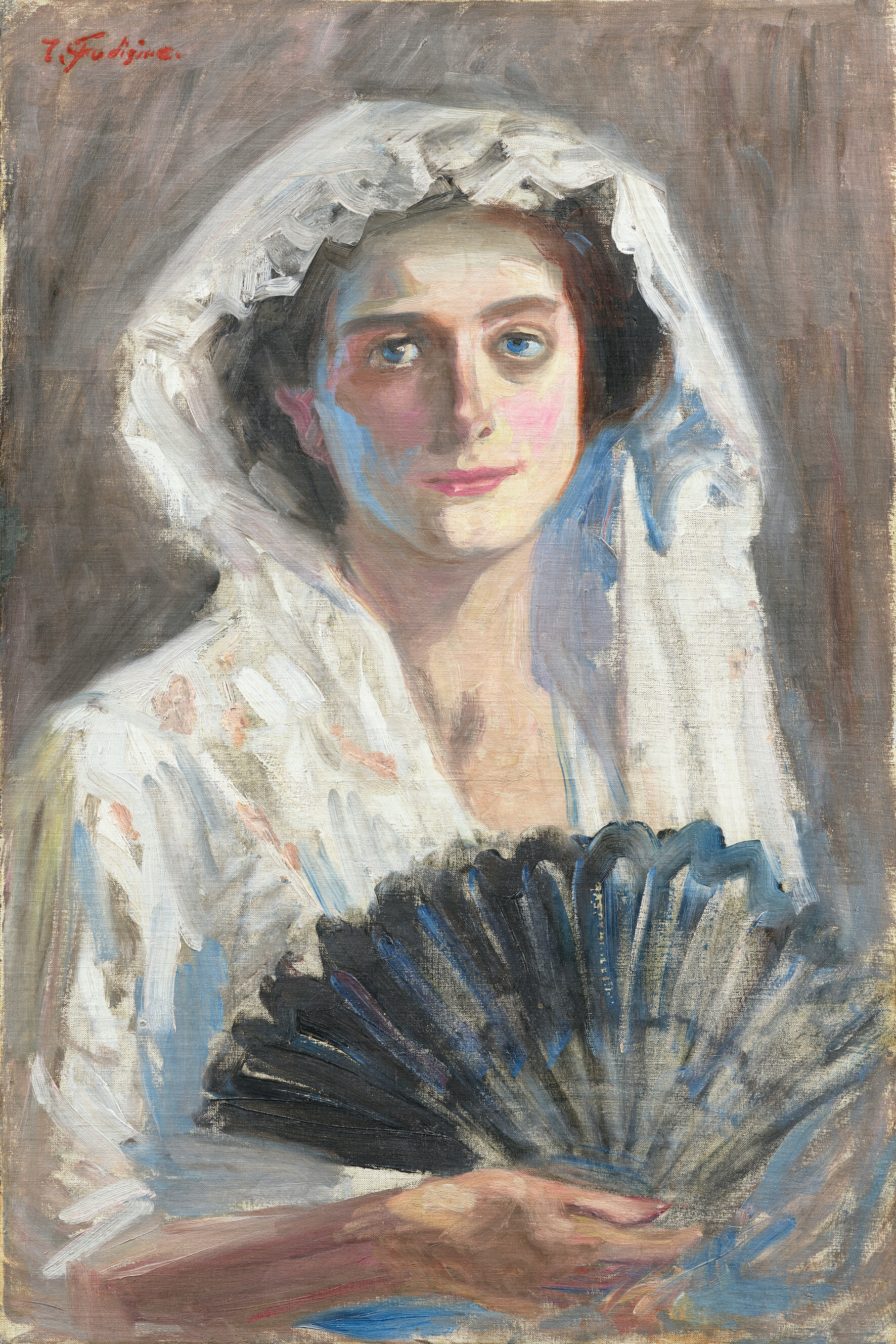
Black Fan, Fujishima Takeji

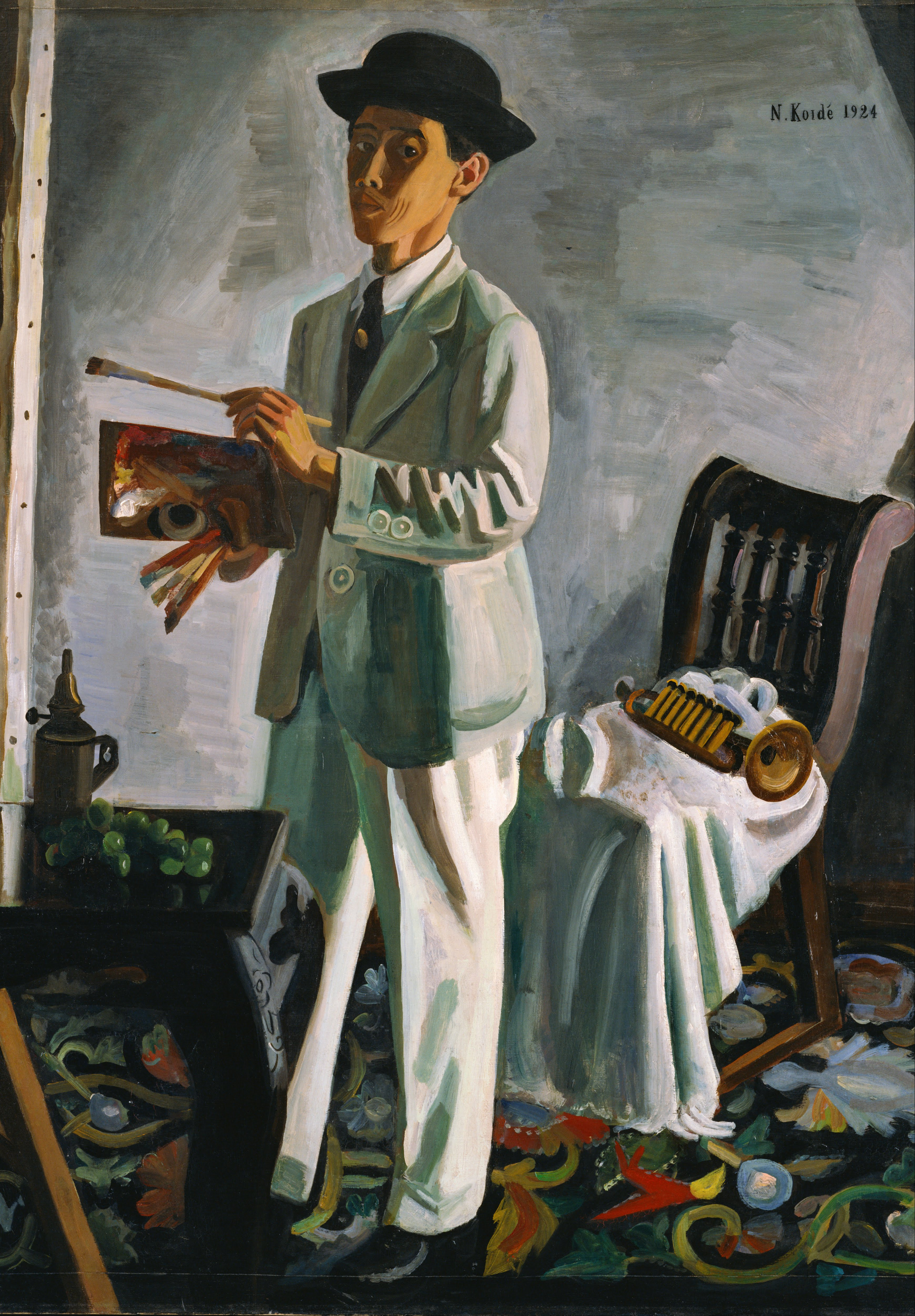
Self-Portrait with a Hat, Koide Narashige

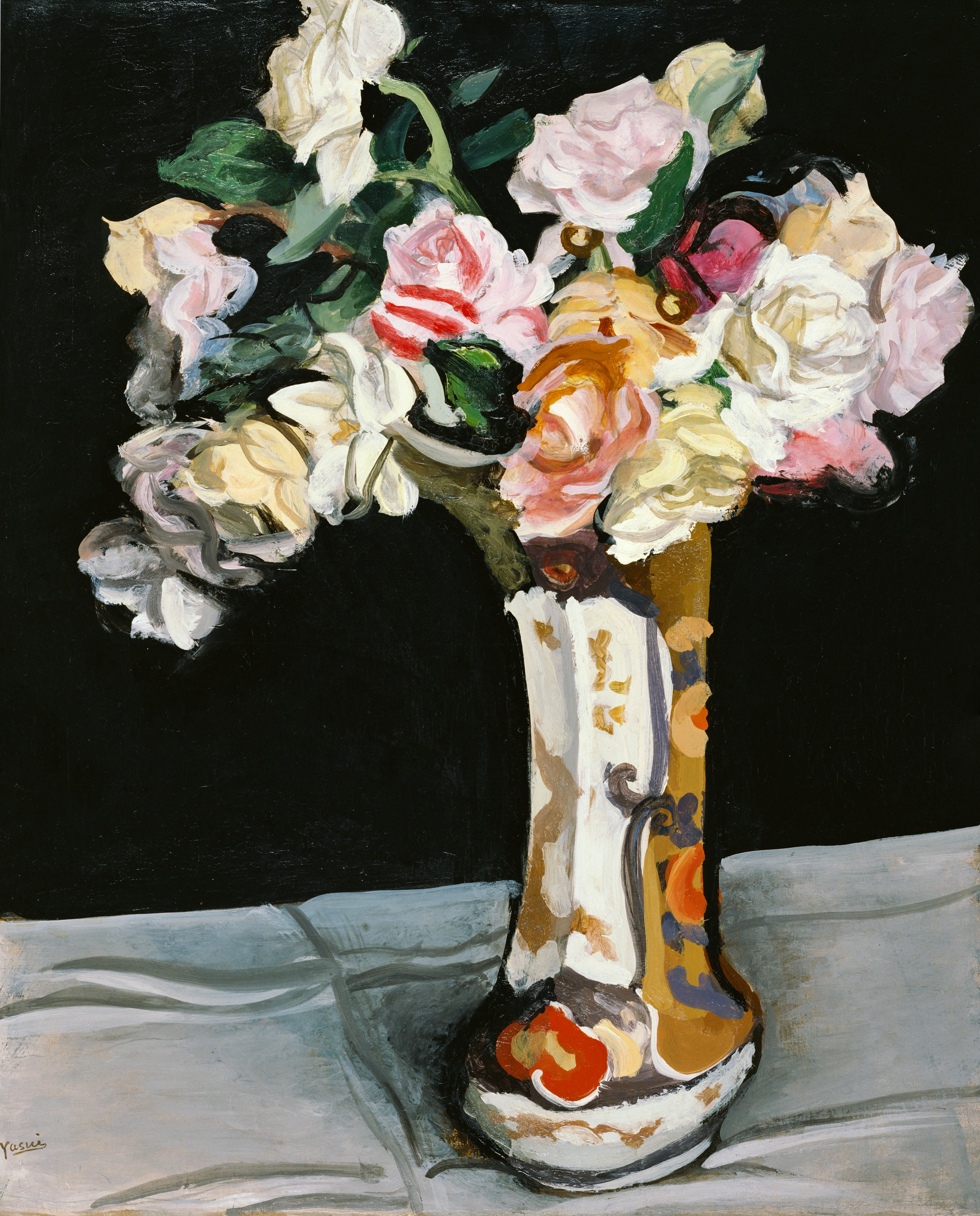
Roses, Yasui Sotaro

== Ishibashi Foundation Art Research Center ==
The Ishibashi Foundation Art Research Center (石橋財団アートリサーチセンター) opened in Machida in 2015 as a research facility for the Artizon Museum. Focused upon the research, storage, and preservation and restoration of the collection, since 2017 school groups have been welcomed, there are also lectures and workshops for the public, and a library open to researchers.

== Publications ==
The museum has published a number of books about its collection and special exhibitions.

== See also ==
- List of Cultural Properties of Japan - paintings (Tōkyō)
- Ishibashi Museum of Art
