= Yokoyama Taikan =

Japanese painter (1868-1958)

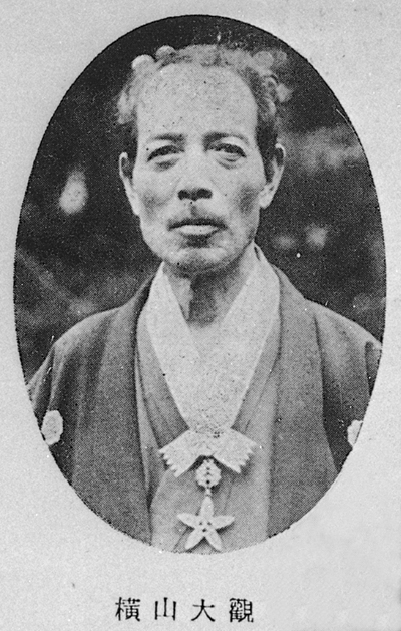
- Yokoyama Taikan
- Born: Sakai Hidemaro; November 2, 1868; Mito, Ibaraki, Japan
- Died: February 26, 1958 (aged 89); Tokyo, Japan
- Known for: Painter
- Movement: Nihonga
- Awards: Asahi Prize (1933); Order of Culture; Order of the Rising Sun

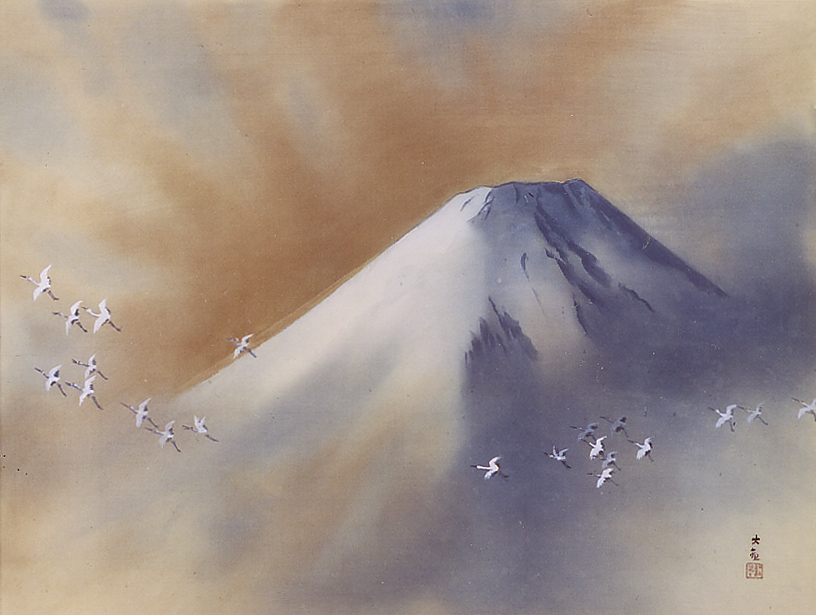
Snowy Peak with Cranes

Yokoyama Taikan (Note: Japanese pronunciation: [jo.koꜜ.ja.ma | taꜜi.kaɴ, jo.ko.ja.ma taꜜi.kaɴ, jo.koꜜ.ja.ma (|) tai.kaɴ]) (横山 大観; November 2, 1868 – February 26, 1958) was the art-name of a major figure in pre-World War II Japanese painting. He is notable for helping create the Japanese painting technique of Nihonga.

== Early life ==
Sakai Hidemaro (known as Yokoyama Taikan) was born in Mito city, Ibaraki Prefecture, as the eldest son of Sakai Sutehiko, a samurai serving the Mito clan. His earliest name was Hidezō, and later Hidematsu. With his family, he moved to Tokyo in 1878. He studied at the Tōkyō Furitsu Daiichi Chūgakkō (today's Hibiya High School), and was interested in the English language and in Western-style oil painting. This led him to study pencil drawing with a painter, Watanabe Fumisaburō. In 1888, he was adopted into his mother's family, taking the surname "Yokoyama" and changed his personal name to Hidemaro.

In 1889, Yokoyama enrolled in the first graduating class of the Tōkyō Bijutsu Gakkō (the predecessor to the Tokyo University of the Arts), which had just been opened by Okakura Kakuzō (aka Okakura Tenshin). In school, he studied under the Kanō school artist Hashimoto Gahō. Several of his classmates also later became famous artists: Hishida Shunsō, Shimomura Kanzan, and Saigō Kogetsu.

After graduation, Yokoyama spent a year teaching at "Kyōto Shiritsu Bijutsu Kōgei Gakkō" (the predecessor to the Kyoto City University of Arts) in Kyoto, studying Buddhist painting. Around that time, he started to use the art-name "Taikan". He returned to Tokyo in 1896 as assistant professor at the Tōkyō Bijutsu Gakkō. He resigned that position only a year later, when his mentor, Okakura Kakuzō (aka Okakura Tenshin), was forced to resign for political reasons, and joined Okakura in establishing the Japan Fine Arts Academy (Nihon Bijutsuin).

After the death of his wife, Yokoyama traveled extensively overseas, visiting Calcutta, New York City, Boston, London, Berlin and Paris.

== Artistic career ==
In 1914, after his ouster from the Bunten Fine Arts Exhibition sponsored by the Ministry of Education, Yokoyama concentrated on reviving the Japan Fine Arts Academy, which had closed down upon Okakura Kakuzō's death in 1913. The annual exhibitions of the Japan Fine Arts Academy, which had the abbreviated name Inten, became one of the most important, non-governmental outlets for young talents. One of the chief sponsors of Taikan at this time was the silk merchant and art patron Hara Tomitarō. His influence in the university was strong even in other creative fields. He brought up for example Hakuo Iriyama, educated into a lacquer artist, that developed original painting and printing techniques based on dry lacquer techniques and pigmented lacquer.

Taikan was extremely influential in the evolution of the Nihonga technique, having departed from the traditional method of line drawing. Together with Hishida Shunsō, he developed a new style, eliminating the lines and concentrating on soft, blurred polychromes. While Yokoyama's works tended to remain faithful in general to the traditional Rinpa school style, he experimented with various techniques borrowed from Western painting methods. However, such a cutting-edge technique was severely criticized by other traditional painters. His style, which was called "Mourou-tai(Blurred style)" (which nowadays exactly depicts his painting's character), meant the lack of energy and vitality sarcastically. He later turned almost exclusively to monochrome ink paintings, and came to be known for his mastery of the various tones and shades of black. A number of his works have been classified as Important Cultural Property by the Agency for Cultural Affairs.

His trip to Calcutta in 1902 was immensely important for the evolution of global Modernism, as it resulted in a seminal exchange both of technique and motif with the important early Indian Modernist Abanindranath Tagore.

In the pre-World War II era, Taikan was sent to Italy by the Japanese government as an official representative of the Japanese artistic community. Because his teacher Okakura Tenshin was a nationalist (known as a loyal philosopher in the Meiji era as well), Taikan was very much influenced by his thoughts. Consequently, he repeatedly used Mount Fuji as a motif of his paintings, and even presented them to the Imperial family. During World War II, he donated his earnings from the sales of his paintings to the national military, and this resulted in his arrest and interrogation by SCAP after the Surrender of Japan. In 1935, he was appointed to the Imperial Arts Academy (the forerunner of the Japan Art Academy), and in 1937, he was one of the first people to be awarded the Order of Culture when it was established in 1937. He was also awarded the Order of the Rising Sun, first class.

On 26 February 1958, Yokoyama Taikan died in Tokyo at the age of eighty-nine; his former house is now open to the public as the Yokoyama Taikan Memorial Museum. His brain is preserved in formaldehyde at the University of Tokyo Medical School.

== Notable works ==
- Eight famous sights along the Xiao River and the Xiang River (瀟湘八景, 1912, Important Cultural Property, Tokyo National Museum)
- Metempsychosis (生々流転, 1924), Important Cultural Property, National Museum of Modern Art, Tokyo
- Cherry Blossoms at Night (夜桜, 1929), Okura Museum of Art)
- Autumn Leaves (紅葉, 1931, Adachi Museum of Art)
- A Day in the Pacific Ocean (或る日の太平洋, 1952, National Museum of Modern Art, Tokyo)

== Honours and legacy ==
- Order of Culture (1937)
- Person of Cultural Merit (1951)
- Grand Cordon of the Order of the Rising Sun (26 February 1958, posthumous)

=== Order of precedence ===
- Senior third rank (26 February 1958, posthumous)

=== Tribute ===
On November 2, 2011, Google celebrated his 143rd birthday with a Google Doodle.

== Philately ==
Several of Yokoyama's works have been selected by the Japanese government to appear on commemorative postage stamps :

- 1967: Snowy Peak with Cranes (1958), as part of the International Tourist Year commemoration, now at the Yokoyama Taikan Memorial Museum, Tokyo
- 1983: Muga (1896), as part of the Modern Art series, now located at the Tokyo National Museum
- 1985: Night Sakura (1929) se-tenant pair of stamps commemorating the 50th anniversary of Radio Japan, now at Okura Museum of Art, Tokyo
