= Shigeru Aoki =

Japanese painter

Aoki Shigeru
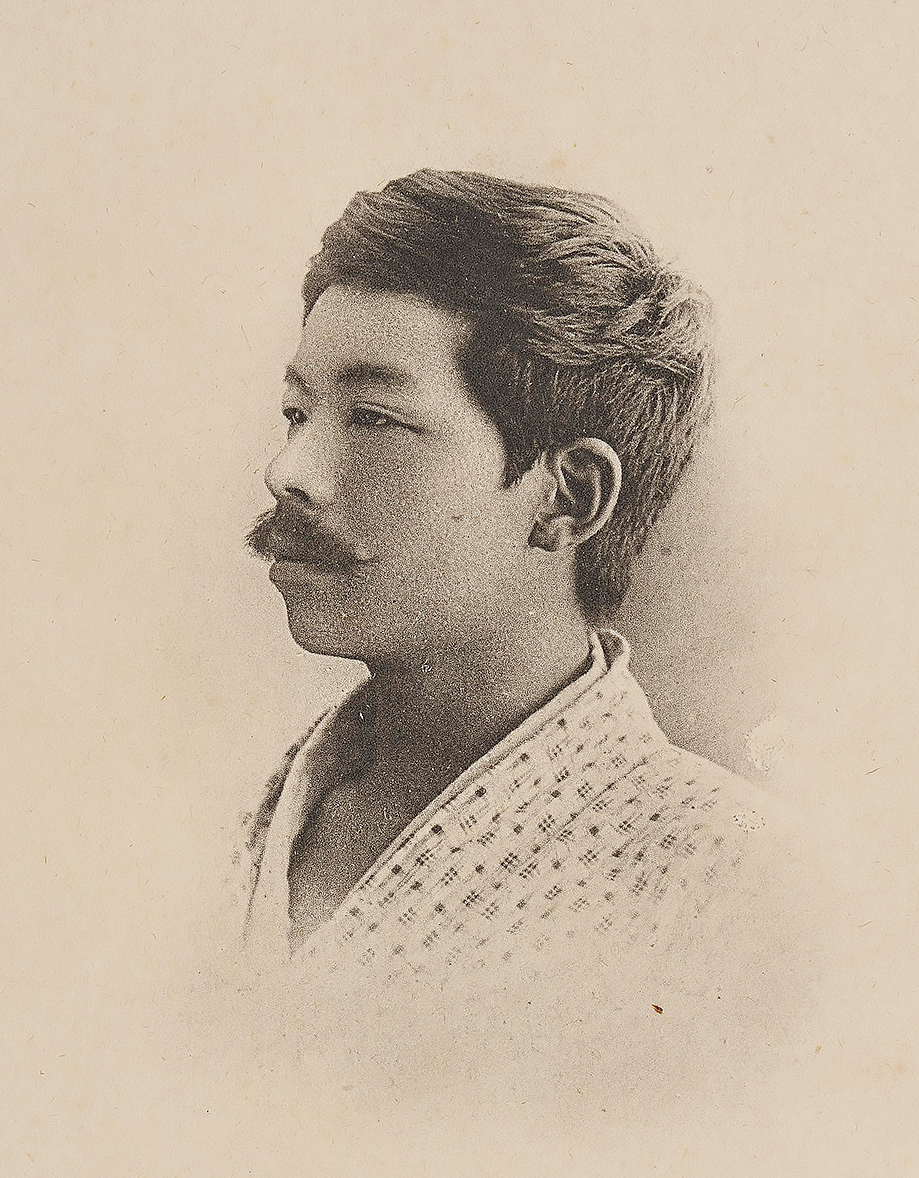
- Aoki Shigeru
- Born: July 13, 1882; Kurume, Fukuoka, Japan
- Died: March 25, 1911 (aged 28); Fukuoka, Japan
- Known for: Painter
- Movement: Yoga

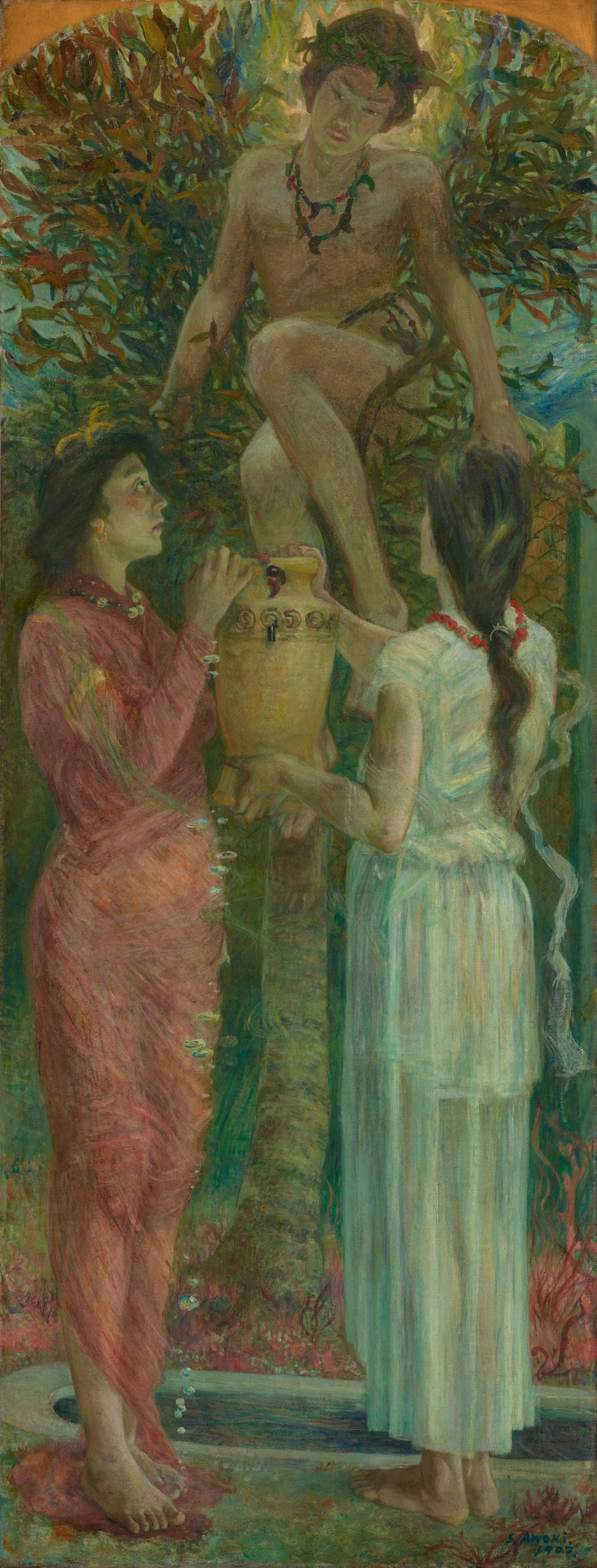
Paradise Under the Sea, 1907

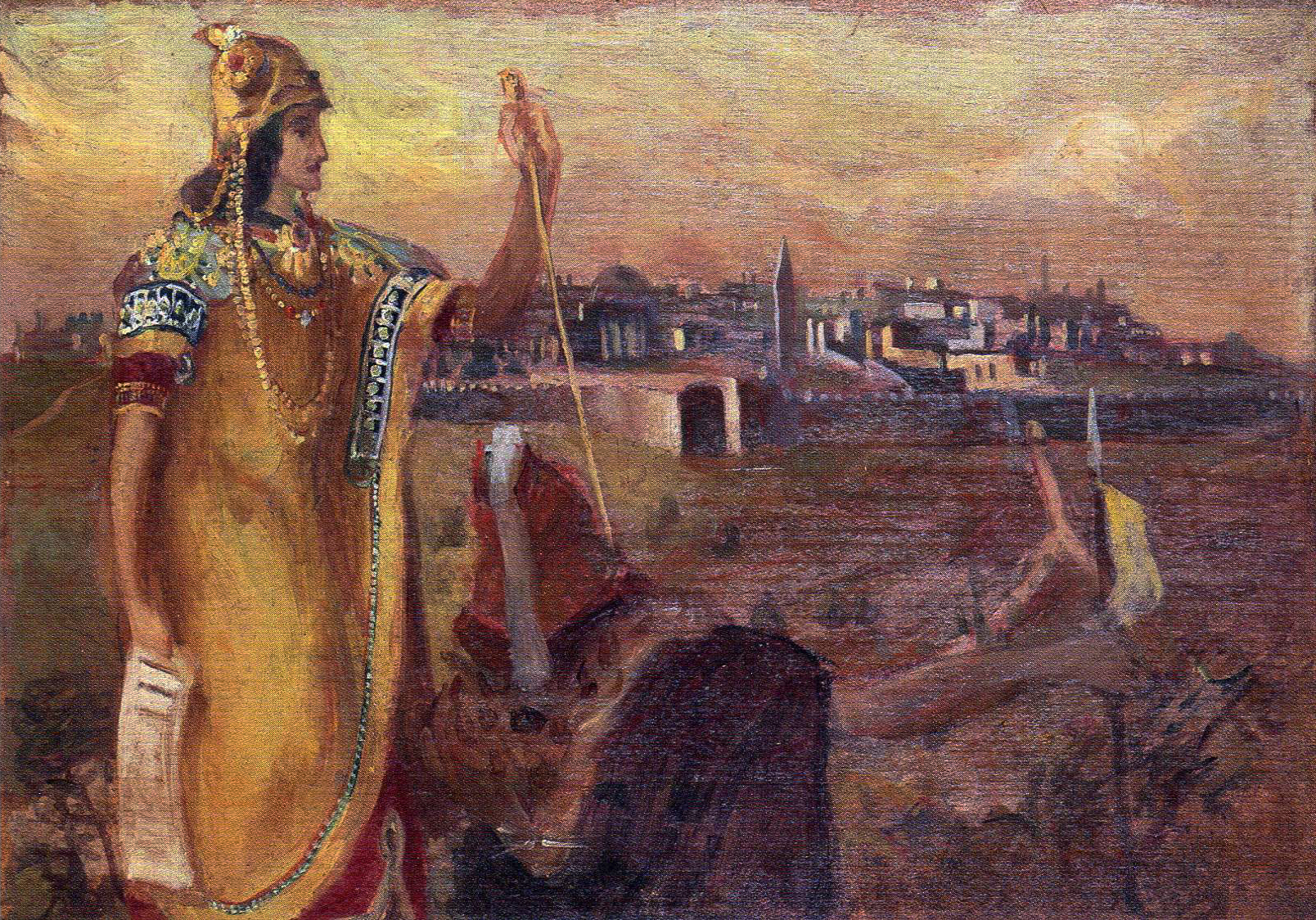
King Solomon and Jerusalem, 1906

Shigeru Aoki (青木 繁, Aoki Shigeru; July 13, 1882 – March 25, 1911) was a Japanese painter, noted for his work in combining Japanese legends and religious subjects with the yōga (Western-style) art movement in late 19th- and early 20th-century Japanese painting. He painted numerous works with themes from Japanese mythology and ancient Indian tales, enchanting the people of the time with rich expressiveness and creativity.

== Biography ==
Aoki was born to an ex-samurai class household in Shojima-machi Kurume of Fukuoka Prefecture, northern Kyūshū, Japan, where his father had been a retainer of the Arima clan daimyō of Kurume Domain.

=== Parallel early life with Hanjiro Sakamoto ===
Aoki was same age and junior highschool friend of Hanjiro Sakamoto who also came to be known as one of the acclaimed Japanese Western-style painters of the 20th century. Aoki and Hanjiro both studied under Miyoshi Mori, an artist who trained in Western-style painting in Kyoto and then returned to Kurume to teach local children. It is known that while studying together in Kurume, Sakamoto considered himself the superior painter. Later on, when Sakamoto became aware of and was surprised by Aoki's development in the capital city, he decided to follow the same institutional path.

=== Leaving home ===
Although Aoki's family strongly disapproved of his interest in art, he left home in 1899 to continue his studies in Tokyo. First Aoki studied with Koyama Shōtarō, who himself was pupil of the Italian foreign advisor Antonio Fontanesi, who had been hired by the Meiji government in the late 1870s to introduce western oil painting to Japan. Later, from 1900 he became a pupil of Kuroda Seiki, then an instructor at the Tōkyō Bijutsu Gakkō (present-day Tokyo National University of Fine Arts and Music).

=== Success ===
In the autumn of 1902, Aoki travelled to Mount Myōgi in Gunma Prefecture and to Nagano Prefecture on a sketching excursion. After his return, he displayed some of his completed works at Kuroda's 8th Hakuba-kai Exhibition, where his use of the techniques of the Pre-Raphaelite Brotherhood combined with themes from the Kojiki resulted in great critical acclaim.

=== A Gift of the Sea ===
Aoki's created one of his best-known artworks, A Gift of the Sea, during a trip to a fishing village in Chiba Prefecture in 1904.

Soon after graduating from university, Aoki, with three of his friends, spent a month and a half in the village. His friend Hanjirō Sakamoto witnessed a scene of fishermen returning with a large catch from the sea. Aoki drew inspiration from Sakamoto's description of the scene for his painting, as well as using his observations of the landscapes and customs of the surrounding area.

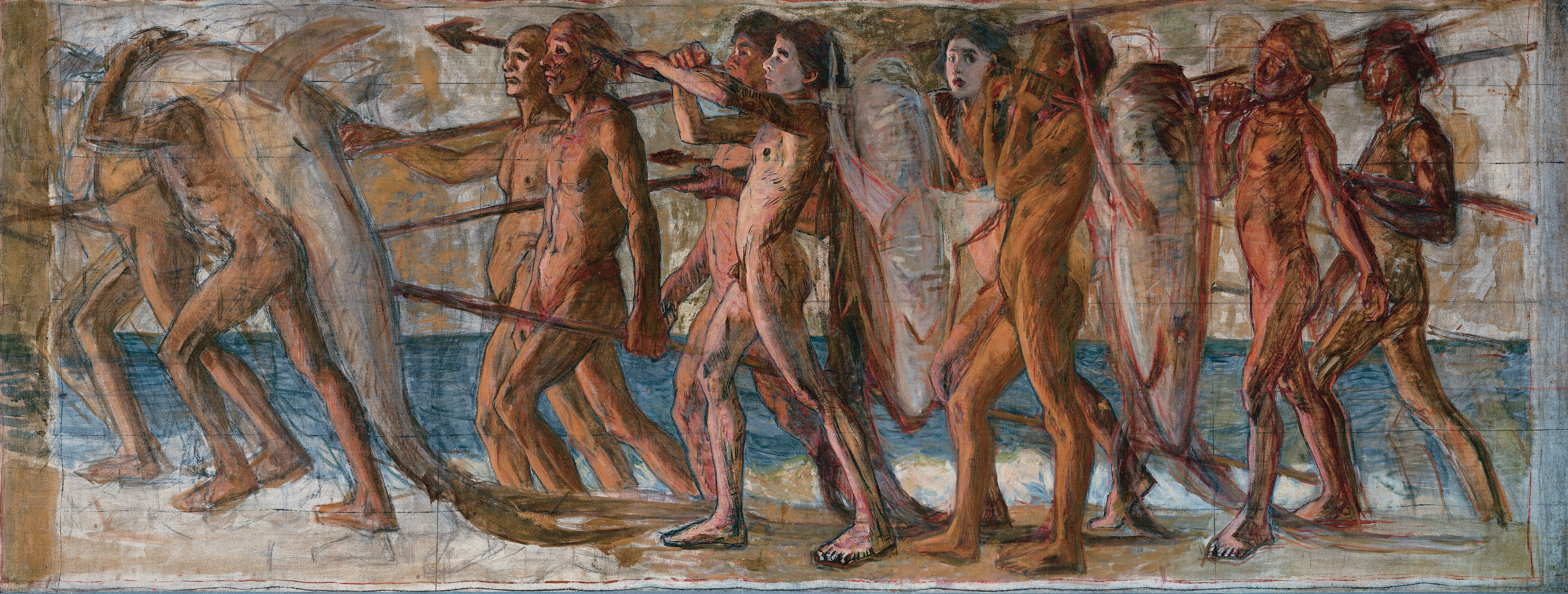
A Gift of the Sea, 1904

The Artizon Museum describes the painting as showing 'imaginative brilliance', 'youthful energy' and 'wild brushwork'.

=== Wandering ===
After his completed university studies and a one and a half months sketching trip to Chiba, he relocated to what is now Chikusei, Ibaraki, where he had a son by his common law wife Tane Fukuda.

However, Fukuda returned home to take care of her ill father in August 1907, and the relationship came to an end. From October 1908, he abandoned his house (in Ibaraki) and went on a prolonged painting trip, creating numerous works, but never settling in any location for an extended period of time.

Shigeru Aoki died of tuberculosis in March 1911 in a Fukuoka City hospital.

== Legacy ==
A number of Aoki's works have been collected by the Ishibashi Museum of Art in his hometown of Kurume, two of which have been recognized by the Japanese government's Agency for Cultural Affairs as Important Cultural Properties.

There are two museums that hold currently the name of Aoki Shigeru: One is the house where he was born and raised in Shojima-maji of Kurume City. The other is the house where A Gift of The Sea was created, in today’s Chiba Prefecture, Tateyama City, Mera village.

== Noted works ==
- Path to the Underworld (黄泉比良坂, Yomotsuhirasaka), 1903, Tokyo University of the Arts
- Tempyo Period (天平時代, Tenpyo-jidai), 1904, Bridgestone Art Museum
- A Gift of the Sea (海の幸, Umi-no-sachi), 1904, Ishibashi Museum of Art, National Important Cultural Property.
- Oanamuchi-no-mikoto (大穴牟知命), 1905, Ishibashi Museum of Art
- Yamato-takeru (日本武尊), 1906, Tokyo National Museum
- Paradise Under the Sea (わだつみのいろこの宮, Wadatsumi no Iroko no Miya), 1907 (Ishibashi Museum of Art), National Important Cultural Property.
