= Yokoyama Taikan Memorial Hall =

- 横山大観記念館
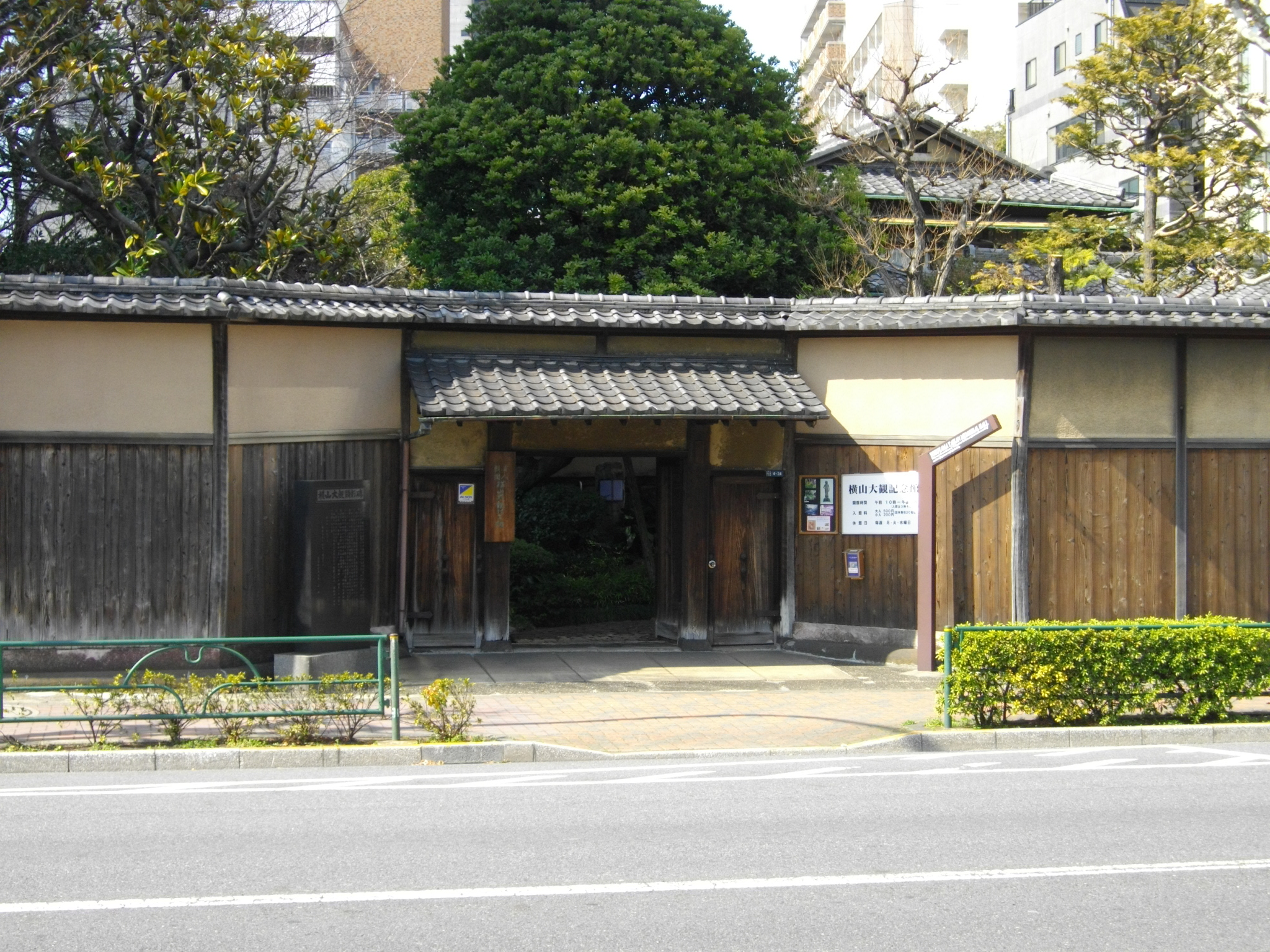
- Yokoyama Taikan Memorial Hall

- Location within Tokyo Yamanote Loop Location within Tokyo wards area
- Established: 1976
- Location: 1-4-24 Ikenohata, Taitō, Tokyo, Japan
- Coordinates: 35°42′44″N 139°46′05″E
- Website: taikan.tokyo
- National Historic Site of Japan National Place of Scenic Beauty of Japan

Yokoyama Taikan Memorial Hall (横山大観記念館, Yokoyama Taikan Kinenkan) is located in the former residence of Nihonga artist Yokoyama Taikan, overlooking Shinobazu Pond in Taitō, Tokyo, Japan. It was opened in 1976 and is operated by a foundation directed by his descendants.

== History ==
Yokoyama Taikan moved to this address in 1909, and constructed a wooden two-story Sukiya-zukuri style house of his own design in 1918. The house served as both his residence and studio. He lived here until the house was destroyed during the Tokyo Air Raid of 1945. It was rebuilt is almost the same style after the war, and he took up residence again in 1954 until his death in 1958. The Japanese gardens at the residence provided inspiration for many of his works. The building was designated a Municipal Historic Site in 1994, and became a National Historic Site and also a Place of Scenic Beauty in 2017.

The collection includes some 1200 objects, including 215 works and studies by the painter, as well as works acquired during the artist's life by other painters, such as Hishida Shunsō and Kanzan Shimomura. Exhibition changes are made every three months.

== See also ==
- List of museums in Tokyo
- Ueno Park
- List of Historic Sites of Japan (Tōkyō)
- List of Places of Scenic Beauty of Japan (Tōkyō)
