= Kanō Sadanobu =

- 狩野 貞信
- Born: 22 May 1597
- Died: 12 November 1623 (aged 26)
- Known for: Painting
- Movement: Kanō school

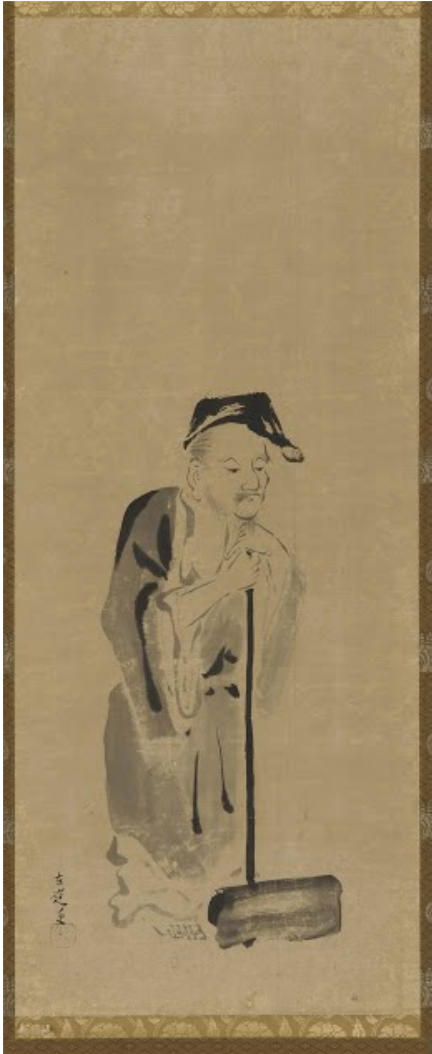
Shide (Jittoku) from Freer Museum

Kanō Sadanobu (狩野 貞信, 22 May 1597 – 12 November 1623) was a Japanese painter of the Kanō school. He was the son of the Kanō Mitsunobu, who lost a great deal of the main Kanō school's patronage and prestige. Sadanobu was Mitsunobu's only son and seventh head of the Kanō house descending directly from founded Kanō Masanobu.

It was the intention of Mitsunobu's brother, Kanō Takanobu, to have his son, Kanō Tan'yū, remain in Kyoto as designated heir to his father's sub-branch of the Kano school workshop. However, Tan'yū accepted the title of goyō eshi in 1617 and began to plan his atelier in Edo, most likely with the Tokugawa shōgun's approval. This moved Tan'yū's younger brother, Kanō Naonobu, up as to succeed the family workshop in Kyoto upon Takanobu's death. However, in 1630 the city of Edo was flourishing and Naonobu was also made goyō eshi and given his own parcel of land at Takegawachō in Edo, where he then built his residence and studio. The main Kanō-school workshop, led by Sandanobu by this time, remained in Kyoto, either by instruction of the shōgun or Sandanbou's own will. However, he had no brothers or children he could designate as heir by the time of his death in 1623.

As a result of Sadanobu leaving no heir, the Kyoto workshop fell into the hands of another Kanō Takanobu child, Kanō Yasunobu. Although Yasunobu was adopted into the main Kyoto house upon Sadanobu's death, sometime during 1624–1643 he too was appointed goyō eshi by Tokugawa and moved to Edo to build his workshop known as Nakabashi. However, Yasunobu did not give up his claim to headship of the main house in order to make his move and still considered his branch the main Kanō house.

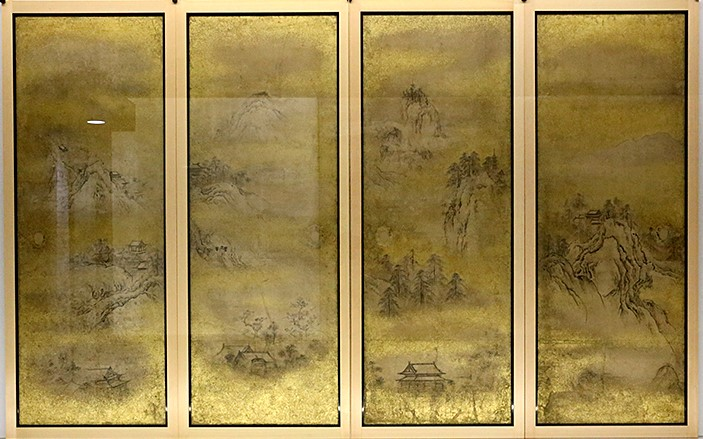
Questionable ownership
