= Kanō Yasunobu =

Japanese painter

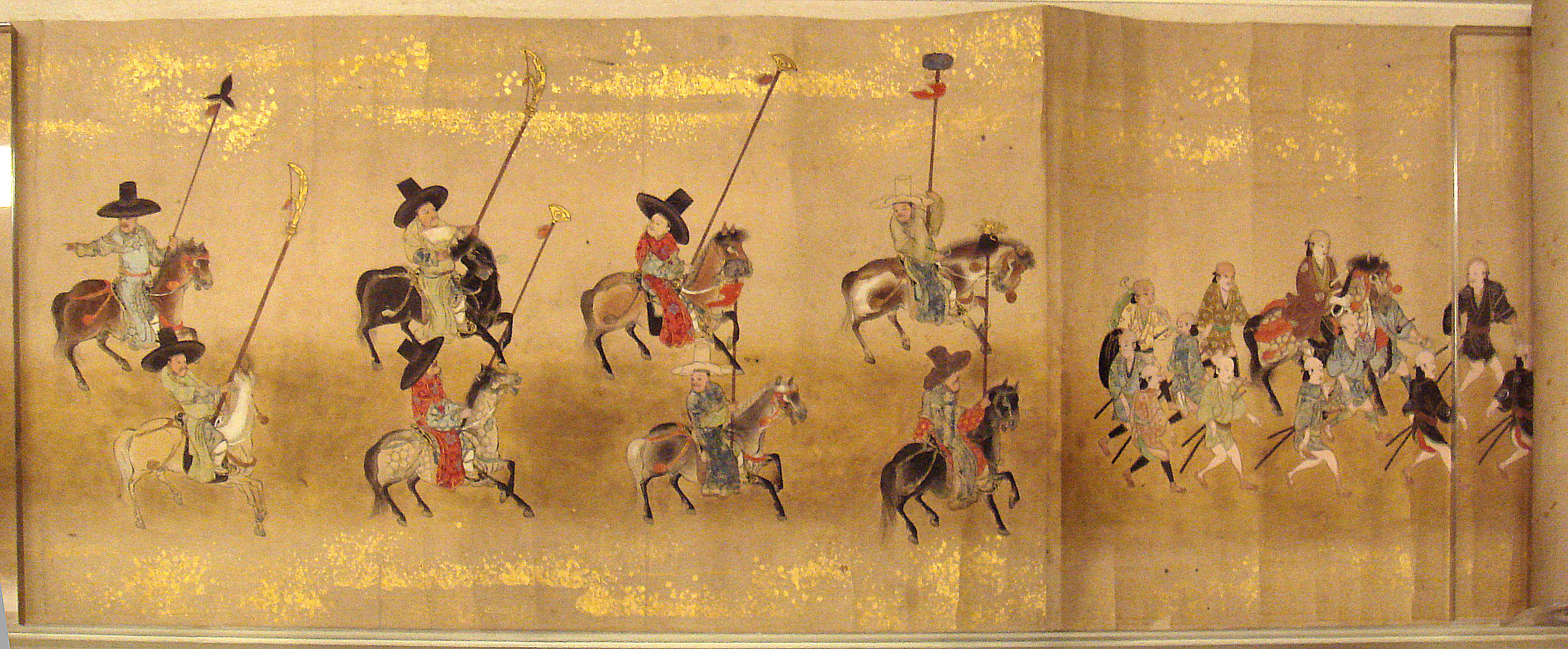
Korean Embassy to Japan, handscroll painting, 1655 (British Museum)

Kanō Yasunobu (狩野 安信, 10 January 1614 – 1 October 1685) was a Japanese painter of the Kanō school of painting during the Edo period. He was the third son of Kanō Takanobu, who had been head of the school, and succeeded Kanō Sadanobu as head of the Kyoto branch in 1623 until he joined his brothers in . Yasunobu was the youngest brother of Kanō Tan'yū, one of the most prominent painters of the Kanō school. His best remembered work is the Gadō Yōketsu, a Kanō school history and training manual. He also worked under the art names Eishin (永真) and Bokushinsai (牧心斎).

== Life and career ==
Kanō Yasunobu was born in Kyoto on the 1st day of the 12th month of the 18th year of Keichō (10 January 1614). His father was Kanō Takanobu (1571–1618) whose two elder sons Tan'yū and Naonobu moved to Edo (modern Tokyo) to become goyō eshi, an exclusive position painting for the Tokugawa shogunate. The Kyoto line continued after Takanobu's death in 1618 under Kanō Mitsunobu's son Sadanobu, who adopted Yasunobu as he had no heir. Yasunobu succeeded him as head of the Kyoto Kanō in 1623. Yasunobu thus continued the Kyoto line until he also was made goyō eshi and moved to Edo, though he maintained his claim as head of the Kyoto branch.

Yasunobu was a dedicated scholar and painter, but his skill is considered inferior to that of his brothers. His was a studied technique learned through faithful copying of masters' models. His colour work was in the idiom of Tan'yū, and his ink wash painting had a realistic vigour. His most important work was not his painting but the Gadō Yōketsu (画道要訣, "The Secret Way of Painting", 1680), a training manual for Kanō painters and hagiography of the school. Before this book's publication, Kanō techniques were passed down orally from master to apprentice, and there was disunity in the teaching methods of the school's branches.

Yasunobu died in Edo on the 4th day of the 9th month of the 2nd year of Jōkyō (1 October 1685). He also worked under the art names Eishin (永真) and Bokushinsai (牧心斎).

Works by Kanō Yasunobu

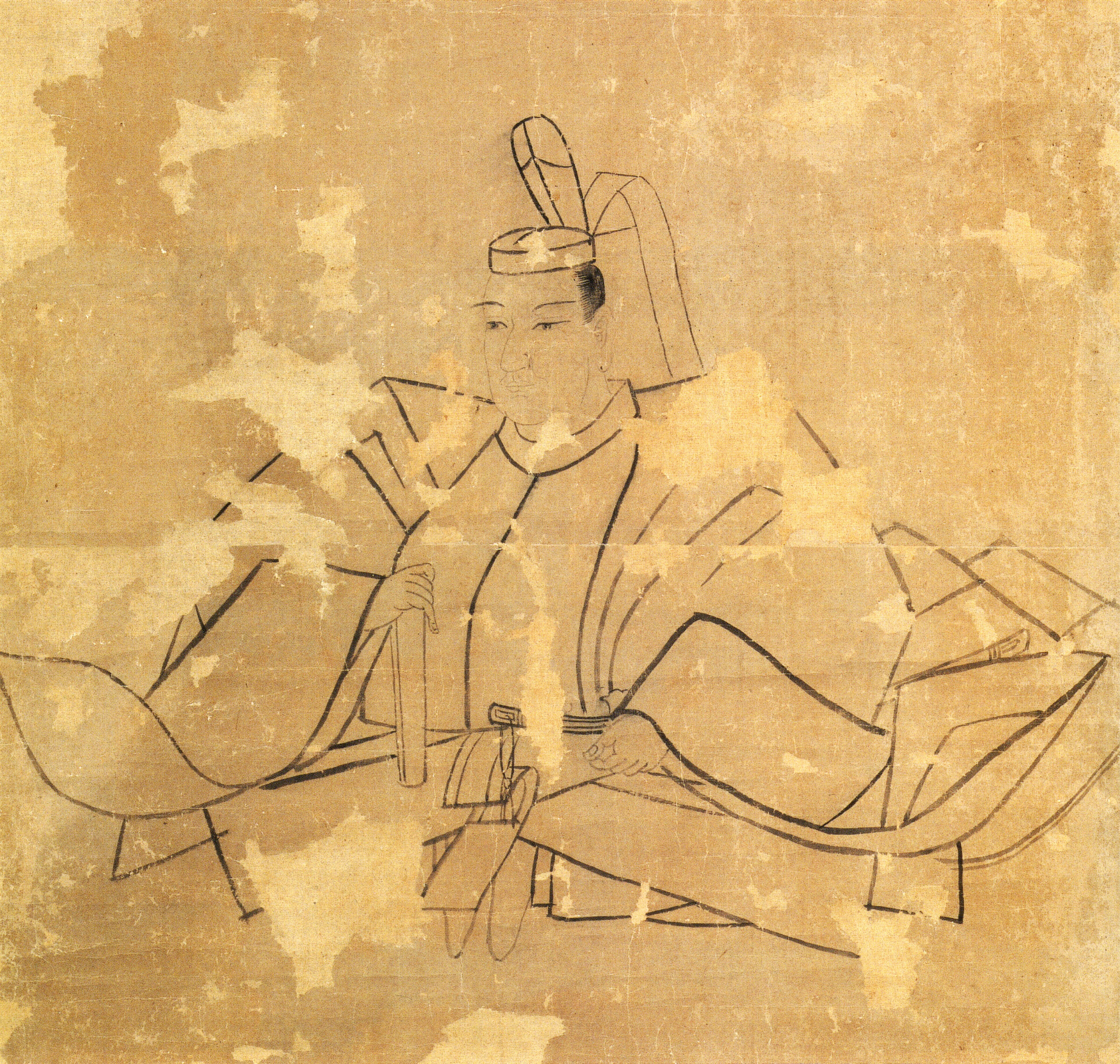

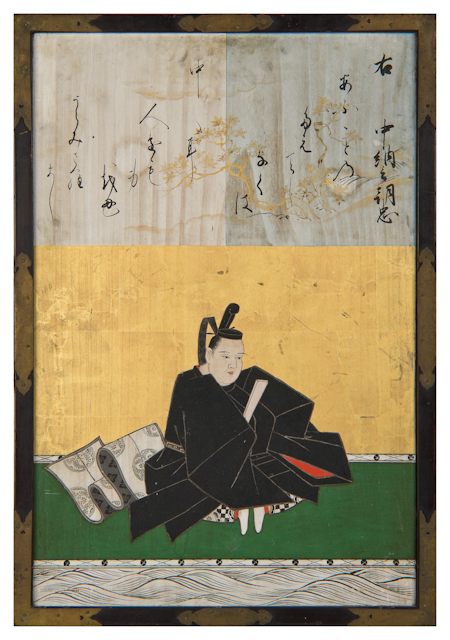

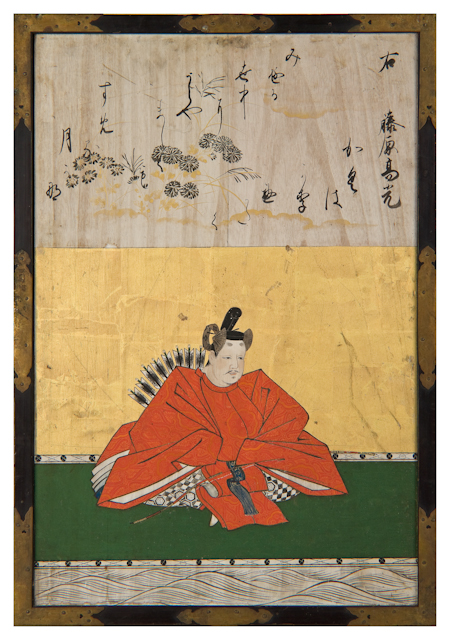

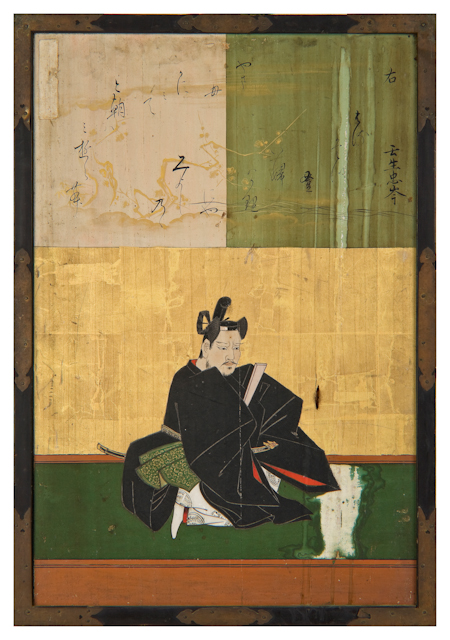

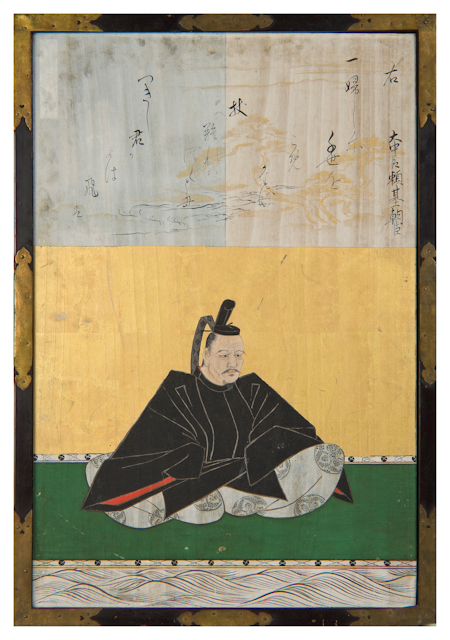

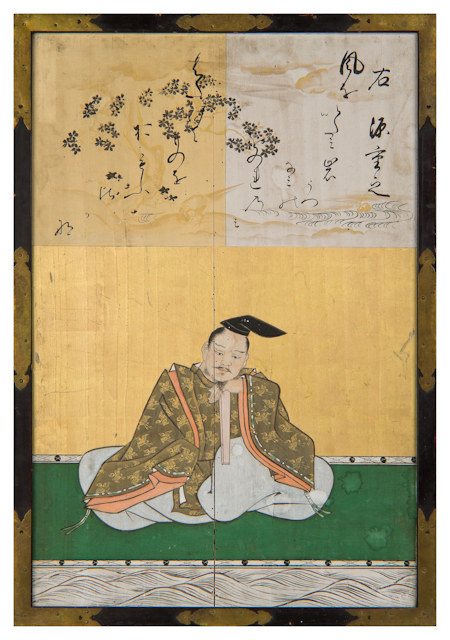

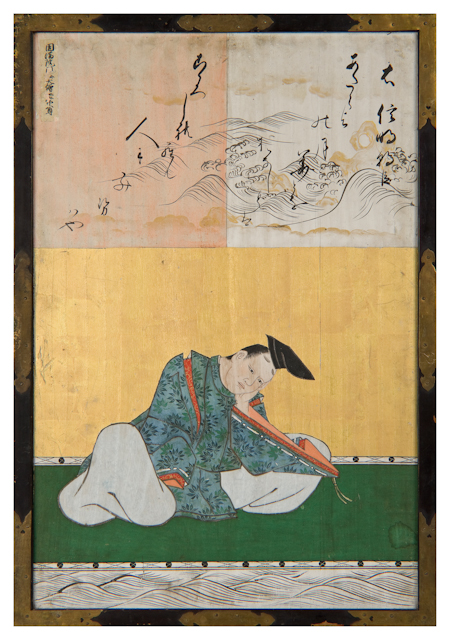

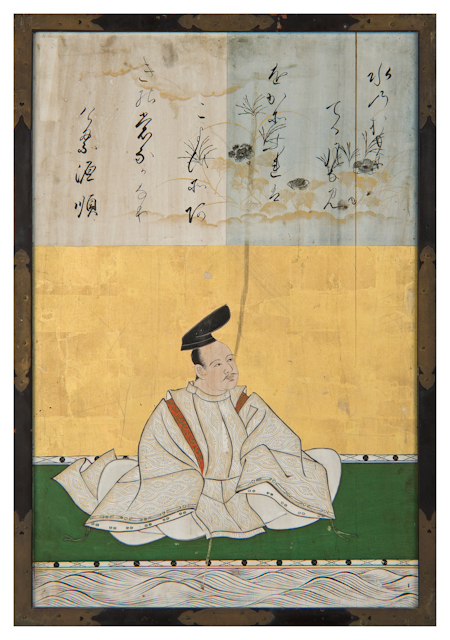

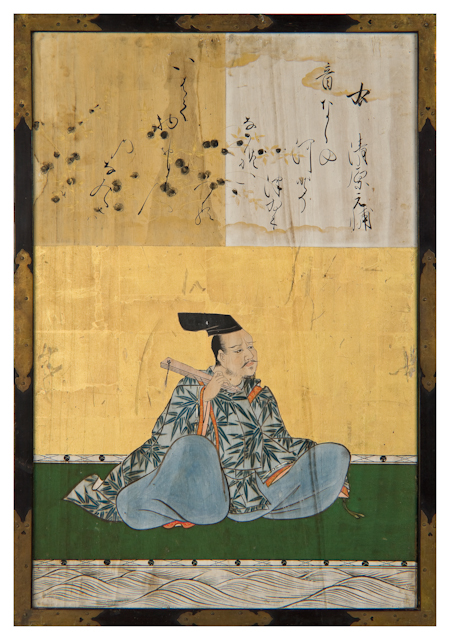

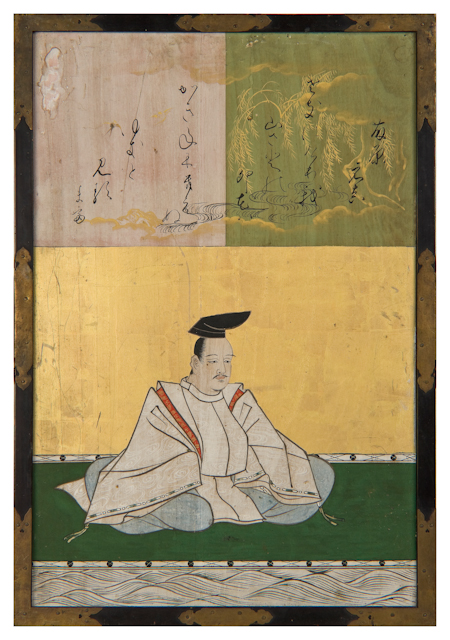

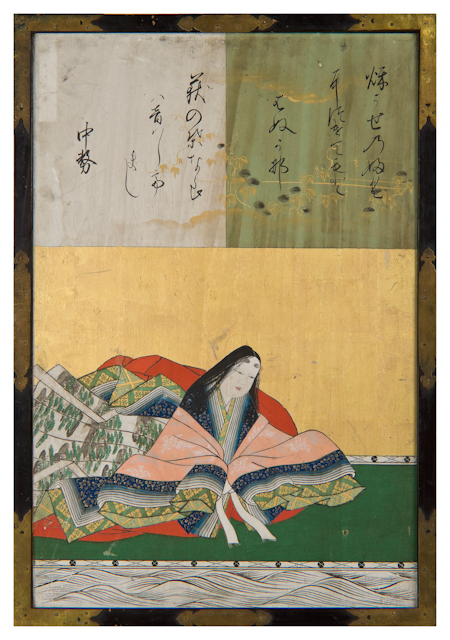

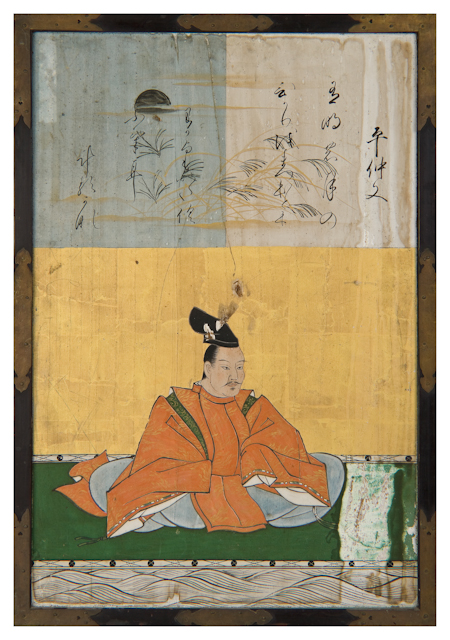

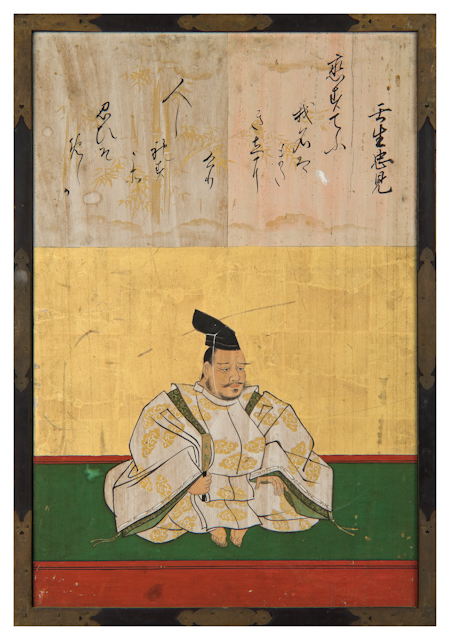

== Works cited ==
- Addiss, Stephen; Groemer, Gerald; Rimer, J. Thomas (2006). Traditional Japanese Arts And Culture: An Illustrated Sourcebook. University of Hawaii Press. ISBN 978-0-8248-2878-3.
- Gerhart, Karen M. (2003). "Talent, Training, and Power: The Kano Painting Workshop in the Seventeenth Century". In Brenda G., Jordan; Virginia, Weston (eds.). Copying the Master and Stealing His Secrets. University of Hawai'i Press. pp. 9–30. ISBN 9780824862008 – via Project MUSE.
- Jordan, Brenda G. (2003). Copying the Master and Stealing His Secrets: Talent and Training in Japanese Painting. University of Hawaii Press. ISBN 978-0-8248-2608-6.
- Yamashita, Yūji (2004). Kanō-ha ketteiban 狩野派決定版. Bessatsu Taiyō (in Japanese). Heibonsha. ISBN 978-4-58292131-1. OCLC 64782262.
- Yasumura, Toshinobu (2006). Motto Shiritai Kanō-ha: Tan'yū to Edo Kanō-ha もっと知りたい狩野派: 探幽と江戸狩野派. Tokyo Bijutsu. ISBN 978-4-8087-0815-3.
