= Kanō Takanobu =

Japanese painter (1571–1618)

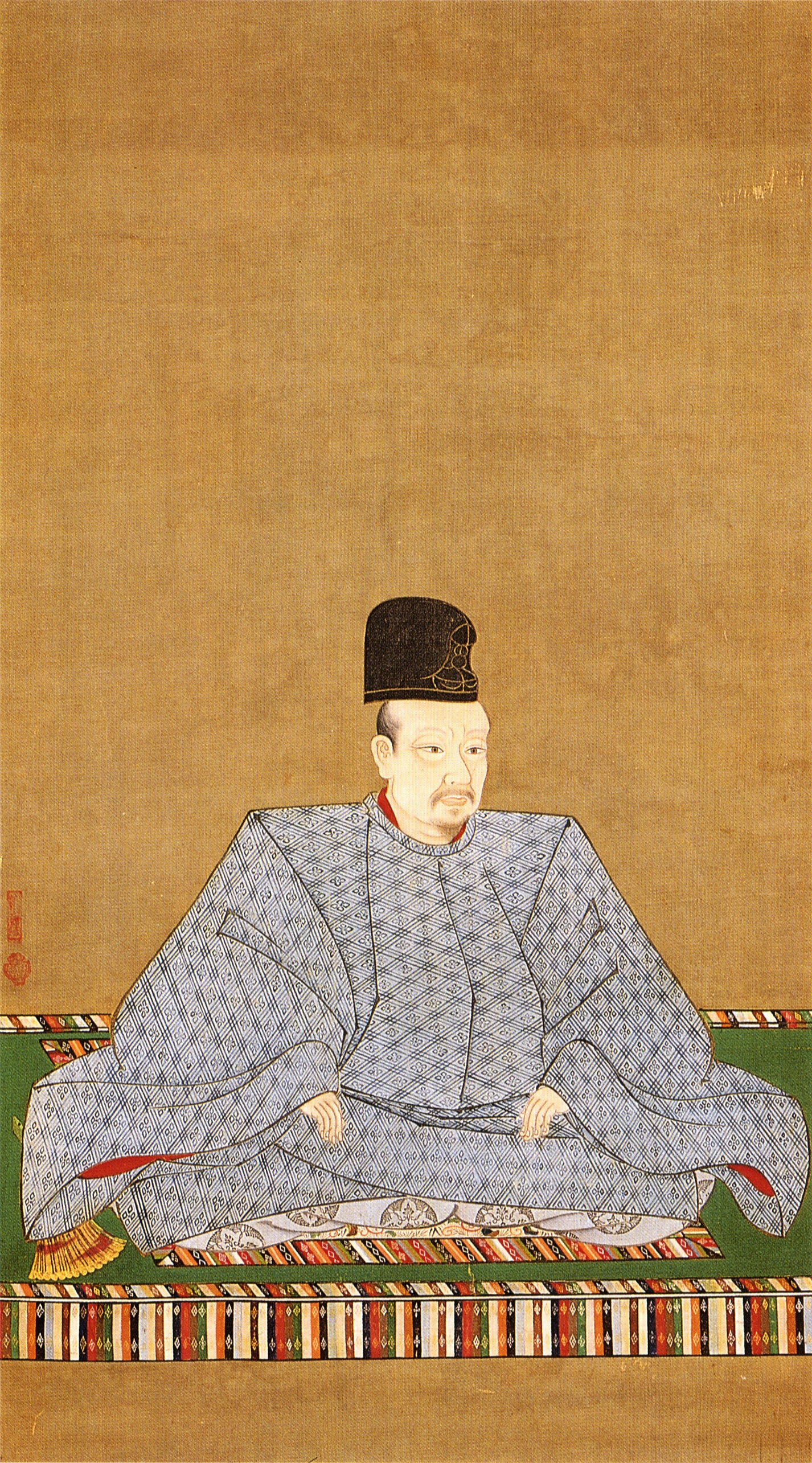
Portrait of Emperor Go-Yōzei, c. 1610s, colour on silk, 107.2 x 60.2 cm

Kanō Takanobu (狩野 孝信, 1 December 1571 – 18 October 1618) was a Japanese painter of the Kanō school of painting during the Azuchi–Momoyama period (1573–1615). He was the father of Kanō Tan'yū, one of the most prominent painters of the school.

== Life and career ==
Takanobu was born in Kyoto on the 25th day of the 11th month of the 2nd year of Genki. He was the youngest son of the Kanō school head painter Kanō Eitoku (1543–90) and younger brother of Kanō Mitsunobu.

When Kanō Naganobu (1577–1654)—Eitoku's brother—moved at the behest of the recently ascendent Tokugawa shogunate to its new administrative capital of Edo (modern Tokyo) around 1610–15, Takanobu remained in Kyoto, where the commissions he received indicate he was a favourite of the court. At the time only Takanobu and Naganobu had sufficient skill to head branches of the school.

With financial backing from the Tokugawa shogunate, Takanobu conceived and oversaw the painting to be done for the new palace of Emperor Go-Mizunoo, work which was finished in 1614 with Takanobu applying the final touches to many of the sliding panels there and in surrounding buildings. The twenty panels depicting thirty-two Chinese sages in the throne room of the shishin-den are attributed to Takanobu. These panels are some of the few works of Takanobu to have survived, and are the oldest surviving paintings from the shishin-den.

In 1617 Naganobu's eldest son Tan'yū was called to Edo and made a goyō eshi, an exclusive position painting for the shogunate. Another son, Kanō Naonobu (1607–50), succeeded as head of the Kyoto branch upon Takanobu's death in 1618, though he too moved to Edo in 1630. The line continued under Mitsunobu's son Sadanobu, who died without an heir in 1623 but had adopted Takanobu's youngest son Yasunobu, who thus continued the Kyoto line until he also was made goyō eshi and moved to Edo, though he maintained his claim as head of the Kyoto branch.

Works by Kanō Takanobu

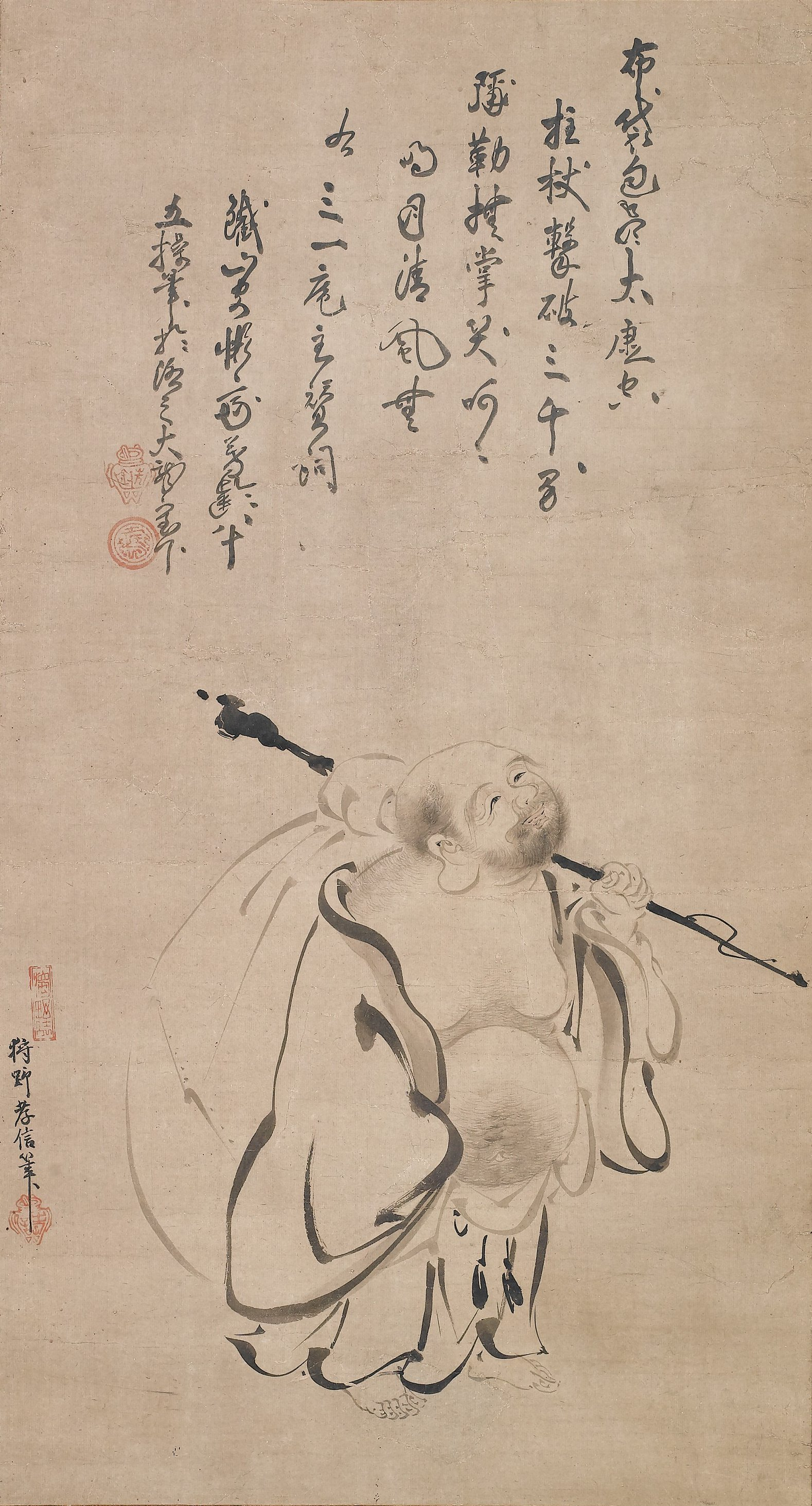
Hotei, 1616

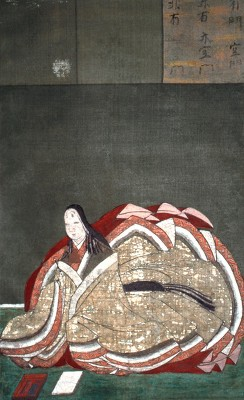
Portrait of Murasaki Shikibu

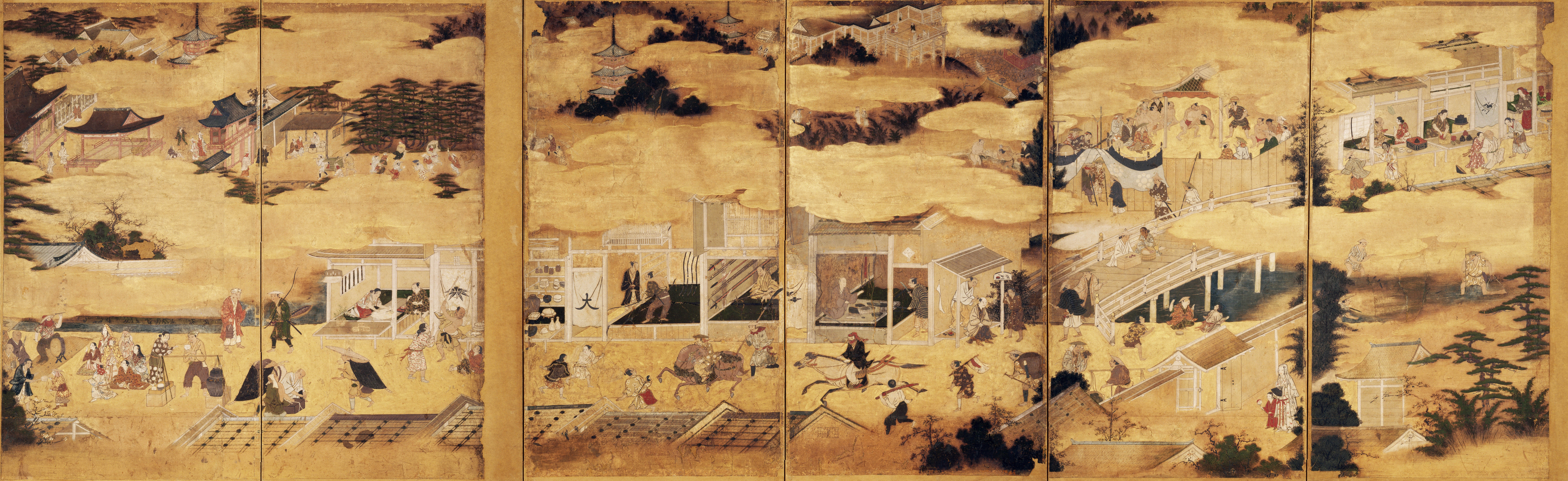
Rakuchu Rakugai-zu, byōbu folding screen, Azuchi–Momoyama period

== Works cited ==
- Gerhart, Karen M. (2003). "Talent, Training, and Power: The Kano Painting Workshop in the Seventeenth Century". In Jordan, Brenda G.; Weston, Virginia (eds.). Copying the Master and Stealing His Secrets. University of Hawai'i Press. pp. 9–30. ISBN 9780824862008 – via Project MUSE.
- Lillehoj, Elizabeth (2011). Art and Palace Politics in Early Modern Japan, 1580s–1680s. Brill Publishers. ISBN 978-90-04-20612-0.
- Yamashita, Yūji (2004). Kanō-ha ketteiban 狩野派決定版. Bessatsu Taiyō (in Japanese). Heibonsha. ISBN 978-4-58292131-1. OCLC 64782262.
- Yasumura, Toshinobu (2006). Motto Shiritai Kanō-ha: Tan'yū to Edo Kanō-ha もっと知りたい狩野派: 探幽と江戸狩野派. Tokyo Bijutsu. ISBN 978-4-8087-0815-3.
