= List of works exhibited at the National Treasure Gallery =

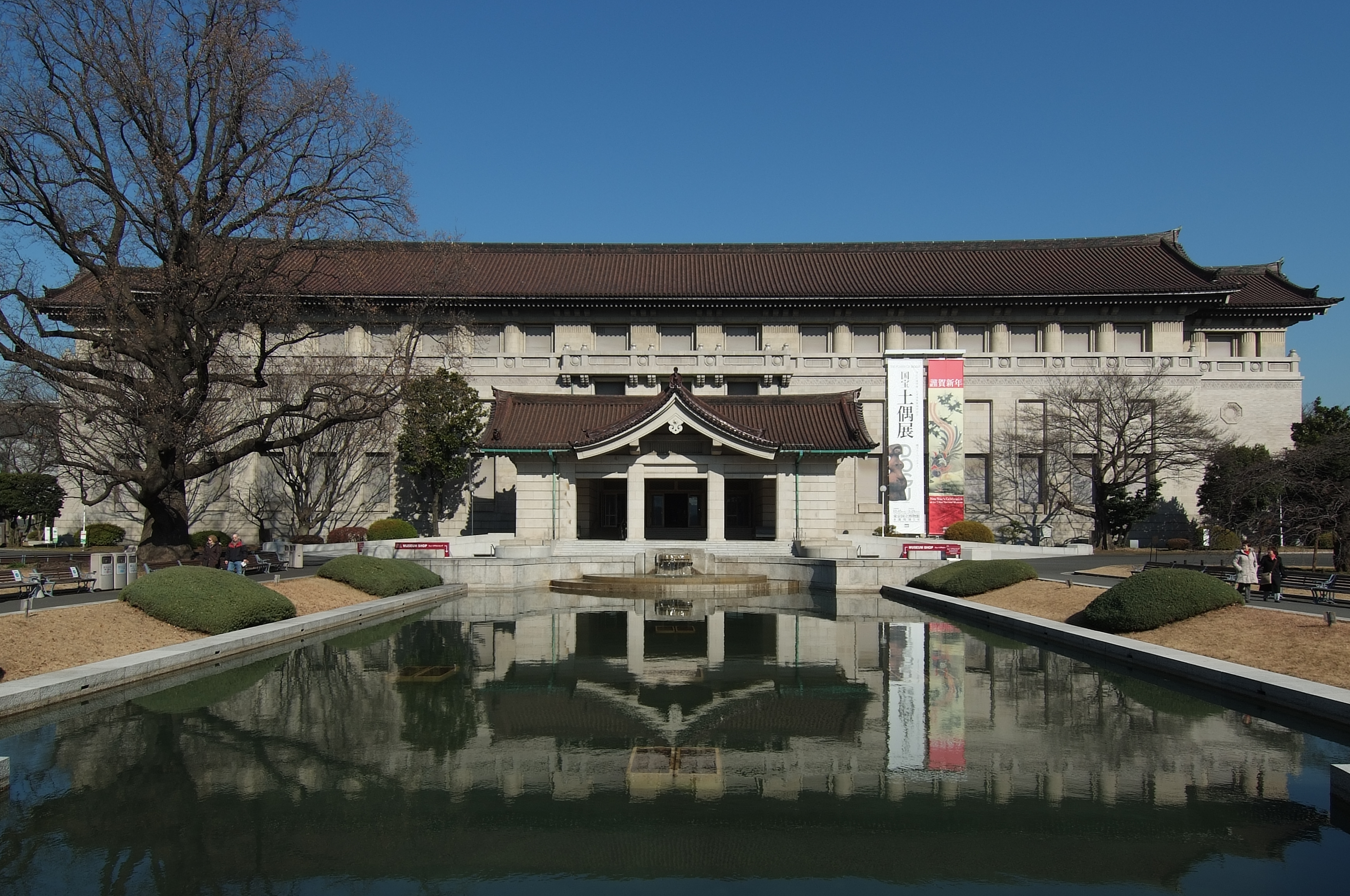
Honkan (Japanese Gallery) of the Tokyo National Museum, where the National Treasure Gallery is located.

This is a list of the paintings and works of calligraphy exhibited at the National Treasure Gallery in the Tokyo National Museum.

The National Treasure Gallery is located in Room 2 of the Honkan (Japanese Gallery), and like the name indicates it is dedicated to the display of items designated as National Treasures of Japan.

At least one National Treasure is on exhibit at any given moment, changing approximately every month.

== Works exhibited ==
=== 2020 ===
On exhibit	Item	Date	Comments	Image	Ref.
January 2 to 13	Pine Trees	16th century	Tokyo National Museum		

=== 2019 ===
On exhibit	Item	Date	Comments	Image	Ref.
November 26 to December 25	Lotus Sutra, Myoshogon'o honji hon chapter	13th century	1 out of 33 handscrolls, ink on paper decorated with gold and silver dust and foil. Lent by Jikō-ji, Saitama.		
October 29 to November 24	Gunsho chiyo (Qunshu zhiyao), Vol. 26	11th century	Tokyo National Museum; Kujō family		
October 10 to 27	Sixteen Arhats; 7th and 10th arhat	11th century	Tokyo National Museum; Formerly owned by Shojuraigoji Temple, Shiga.		
September 3 to 29	Jeweled Pagoda Mandala, Vols 1 and 4, Sovereign Kings of the Golden Light Sutra written in gold to form the pagoda	12th century	Lent by Daichoju-in and Ochoju-in, Iwate		
August 6 to September 1	The Six Realms: The Animal Realm and The Asura Realm	13th century	Tokyo National Museum; Lent by Shojuraigoji Temple, Shiga.		
July 9 to August 4	Gaki zoshi (Scroll of hungry ghosts)	12th century	Tokyo National Museum		
June 4 to July 7	Engishiki Vol 12 and Vol 16	11th century	Tokyo National Museum		
May 14 to June 6	Senju Kannon (Sahasrabhuja)	17th century	Tokyo National Museum; ex. Kawasaki Family		
April 9 to May 12	List of Ritual Objects for Esoteric Buddhism Brought from China by Priest Saicho	17th century	Lent by Enryakuji, Shiga		
March 12 to April 7	Merrymaking Under Blossom Trees by Kano Naganobu	17th century	Tokyo National Museum		
February 13 to March 10	Amida (Amitabha) Coming over the Mountain	13th century	Eikan-dō Zenrin-ji		
January 16 to February 11	Engishiki Kujo Edition	11th century	Tokyo National Museum		
January 2 to 14	Pine Trees	16th century	Tokyo National Museum		

=== 2018 ===
On exhibit	Item	Date	Comments	Image	Ref.
November 27 to December 9	Patriarch of the Tendai School Zenmui (Subhakarasimha)	11th century	Ichijo-ji, Hyogo		
October 30 to November 25	Hokan shu, Volume 2	1186	Kongobu-ji, Wakayama		
October 2 to 28	Kokuzo Bosatsu (Akasagarbha)	12th century	Tokyo National Museum; Formerly owned by Mitsui Gomei Co.		
September 4 to 30	Sixteen Arhats: First Arhat, Fifth Arha	11th century	Tokyo National Museum; Formerly owned by Shojuraigoji Temple, Shiga.		
August 7 to September 2	Documents Relating to Ordination of Priest Denkyo Daishi	9th century	Tokyo National Museum; Raigō-in, Kyoto (来迎院)		
July 10 to August 8	Gunsho chiyo (Qunshu zhiyao), Vol. 31	11th century	Tokyo National Museum; Kujō family		
June 5 to July 8	Wakatai Jisshu (Treatise on Poetry)	11th century	Tokyo National Museum		
May 15 to June 3	Landscape screen	13th century	Six-section folding screen (byōbu). Lent by Jingo-ji, Kyoto.		
April 10 to May 13	Lotus Sutra or "Kunōji Sutra, Hoben bon chapter	12th century	Handscrolls, ink on decorated paper by the Fujiwara clan. Lent by Tesshū-ji, Shizuoka.		
March 13 to April 8	Merrymaking under Blossom Trees	17th century	One pair of six-section folding screens (byōbu) by Kanō Naganobu.		
January 30 to March 11	Segment of the Sutra of the Wise and Foolish	8th century	One handscroll, ink on paper. Attributed to Emperor Shōmu.		
January 2 to 28	Shaka rising from the Gold Coffin	11th century	Hanging scroll, color on silk. Lent by the Kyoto National Museum.		

=== 2017 ===
On exhibit	Item	Date	Comments	Image	Ref.
November 21 to December 25	Man'yōshū, Genryaku edition, Vols. 7 and 19	11th century	2 of 20 books bound by fukuro-toji, ink on decorated paper.		
October 24 to November 19	Sixteen Arhats, Eighth Arhat and Twelfth Arhat	11th century	2 of a set of 16 hanging scrolls, color on silk.		
September 26 to October 22	Lotus Sutra, Myoshogon'o honji hon chapter	13th century	1 out of 33 handscrolls, ink on paper decorated with gold and silver dust and foil. Lent by Jikō-ji, Saitama.		
August 29 to September 24	Illustrated Biography of the Priest Ippen: Volume 7	1299	Hand scroll (emakimono), color on silk.		
August 1 to 27	Engishiki, Kujō edition, Vol. 4, Written on the reverse side of another document	11th century	Part of 27 scrolls, ink on paper.		
July 4 to 30	Illustrated Biography of the Founders of the Kegon Sect: Chapter on Gangyo (Wonhyo), Vol. 2	13th century	Six hand scrolls (emakimono), color on paper. Lent by Kōzan-ji, Kyoto.		
June 6 to July 2	Documents related to the priest Enchin.	850	Eight rolled scrolls, ink on paper.		
May 9 to June 4	Lotus Sutra, Vol. 1	11th century	Part of ten handscrolls, ink on decorative paper with five-colored design. Lent by Sensō-ji, Tokyo.		
April 11 to May 7	Jeweled Pagoda Mandala	12th century	Jeweled Pagoda Mandala, Sovereign Kings of the Golden Light Sutra written in gold to form the pagoda. Lent by Chūson-ji, Iwate		
March 14 to April 9	Merrymaking under Blossom Trees	17th century	One pair of six-section folding screens (byōbu) by Kanō Naganobu.		
