= Kanō Naonobu =

Japanese painter (1607–1650)

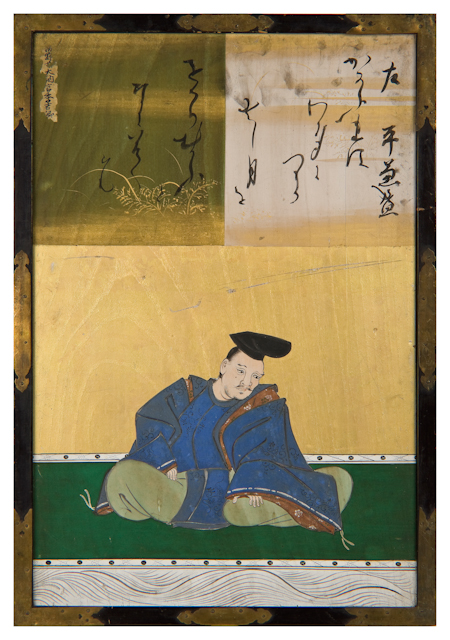
Taira no Kanemori, 1648, from the Thirty-Six Immortals of Poetry

Kanō Naonobu (狩野 尚信, 25 November 1607 – 7 May 1650) was a Japanese painter of the Kanō school of painting during the early Edo period. He was the younger brother of Kanō Tan'yū, with whom he completed a number of prominent commissions for the Tokugawa shogunate. His style differed somewhat from Tan'yū's in his bold use of negative space and his mastery of ink wash painting. Naonobu also used the art name Jitekisai (自適斎).

== Life and career ==
Naonobu was born in Kyoto on the 6th day of the 10th month of the 12th year of Keichō (25 November 1607). He was the second son of the Kanō school painter Kanō Takanobu and the younger brother of Kanō Tan'yū, who was to continue the line and become one of the foremost painters of the school.

The Tokugawa shogunate invited Naonobu to the administrative capital Edo (modern Tokyo) in 1630, where he established himself at the Takekawa workshop affiliated with the Kanō school and became a goyō eshi, an exclusive position painting for the shogunate. He studied under his brother Tan'yū and a lesser known Kanō artist, Kanō Kō-i (d. 1625). The two completed a number of prominent commissions for the shogunate.

Naonobu's skills differed somewhat from Tan'yū's, particularly taking after his mentor Kanō Kō-i and delving into ink wash painting and his bold use of negative space. His work had a more Japanese feel deriving from nativist Yamato-e traditions. On gilt sliding doors and partitions he tended to suggest the form of the subject rather than delineate it. Works such as the Fujimi saigyō-zu byōbu screen show his interest in contrasts, depicting an enormous, barely-delineated Mount Fuji against a background of mostly negative space with a tiny seated figure gazing up at it.

In his personal life Naonobu had the nickname Shume (主馬). He enjoyed trips to Kyoto and visiting the artist and aristocrat Kobori Masakazu. Naonobu went missing on the 7th day of the 4th month of the 3rd year of Keian (7 May 1650). He was said to have died of illness, though rumours circulated that he had drowned while fishing or had set off for China.

Folding screen paintings by Kanō Naonobu

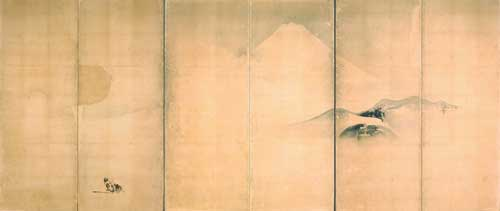
Fujimi saigyō-zu byōbu, ink on paper, 155.8 cm × 363.4 cm

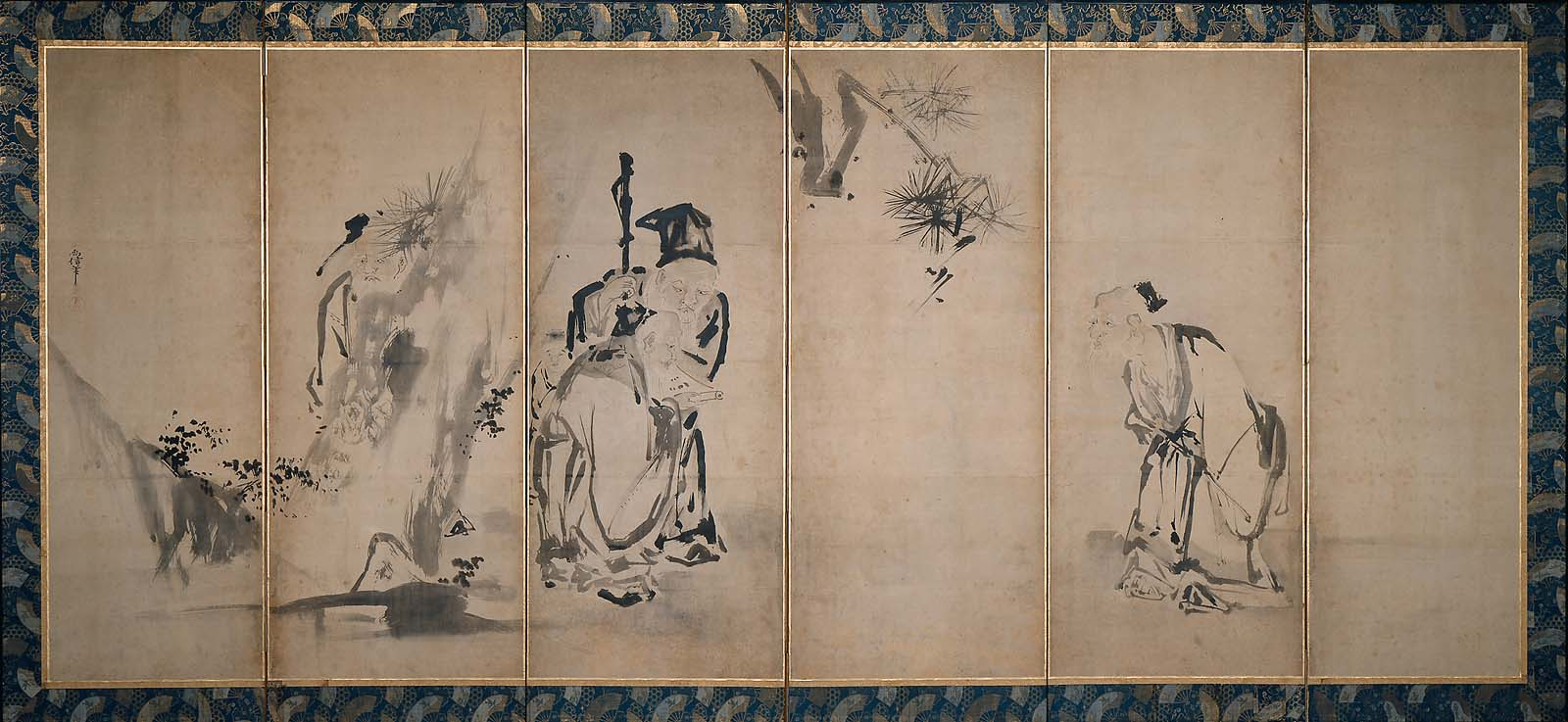
One of a pair of byōbu depicting The Four Sages of Mount Shang (商山四皓).
