= Kanō Naganobu =

Japanese painter (1577–1654)

Merry-making under Aronia Blossoms, left half of a byōbu folding screen, 17th century

Kanō Naganobu (狩野長信, 1577 – 26 December 1654) (Note: Or the 18th day of the 11th month of the 3rd year of the Jōō period, according to the traditional Japanese calendar) was a Japanese painter of the Kanō school.

Naganobu was the youngest brother of the Kanō school's head, Kanō Eitoku. Naganobu completed numerous commissions for the court in Kyoto, including at the Imperial Palace, and started his own line of the Kanō school. He was the first major Kanō painter to move from Kyoto to Edo (modern Tokyo) as the Tokugawa shogunate consolidated control of the country and set up its government there. Naganobu is speculated to have made the move before Tokugawa Ieyasu's death in 1615, possibly as early as 1605, and may have worked first at Ieyasu's castle in Sunpu Domain (in modern Shizuoka). His workshop in Edo officially served the Tokugawa shogunate under the title goyō eshi (御用絵師).

== Notes ==
Naganobu, Kano, 1775-1828

== Works cited ==
- Jordan, Brenda G. (2003). Copying the Master and Stealing His Secrets: Talent and Training in Japanese Painting. University of Hawaii Press. ISBN 978-0-8248-2608-6.
- Yamashita, Yūji (2004). Kanō-ha ketteiban 狩野派決定版. Bessatsu Taiyō. Heibonsha. ISBN 978-4-58292131-1. OCLC 64782262.
