= Kanō Mitsunobu =

Kanō Mitsunobu (狩野 光信, 1565–1608) was a son of Kanō Eitoku and an influential artist of the Kanō school of Japanese painting.

== Biography ==
Scholars disagree on the year of Mitsunobu's birth, placing it in either 1561 or 1565. The earliest record of his involvement on any major project was in conjunction with his father's commission to paint elements of Oda Nobunaga's Azuchi Castle. He also worked with his father on a number of other major castles and palaces, including Osaka Castle, Kyoto Gosho, and Toyotomi Hideyoshi's Jurakudai palace.

He received a commission from Toyotomi Hideyori to paint the ceiling of the main hall of Shōkoku-ji in Kyoto with dragons.

After his father's death in 1590, Mitsunobu became the head of the family and of the school. He took over the Kyoto Imperial Palace project, and continued to receive many illustrious commissions. However, in part due to his poor leadership skills and political ability, he lost many commissions and patrons to the rival Hasegawa school of painting and siblings within the Kanō school. Notably, his adopted brother, Kanō Sanraku, and his son, Kanō Sansetsu, saw a surge of new commissions and helped cement their place within Kanō school history.

== Style ==
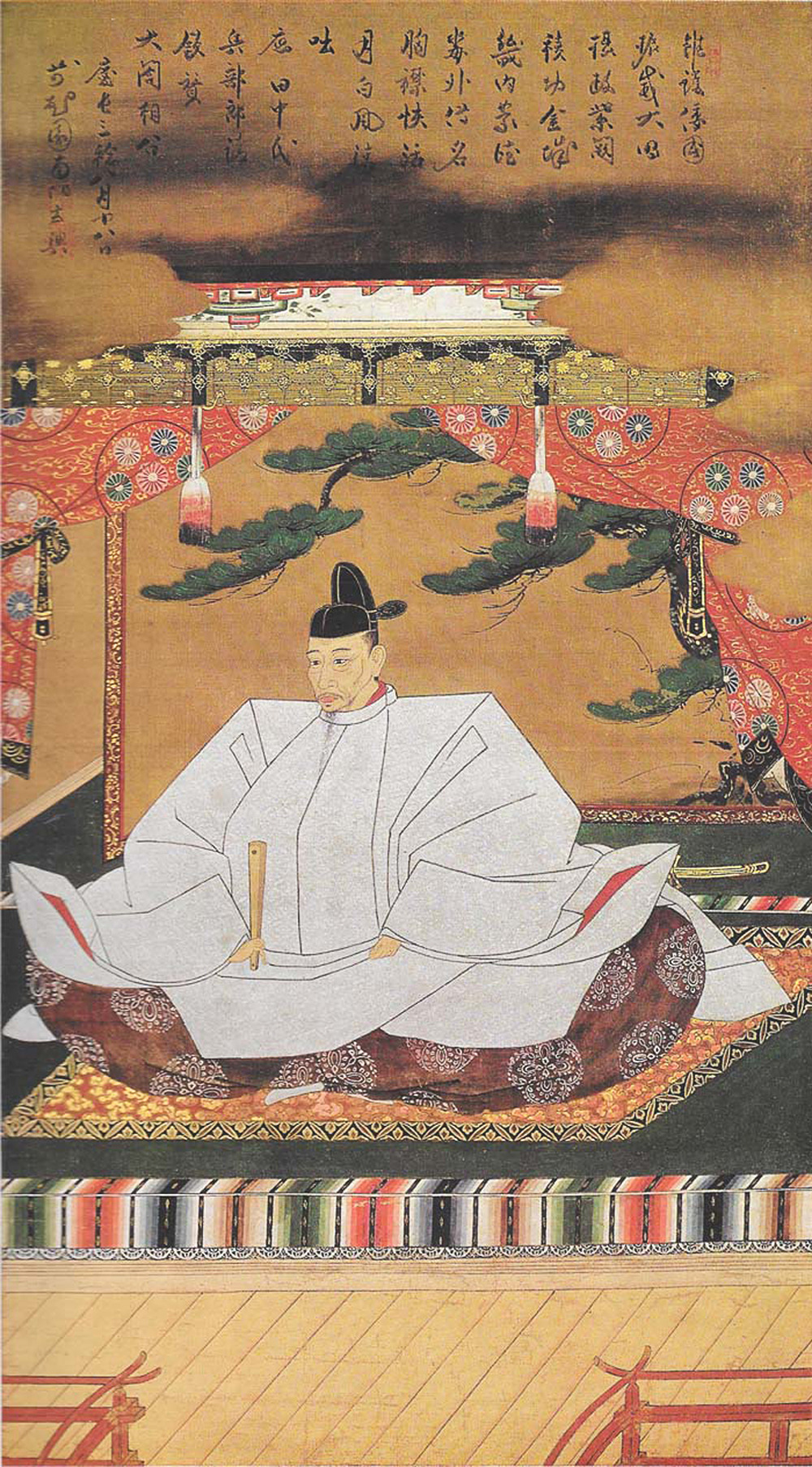
Portrait of Toyotomi Hideyoshi, by Kanō Mitsunobu

While a master of the fundamental Kanō school style, and that of his father, Mitsunobu expressed elements of his own preferences and skills in his paintings. The emergence of his own style was not truly observed until after his father's death in 1590 and he had more independent commissions. His color paintings of flowers, trees and similar subjects made extensive use of gold-leaf as most Kanō paintings did, but also displayed a delicate, elegant, and gentle lightness.
