= Kanō Tan'yū =

Japanese artist (1602–1674)

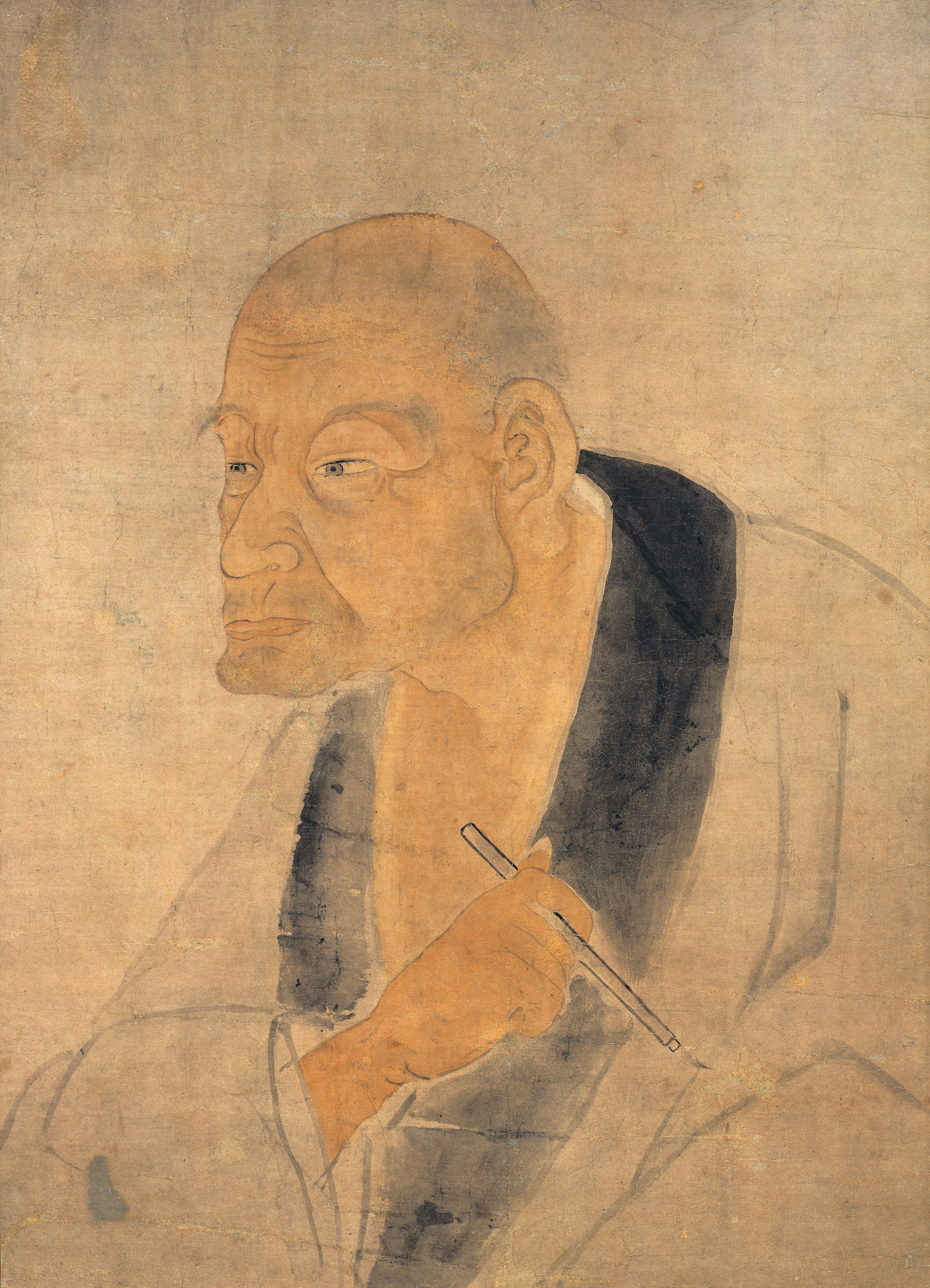
- Portrait of the artist, attributed to pupil Momoda Ryūei
- Born: 4 March 1602
- Died: 4 November 1674 (aged 72)
- Movement: Kanō school

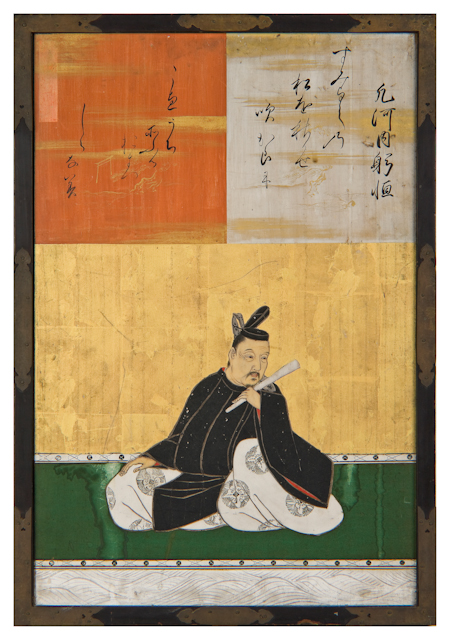
Sanjūrokkasen-gaku (Thirty-six Poetry Immortals framed picture) #3: Ōshikōchi no Mitsune

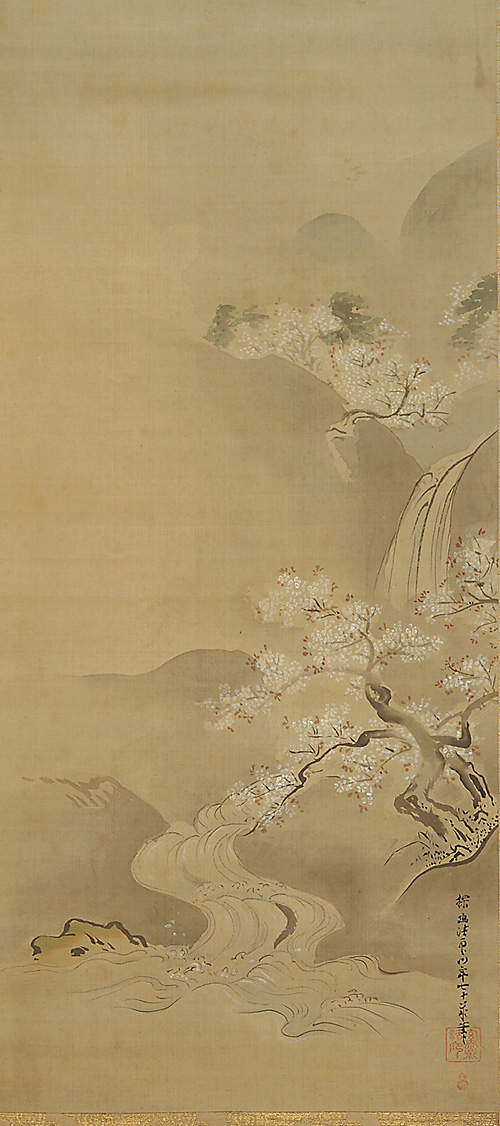
A 1672 work by Tan'yū, from the Freer Gallery of Art.

Kanō Tan'yū (Note: Japanese pronunciation: [kä̀.nó̞ó̞ (|) tä́ɰ̃̀.jɨ̀ɨ̀, -nó̞ó̞ | tä̀ɰ̃́.jɨ́ɨ́, -nó̞ó̞ (|) tä́ɰ̃́.jɨ́ɨ́]) (狩野 探幽; 4 March 1602 – 4 November 1674) was a Japanese painter of the Kanō school. One of the foremost Kanō painters of the Tokugawa period, many of the best known Kanō works today are by Tan'yū.

== Biography ==
His original given name was Morinobu; he was the eldest son of Kanō Takanobu and grandson of Kanō Eitoku.

In 1617, Tan'yū was appointed by the Tokugawa shogunate to become the shogunate's first official painter. Over the following years, he was given many highly prestigious commissions. Over the 1620s and 1630s, he created a number of large-scale works for Edo Castle, Nijō Castle, Osaka Castle, Nagoya Castle, and Nikkō Tōshō-gū.

Prolific in a variety of painting styles, Tan'yū's most famous works are probably those he produced for these large-scale commissions. They are screens and panels, prime examples of the Momoyama style, depicting natural subjects such as tigers, birds and plants, in bright colors and with extensive use of gold leaf. The gold, often used to represent clouds, water, or other background elements, would reflect what little light was available indoors, brightening a castle's dark rooms. Moreover his dignified portrayal of figures appear in Confucius and Two Disciples, a screen painting now in the Boston Museum of Fine Arts.

Tan'yū was also accomplished, however, in monochrome ink painting based on the prototypical style of the Muromachi period, yamato-e compositions in a style similar to that of the Tosa school, and Chinese style scrolls. His most famous yamato-e work is a narrative handscroll depicting the life of Tokugawa Ieyasu, the first Tokugawa shōgun and major figure in Japanese history. It was after this commission, in 1640, that the artist first took on the "artist name" of Tan'yū. His works decorated the walls of numerous palaces and castles, including Nijō Castle in Kyōto, the shogun’s castle at Nagoya, and the Kyōto Imperial Palace.

In addition to being a highly honored and respected painter in his own right, Tan'yū was known as a collector and connoisseur of Chinese paintings. He made sketches and kept records of many of the paintings that passed through his studio, brought to him for authentication.

He died in 1674 at the age of 72.

== See also ==
- Kusumi Morikage
